= Road signs in South America =

Road signs in the countries of South America such as Argentina and Brazil mostly follow road signs used in the United States, Canada and Mexico, and Central American countries. Signs are mostly based on the United States' Manual on Uniform Traffic Control Devices (MUTCD) issued by the Federal Highway Administration (FHWA), sharing many similarities in design to road signs used in the United States, Canada, Mexico and Central American countries.

Of the countries in South America, only Suriname and French Guiana, a French overseas territory, use European-style road signs based on the Vienna Convention on Road Signs and Signals, including triangular red-bordered warning signs as in mainland Europe. Brazil, Chile, Ecuador and Venezuela are the only four South American countries that have signed the Vienna Convention on Road Signs and Signals. Chile is also the only country in South America that has ratified this convention.

The vast majority of South American countries use yellow diamond-shaped warning signs as well as in the United States, Canada, Mexico and Central America. Recognizing the differences in standards across Europe and the Americas, the Vienna Convention considers these types of signs an acceptable alternative to the triangular warning sign. However, UN compliant signs must make use of more pictograms in contrast to more text based US variants. Indeed, most American nations make use of more symbols than allowed in the US MUTCD.

== Overview ==
=== Bolivia ===
Road signs in Bolivia are regulated by the Manuales Técnicos para el Diseño de Carreteras standard which is based on the United States' MUTCD (FHWA), Central America's Manuales Técnicos para el Diseño de Carreteras (SICA), Colombia's Manual de Señalización Vial (Ministry of Transport), and Chile's Manual de Carreteras. Thus, road signs used in Bolivia generally have many similarities to road signs used in the United States, Central America, Colombia and neighboring Chile.

=== Colombia ===
Traffic signs in Colombia are classified into three categories – warning, regulatory and information.

Warning signs are very similar to warning signs in United States. They are yellow diamond-shaped with a black symbol (the yellow colour is changed to an orange colour in areas under construction). In certain cases, the yellow colour is shifted to fluorescent yellow (in the school area sign and chevron sign).

Regulatory signs, both mandatory and prohibitory, are circular with a red border, a white background and a black symbol.

Information signs have many shapes and colours. Principally they are blue with white symbols and in many cases these signs have an information letter below the symbol.

=== Ecuador ===
Road signs in Ecuador are regulated in Manual Básico de Señalización Vial and the Ecuadorian technical standard RTE INEN 004-1:2011 Señalización vial. Signs are similar in design to those used in the United States.

Ecuador signed the Vienna Convention on Road Signs and Signals on November 8, 1968 but has yet to fully ratify it.

=== Guyana ===
Road signs in Guyana generally follow the same design as those used in the United States and are based on the MUTCD with the exception that some signs are reversed since the country drives on the left. However, most of current signs found in Guyana, are non-compliant with MUTCD standards. Metric speed limit signs in km/h are found in Guyana, while in the United States such signs with speed limits in km/h are extremely rare, usually seen near the borders with Canada and Mexico, both of which use the metric system.

=== Paraguay ===
Road signs in Paraguay are regulated in the Manual de Carreteras del Paraguay standard developed by the Ministry of Public Works and Communications.

=== Peru ===
Road signs in Peru are regulated by the Manual de Dispositivos de Control del Tránsito Automotor para Calles y Carreteras, developed by the Ministry of Transport and Communications of Peru. This standard is based on the United States' Manual on Uniform Traffic Control Devices (MUTCD) developed by the Federal Highway Administration, Colombia's Manual de Señalización Vial and Chile's Manual de Señalización de Tránsito. As a result, road signs in Peru are similar in design to those used in the United States on one side and in neighbouring Chile and Colombia on the other side.

=== Suriname ===
Road signs in Suriname are particularly modelled on the signage system used in the Netherlands since Suriname is a former Dutch colony. As Suriname drives on the left, unlike the Netherlands, certain signs are reversed to reflect this system.

=== Venezuela ===
Road signs in Venezuela are regulated in Manual Venezolano de Dispositivos Uniformes para el Control del Tránsito and are based on the United States' MUTCD.

== Table of traffic signs ==
=== Priority ===
	(Argentina)	(Aruba)	(Brazil)	(Bolivia)	(Chile)	(Colombia)	(Ecuador)	(French Guiana)	(Peru)	(Suriname)	(Venezuela)
	Argentina	Aruba	Brazil	Bolivia	Chile	Colombia	Ecuador	French Guiana	Peru	Suriname	Venezuela
Stop											
Give way											
Give way to oncoming traffic											
Priority over oncoming traffic											
Priority road											
Priority road ends											
	Argentina	Aruba	Brazil	Bolivia	Chile	Colombia	Ecuador	French Guiana	Peru	Suriname	Venezuela

=== Warning ===
	Argentina	Aruba	Brazil	Bolivia	Chile	Colombia	Ecuador	French Guiana	Peru	Suriname	Venezuela
Stop sign ahead											
Give way sign ahead											
Traffic signals											
Roundabout											
Two-way traffic ahead											
Divided highway ahead											
Divided highway ends											
Crossroads											
Staggered crossroads											
Steep ascent											
Steep descent											
Traffic queues											
	Argentina	Aruba	Brazil	Bolivia	Chile	Colombia	Ecuador	French Guiana	Peru	Suriname	Venezuela
Pedestrian crossing ahead											
Pedestrians											
Children											
Cyclists											
Domesticated animals											
Wild animals											
Road narrows											
Uneven surface											
Bump											
Dip											
	Argentina	Aruba	Brazil	Bolivia	Chile	Colombia	Ecuador	French Guiana	Peru	Suriname	Venezuela
Slippery surface											
Loose surface material											
Falling rocks											
Crosswinds											
Unprotected body of water											
Narrow bridge											
Opening bridge											
Tunnel											
Low-flying aircraft											
Trams											
	Argentina	Aruba	Brazil	Bolivia	Chile	Colombia	Ecuador	French Guiana	Peru	Suriname	Venezuela
Height limit ahead											
Width limit ahead											
Length limit ahead											
Weight limit ahead											
Level crossing with barriers ahead											
Level crossing without barriers ahead											
Level crossing (single track)											
Level crossing (multiple tracks)											
Roadworks											
Other danger											
	Argentina	Aruba	Brazil	Bolivia	Chile	Colombia	Ecuador	French Guiana	Peru	Suriname	Venezuela

=== Prohibitory ===
	Argentina	Aruba	Brazil	Bolivia	Chile	Colombia	Ecuador	French Guiana	Peru	Suriname	Venezuela
No entry											
Road closed (Note: Temporary use only.)	Not used		Not used	Not used	Not used				Not used		Not used
No motor vehicles	Not used						Not used				
No pedal cycles											
Maximum speed limit											
Minimum speed limit		Not used	Not used (Note: By law the Minimum Speed for a given road is half of Maximum Speed set for the same road)				Not used			Not used	
No pedestrians											
	Argentina	Aruba	Brazil	Bolivia	Chile	Colombia	Ecuador	French Guiana	Peru	Suriname	Venezuela

== See also ==
- Glossary of road transport terms
- Manual on Uniform Traffic Control Devices
- Traffic sign
- Vienna Convention on Road Signs and Signals
