= Road signs in Ecuador =

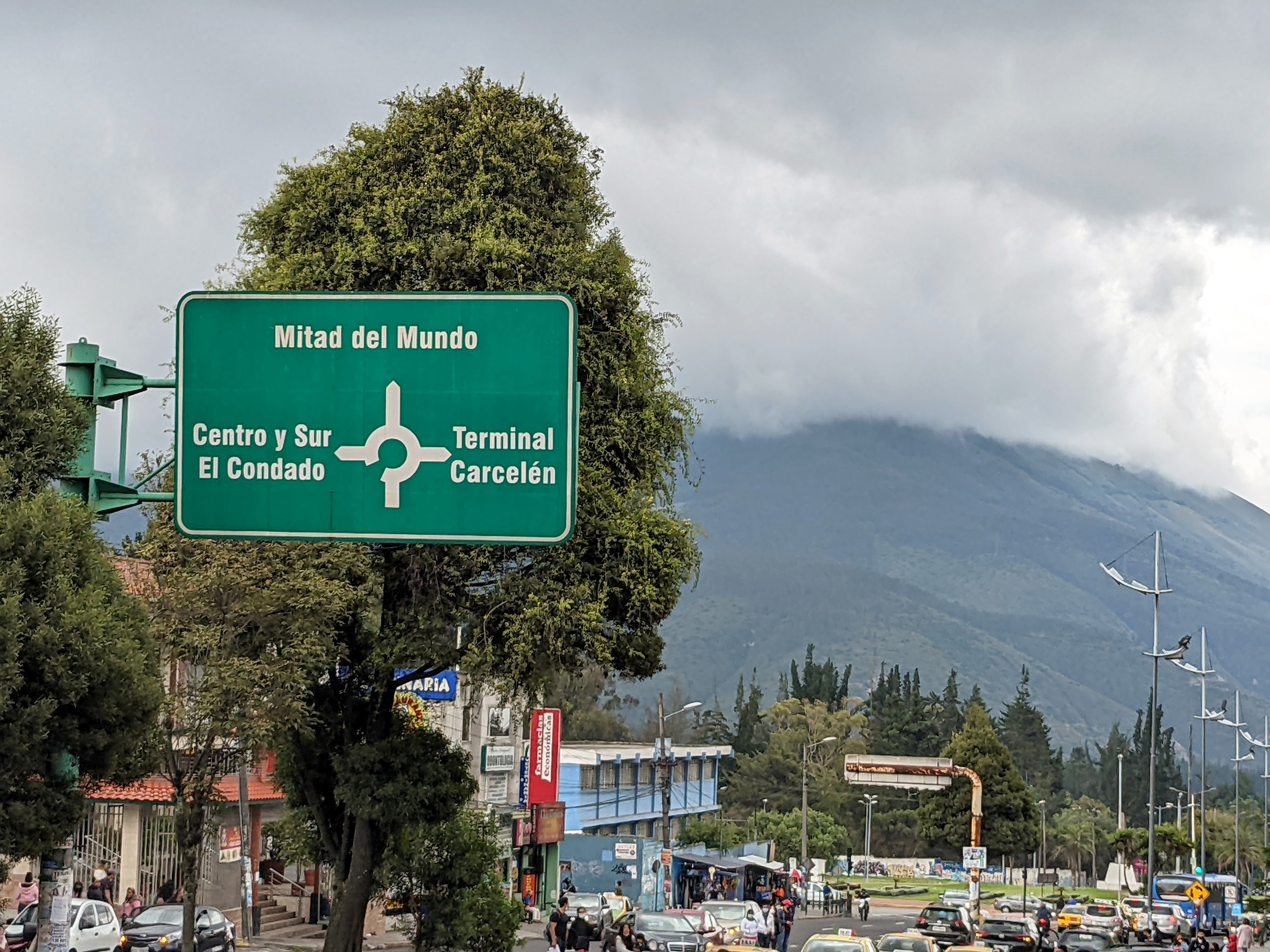
Street sign in Quito, Ecuador, pointing the way to the middle of the world

Road signs in Ecuador are regulated in Manual Básico de Señalización Vial and Reglamento Técnico Ecuatoriano. RTE INEN 004-1:2011. Señalización vial, which is based on the United States' Manual on Uniform Traffic Control Devices (MUTCD) originally developed by the Federal Highway Administration (FHWA). Thus, road signs in Ecuador are similar in design to road signs used in the United States, as well as those in Australia and New Zealand. One of the differences from the MUTCD is that Ecuador uses the metric system, for example, vehicle speed is measured in km/h.

Ecuador uses diamond-shaped warning signs on a yellow background in common with most of the rest of the Americas. One of the rare exceptions is the "Tramway crossing" warning sign used in the Cuenca Tramway, which has a triangular shape with a red border and a white background with a black symbol of a tram, similar to warning signs used in Europe. The regulatory and prohibitory signs are all of them rectangular, with the exception of the stop and the yield sign. Like Australia and the United States, the mandatory sign group is not used in Ecuador.

Ecuador signed the Vienna Convention on Road Signs and Signals on November 8, 1968 but has yet to fully ratify it.

The suffix D means "right", from Spanish derecha, while the suffix I means "left", from Spanish izquierda.

== Regulatory signs ==
Regulatory signs inform road users of the priorities in their use, as well as the existing prohibitions, restrictions, obligations and authorizations, the failure of which constitutes a traffic violation.

Most regulatory signs are rectangular in shape with the major axis vertical and have a border, legend and/or black symbols on a white background. Where possible, symbols and arrows are used to aid identification and clarify instructions.

Regulatory signs should generally be located on the right side of the road, but may be located on the left side or on both sides, to minimize the driver's perception and reaction time.

=== R1: Priority series ===
Priority signs are installed at the entrances to an intersection or at specific points where it is required to apply the regulations contained in these signs.

R1-1
Stop

R1-2
Give way

R1-3
Customs checkpoint

R1-4
Stop here on red light

=== R2: Direction series ===
Direction signs obligate drivers to circulate only in the direction indicated by the arrows on the signs.

R2-1I
One-way traffic to the left

R2-1D
One-way traffic to the right

R2-2
Two-way traffic

R2-3
Two-way traffic ahead

R2-4
Give way to pedestrians

R2-5I
Keep left

R2-5D
Keep right

R2-6I
Keep left

R2-6D
Keep right

R2-7
No entry

R2-8
No U-turn

R2-9I
No left turn

R2-9D
No right turn

R2-10
No left or U-turn

R2-11
Right turn on red light permitted

R2-12I
No changing lanes to the left

R2-12D
No changing lanes to the right

R2-13
No overtaking

R2-14a
Keep right

R2-14b
Buses keep right

R2-14c
Heavy vehicles keep right

R2-14d
Cycles keep right

R2-14e
Motorcycles keep right

R2-15I
Turn left only

R2-15D
Turn right only

R2-16
Go straight only

R2-17
One way bifurcation

R2-18I
Optional left lane movement

R2-18D
Optional right lane movement

R2-19a
Advance lane control at intersection

R2-19b
Advance lane control at intersection

R2-19c
Advance lane control at intersection

R2-20
Divided highway

R2-20a
Divided highway

=== R3: Movement restriction series ===
Movement restriction signs are used to prohibit the entry and/or circulation of the type of vehicle indicated in the symbol. It prohibits the continuation of the direct movement of the approaching vehicular or pedestrian flow, beyond the place where it is installed. It should be located where the driver or pedestrian can easily understand which road is prohibited from entering.

R3-1
No motor vehicles

R3-2
No trucks

R3-3
No buses

R3-4
No tractors

R3-5
No blocking intersection

R3-6
No cycles

R3-7
No motorcycles

R3-8
No human-powered vehicles

R3-9
No animal-drawn vehicles

R3-10
No pedestrians

R3-11
Buses only

R3-12a
Bikeway

R3-12b
Shared pedestrian and cycle path

R3-12c
End of shared pedestrian and cycle path

R3-12d
Segregated pedestrian and cycle path

R3-12e
End of segregated pedestrian and cycle path

R3-13
High-occupancy vehicle lane

R3-13a
End of high-occupancy vehicle lane

=== R4: Maximum limit series ===
R4-1
Speed limit (30 km/h)

R4-2
LED lighting speed limit

R4-3
End of speed limit

R4-4
Reduce speed

R4-5
Height limit

R4-6
Width limit

R4-7
Weight limit

R4-8
Axle weight limit

R4-9
Vehicle length limit

R4-10
Weight control

=== R5: Parking series ===
R5-1
Parking prohibited

R5-2
Parking and stopping prohibited

R5-3
Parking permitted

R5-4
Toll parking area

R5-5a
Reserved parking for people with disabilities

R5-5b
Reserved parking for people with disabilities

R5-6
Bus stop

=== R6: Complementary plate series ===
R6-1a
Parking restriction to the right

R6-1b
Parking restriction to the left

R6-1c
Parking restriction to the left and right

R6-2d
Loading zone

R6-3
The tow truck is working

R6-4
Next km/h

R6-5
Bus rapid transit

R6-6
Give way to the trolley

=== R7: Miscellaneous series ===
R7-1
No honking

R7-2
Do not pick up or drop off passengers

R7-3a
Pedestrian crossing

R7-3b
Pedestrian crossing

R7-4I
Pedestrian crossing tunnel on the left

R7-4D
Pedestrian crossing tunnel on the right

R7-5
Seat belt

== Warning signs ==
Warning signs are used to alert drivers of potential dangers ahead. They indicate the need to take special precautions and require a reduction in traffic speed or some other maneuver. On urban roads they are installed at a minimum distance of 100 m before the danger and 150 m on rural roads (highways).

A warning sign should generally be placed on the right side of the roadway and arranged to convey its message in the most efficient manner, without lateral obstruction or restricted sight distance. However, in special circumstances, the sign or a duplicate may be placed on the left side of the roadway.

=== P1: Curve series ===
Curve signs are installed on approaches to horizontal curves. Selection depends on approach speeds and track geometry. If the curves are substandard, these signs must be complemented with the recommended R4-1 speed signs.

P1-1I
Curve to the left at 90 degrees and less

P1-1D
Curve to the right at 90 degrees and less

P1-2I
Open curve to the left

P1-2D
Open curve to the right

P1-3I
Multiple curves at 90 degrees and less, first to the left

P1-3D
Multiple curves at 90 degrees and less, first to the right

P1-4I
Multiple open curves, first to the left

P1-4D
Multiple open curves, first to the right

P1-5I
Series of sharp bends ahead, first to the left

P1-5D
Series of sharp bends ahead, first to the right

P1-6I
Hairpin curve to the left

P1-6D
Hairpin curve to the right

P1-7I
Loop curve to the left

P1-7D
Loop curve to the right

=== P2: Intersections and junctions series ===
Intersection and junction signs are used where the sight distance at the approach to an intersection or junction is less than the safe stopping distance, or where drivers may have difficulty appreciating the presence or configuration of an intersection located later. They are generally located on rural roads and on urban roads located in less urbanized areas.

P2-1
Crossroads ahead

P2-2
T-junction ahead

P2-3
T-intersection with a dual carriage way ahead

P2-4I
T-intersection with a curve (left)

P2-4D
T-intersection with a curve (left)

P2-5I
Side road left

P2-5D
Side road right

P2-6I
Offset side roads (left)

P2-6D
Offset side roads (right)

P2-7
Y-junction ahead

P2-8I
Merging traffic from the left ahead

P2-8D
Merging traffic from the right ahead

P2-9I
Intersection in curve (left)

P2-9D
Intersection in curve (right)

P2-10I
Curve with external side road (left)

P2-10D
Curve with external side road (right)

P2-11I
Curve with internal side road (left)

P2-11D
Curve with internal side road (right)

P2-12I
Curve with side roads (left)

P2-12D
Curve with side roads (right)

P2-13I
Curve with side roads (left)

P2-13D
Curve with side roads (right)

P2-14I
Intersection in curve (left)

P2-14D
Intersection in curve (right)

P2-15I
Skewed side road on the left ahead

P2-15D
Skewed side road on the right ahead

P2-16I
Added lane on the left

P2-16D
Added lane on the right

P2-17
Roundabout ahead

P2-18
Railway crossing ahead

P2-18a
Railway line number

P2-19a
Railroad crossing without gates

P2-19b
Railroad crossing without gates

P2-19c
Railroad crossing and intersection 90° (left)

P2-19d
Railroad crossing and intersection 90° (right)

P2-19e
Railroad crossing and T-junction 90° (left)

P2-19f
Railroad crossing and T-junction 90° (right)

P2-19g
Angled railroad crossing (left)

P2-19h
Angled railroad crossing (right)

P2-19i
Angled railroad crossing (left)

P2-19j
Angled railroad crossing (right)

P2-20
Railway line crossing with barrier and traffic lights

=== P3: Traffic control device approach series ===
P3-1
Stop sign ahead

P3-2
Give way sign ahead

P3-3
Traffic lights ahead

P3-4
Pedestrian crossing ahead

=== P4: Widths, heights, lengths and weights series ===
Widths, heights, lengths and weights signs warn the drivers of the existence of future limitations on the width, height, length and weight of the roadway.

P4-1
Narrow bridge ahead

P4-2I
Road widens on the left

P4-2D
Road widens on the right

P4-3
Road widens on both sides

P4-4
Road narrows on both sides

P4-5I
Road narrows on the left

P4-5D
Road narrows on the right

P4-6
Dual carriageway begins

P4-7
Dual carriageway ends

P4-8
Maximum width

P4-9
Maximum height

P4-10
Maximum vehicle length

P4-11
Tunnel approach

P4-12
Maximum weight

=== P5: Lane assignment series ===
Lane assignment signs warn the driver of approaching an assignment of traffic lanes on the roads; Red symbols and lines are used in situations of greater danger. It is recommended to accompany it with a complementary signal according to the circumstances.

P5-1
Lane merge

P5-2
Two-way traffic

P5-3
Two traffic lanes in one direction and one opposite

P5-4
One traffic lane in one direction and two opposite

P5-5I
Left lane ends

P5-5D
Right lane ends

P5-6
Dead end street

=== P6: Obstacles and special situations series ===
Obstacles and special situations signs warn the driver of the existence of future limitations on the width, height, length and weight of the roadway.

P6-1
Diverge

P6-2
Speed bump

P6-3
Dip

P6-4
Uneven road

P6-5a
Downhill slope

P6-5b
Uphill slope

P6-6I
Rockfall (left)

P6-6D
Rockfall (right)

P6-7
Loose surface

P6-8
Slippery road

P6-9
Unprotected quay or river

P6-10
End of paved road

P6-11
Side winds

P6-12
Agricultural machinery

P6-13
Low-flying aircraft

P6-14
Cyclists on the road

P6-15I
Bicycle crossing sign on side street (left)

P6-15D
Bicycle crossing sign on side street (right)

P6-16
Road shared with cyclists

P6-17
Animals on the road

P6-18
Horse-drawn vehicle

P6-19
Fire vehicle

=== P7: Pedestrian series ===
P7-1
Pedestrians ahead

P7-2
Children ahead

P7-3
Playing zone ahead

P7-4
Hospital

=== P8: Complementary signs ===
Complementary signs are to complement other signs with additional information through symbols and/or legends, they must be used according to the needs of the preventive messages to be implemented, they must be located under the preventive sign; except where otherwise indicated.

P8-1
Kilometers per hour

P8-2
Meters

P8-3
Kilometers

P8-4
Next meters

P8-5
Next kilometers

P8-6
When raining

P8-7
Parking

P8-8
Blind people

== Information signs ==
Information signs are used to orient and guide road drivers, providing them with the necessary information so that they can reach their destinations in the safest, simplest and most direct way as possible.

I1-1a
Distance

I1-1b
Destination

I1-1c
Destination

I1-1d
Distance

I1-3ba
Names of streets and avenues (vehicular road sign)

I1-4C
Ramp speed limit

I1-4d
Exit speed limit

I1-4g
Toll prices

I1-4h1
Countdown marker (300 m)

I1-4h2
Countdown marker (200 m)

I1-4h3
Countdown marker (100 m)

I2-5
Parking zone

I2-5
Parking zone with distance (500 m)

I2-6I
Parking zone on the left

I2-6D
Parking zone on the right

I2-7a
Gas station with distance

I2-7b
Toll service sign with distance

I2-8a
Rest area/hotel to the right

I3-1
Traffic enforcement camera control zone

I3-3
Control of weights and dimensions

Kilometer sign

Kilometer sign

IT1-1
Aquarium

== Temporary signs ==
Temporary signs and/or devices for road works and special purposes warn road users of temporary hazardous conditions, which may affect users, workers and warn road users of temporary hazardous conditions, which may affect users, workers and equipment used in equipment used in the works.

T1-1
Roadworks ahead

T1-2
Traffic control flagger ahead

T1-3
Construction vehicle on the road

T1-4a
Roadworks ahead

T1-5a
Bridgework ahead

T1-4b
Roadworks ahead (plaque)

T1-5b
Bridgework ahead (plaque)

T1-6
Next XX km roadworks

T2-1a
Road closed

T2-1b
Road closed (plaque)

T2-2I
Left lane closed

T2-2D
Right lane closed

T2-3a
Lane closed (right)

T2-3b
Lane closed (left)

T2-3c
Lane closed (center)

T3-1a
Detour XX m

T3-1b
Detour XX m (plaque)

T3-2a
Detour ends

T3-2b
Detour ends (plaque)

T3-3aI
Detour to the left

T3-3aD
Detour to the right

T3-3bI
Detour to the left

T3-3bD
Detour to the right

T4-1
Fresh asphalt

T4-2
Gravel road

T4-3
Water on the road

T5-1
Roadwork ends (plaque)

T5-2
Roadwork ends

== School zone signs ==
School zone signs warn and inform road users of the approach to an educational center and the priorities in the use of the same, as well as the existing prohibitions, restrictions, obligations and authorizations, the non-compliance of which is considered a violation of traffic laws and regulations.

The school zone is defined as the radius of influence of a given educational center, which is a minimum of 200 metres (0.12 mi). This radius of influence must be increased according to the road geometry, the sector where the educational center is located, its capacity and the educational level it serves, which may be classified as preschool, school, middle school, etc.

E1-1
School zone ahead

E2-1
Hours

E2-2
When the children are present

E2-3
Days of the week

E2-4
Flashing lights

E2-5
School zone

E2-6
Precaution

ER1-1
School zone speed limit (30 km/h)

ER1-2
School zone speed limit with flashing lights (30 km/h)

ER2-5
Bus stop in school zone

ER3-1
End of school zone
