= Ronald Shakespear =

Argentine graphic designer

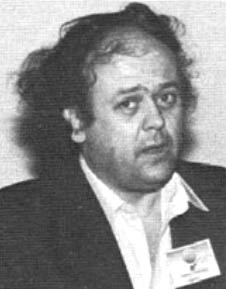
- Shakespear in 1987
- Born: 1941 (age 84–85); Rosario
- Notable work: Buenos Aires Visual Plan

Ronald Shakespear (born 1941 in Rosario, Santa Fe) is an Argentine graphic designer, mostly known for the Buenos Aires Visual Plan, designed along Guillermo González Ruiz in 1971–72. and other visual identity systems for several companies.

He was in charge of his own studio, "Diseño Shakespear" until his retirement in 2021.

== Early life ==
He was born in Rosario, Santa Fe. He married Elena Peyron. They have three daughters, Bárbara, María and Sofía, and two sons, Lorenzo and Juan. Shakespear is Chair Professor at the University of Buenos Aires and past president of the Association of Graphic Designers of Buenos Aires (Asociación de Diseñadores Gráficos de Buenos Aires).

He operated a multidisciplinary design consultancy, Diseño Shakespear, currently run by his sons. The studio specializes in corporate identity programs, corporate architecture, wayfinding systems, urban furniture design, web and literature design and communications strategy.

== Career ==
Shakespear has given seminars, lectures and workshops in 32 cities, including New York, Hollywood, Buenos Aires, Brasilia, Santiago, Austin, Edmonton, Toronto, Córdoba, Rosario, Vancouver and Richmond.

He has been guest speaker in Icograda International Congresses at Nice, Montreal, São Paulo and Beijing.

=== Diseño Shakespear ===
Diseño Shakespear is a design firm specialising in the planning and design of signage, wayfinding and identity programs for a wide variety of facility types. Diseño Shakespear designed Identity Programs for major Argentine companies such as Avex, Banco Galicia, Banco Patagonia, Luigi Bosca, Boca Juniors, Duty Free Shop, Red Link, Oca, Banelco and Harrods. He founded his studio in 1960.

Major Diseño Shakespear wayfinding and branding projects:

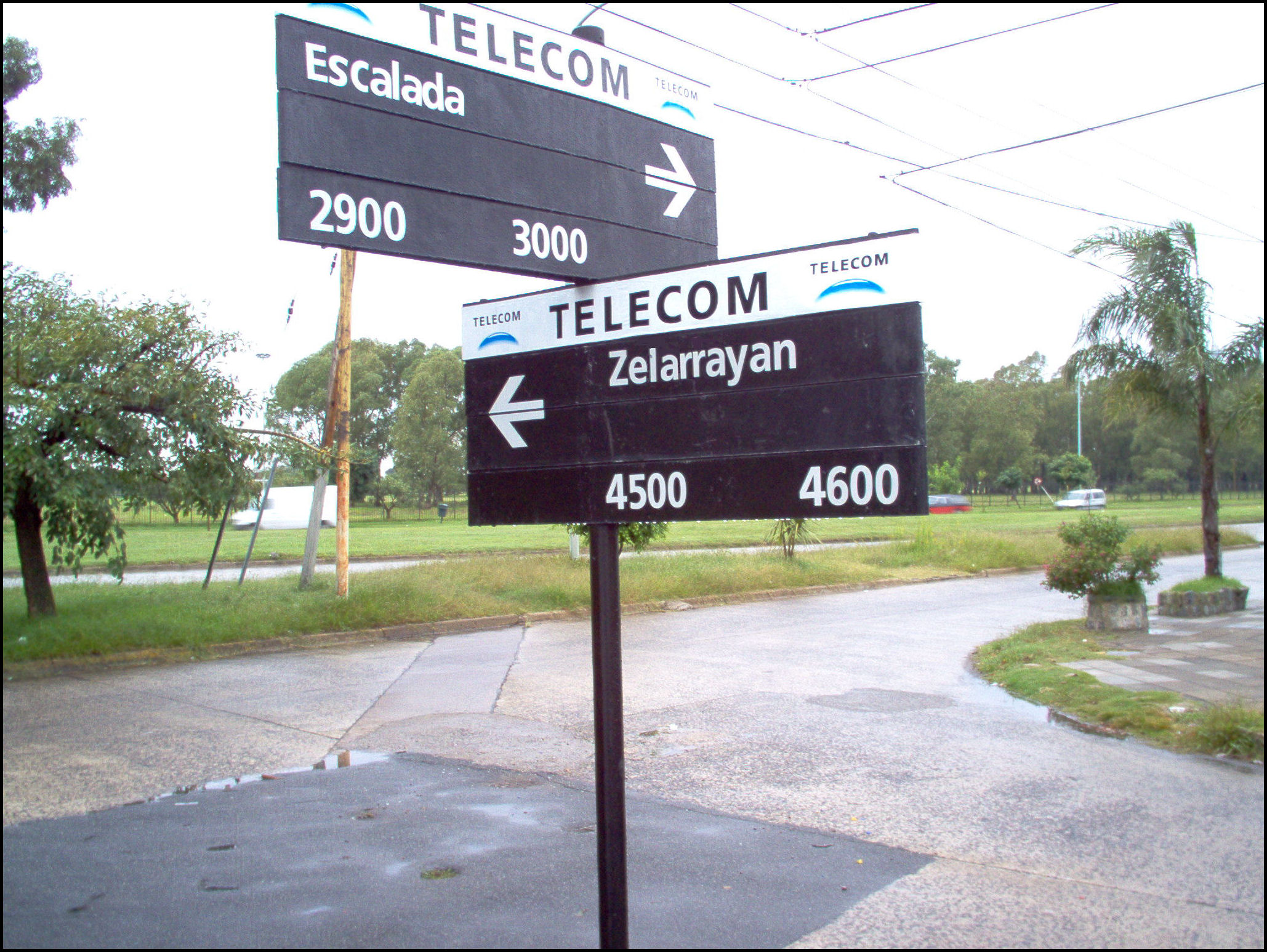
Street name signs (1972)

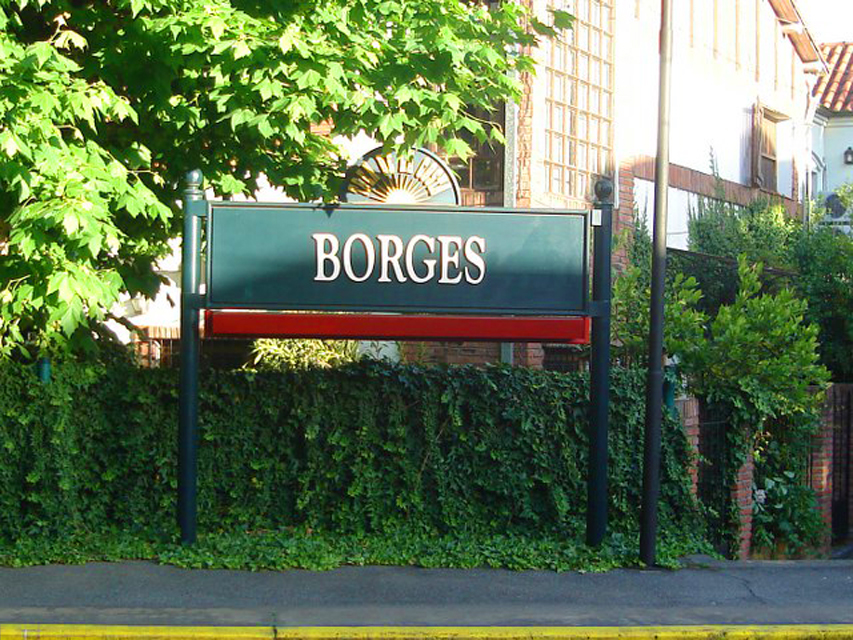
Tren de la Costa signage (1995)

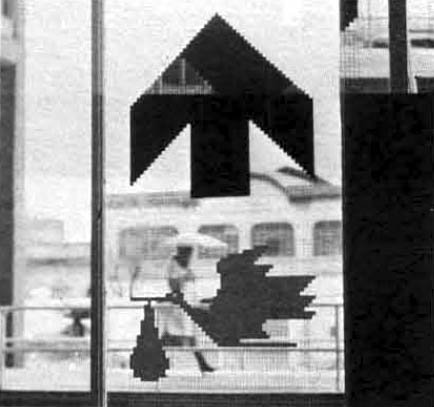
Signage for hospitals in Buenos Aires (1978)

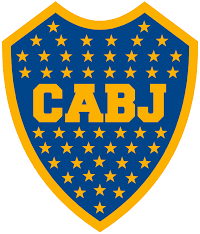
Boca Juniors visual identity (1996)

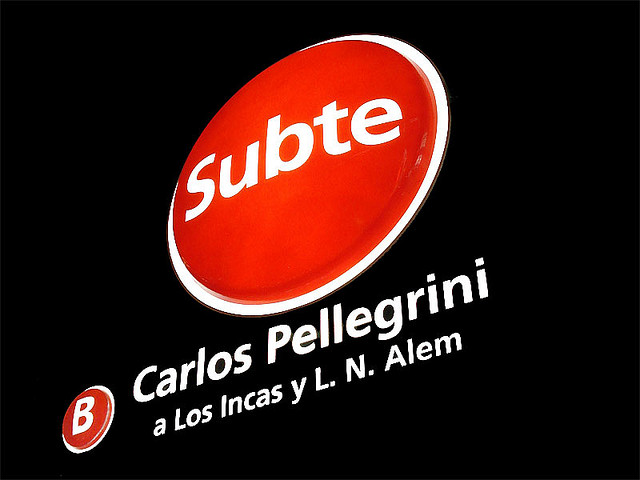
Buenos Aires Subte signage (1995)

- Buenos Aires Visual Plan (1971–72) (with Guillermo Gonzalez Ruiz)
- Hospitals of Buenos Aires signage (1978) (with Raúl Shakespear)
- Buenos Aires Underground signage and branding (1995–2008)
- Tren de la Costa visual identity and signage (1995)
- Boca Juniors branding (1996)
- Temaikèn Zoo visual identity (1999–2002)
- Banelco
- Alto Palermo
- Harrod's
- Dot Baires Shopping

Their projects have appeared in many design publications, including:

- United States: Graphis and Segd DESIGN, Sign Graphics
- Italy: Domus, Interni, Abitare, Top Symbols
- Japan: Idea and Graphic Design
- Germany: Novum
- Switzerland: Graphis and Who's Who
- United Kingdom: Eye Magazine, Information Graphics
- Spain: Experimenta
- Chile: Nuevo Diseño
- Argentina: 90+10
- China: Package & Design
- Taschen's Latin America Design.

== Exhibitions ==
It exhibited at the Centre Georges Pompidou (Paris), and Triennale di Milano, ICCID, (Italy). Mayor exhibitions were held at Centro Recoleta and National Fine Arts Museum, (Buenos Aires).

The last exhibition in Buenos Aires on 45th Anniversary of Diseño Shakespear- took place at Centro Borges in 2005.

It appeared at the Anthological Exhibit and workshop at Virginia Center for Architecture, AIA, (Richmond) 2006, and at The Katzen Arts Center (Washington, D.C.), 2008.

== Recognition ==
- Silver Pencil Award (1987)
- Served on International Jury for the Art Directors Club of New York (1990)
- Konex Award Merit Diploma, Konex Foundation (1992)
- Milestone Recognition Award (2005)
- Golden Brain (2006)
- Wolda Awards (2008)
- SEGD Fellow Award - The Society for Environmental Graphic Design (2008)
- Aiga XCD (2009)
- Winner of many National and International Contests

== Publications ==
His book Diseño Shakespear was published in 1995. He published Grafopuntura, on Hospital Pictograms in 1996.

Diseño Shakespear 2 is published in Buenos Aires, Three documents of Urban Scenery (Underground Signage, Temaiken Zoo and Tren de la Costa) were published in 1999. His last book Señal de Diseño, Memory of a Practice, was re-published in 2009.

His photos, portraits and posters are in private collections in Canada, Switzerland and USA. Also in the Borges Foundation and MAMBA Museum in Buenos Aires.
