= Buenos Aires Visual Plan =

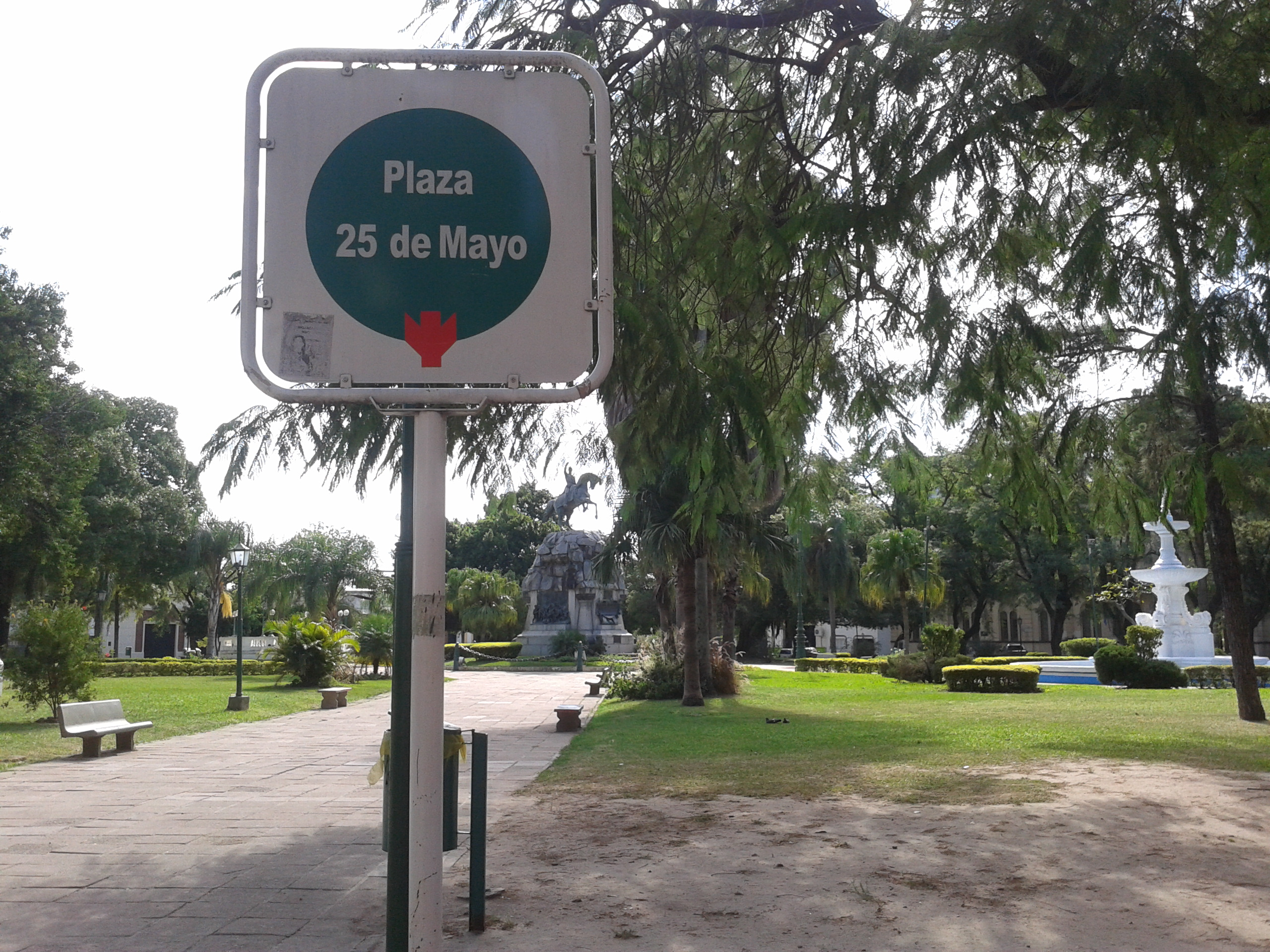
- Public park sign, one of the new symbols introduced in the Buenos Aires Visual Plan
- Native name: Plan Visual de Buenos Aires
- Date: 1971–72
- Location: Buenos Aires
- Theme: Design of a renovated system of road signs
- Motive: Obsolete and poorly communicative road signs system
- Participants: Government of Buenos Aires City; Shakespear–González Ruiz Studio

The Buenos Aires Visual Plan was the first program to establish an organised system of traffic signs in the city of Buenos Aires, developed and implemented between 1971 and 1972. The plan had been thought by the Buenos Aires administration led by then Intendent Saturnino Montero Ruiz and carried out by the design studio managed by architects Guilermo González Ruiz and Ronald Shakespear.

The program, officially named "Plan for the Design of a Visual Identification System" (Spanish: Plan para el Diseño de un Sistema de Identificación Visual), is regarded as an avant-garde graphic landmark in the Buenos Aires urban design,

The road signs were later replicated in other cities in Argentina and even in Latin America. The visual plan style has been used as model for future signal systems in Buenos Aires.

== Overview ==
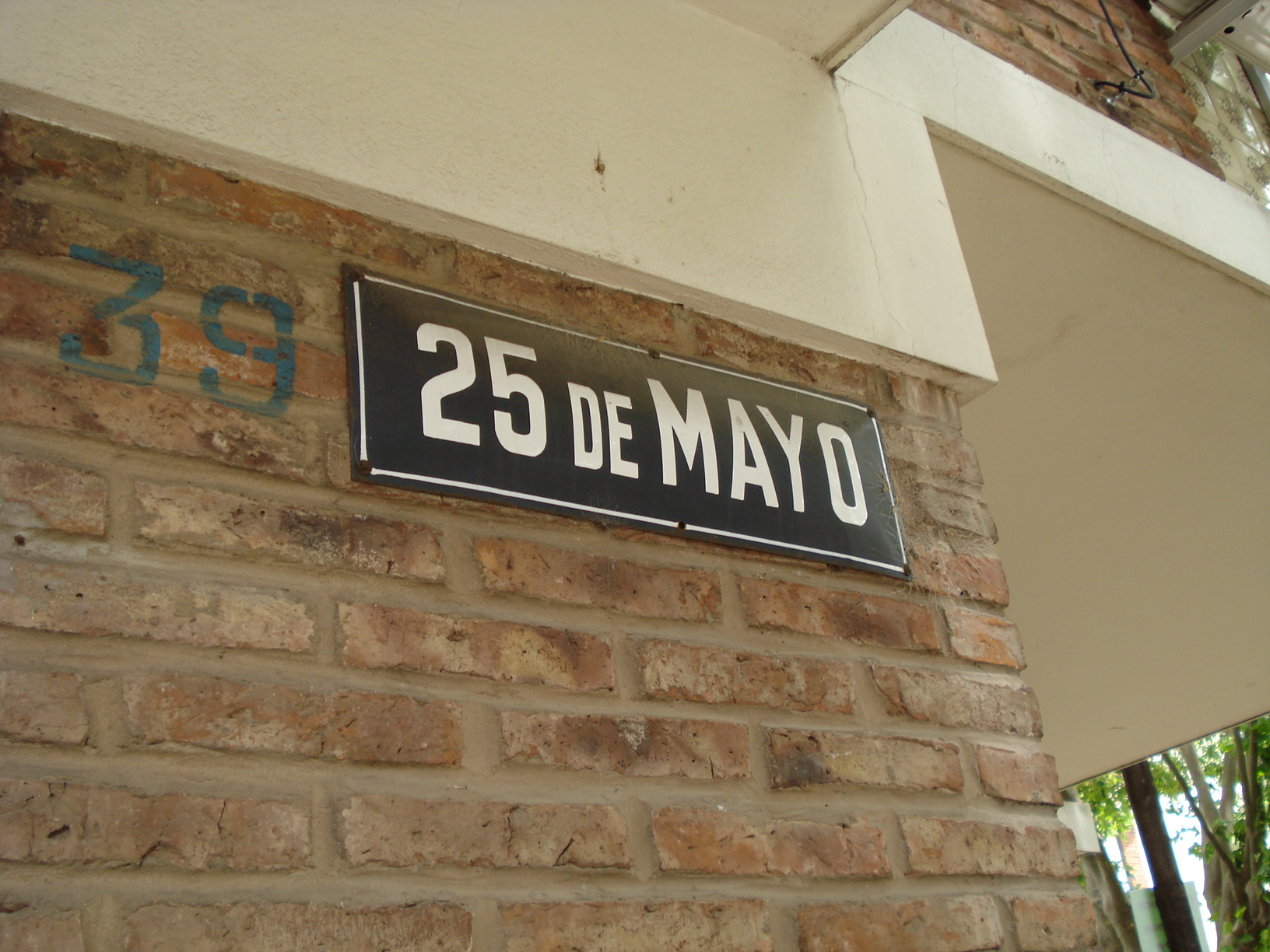
Street name sign as seen in Buenos Aires before the visual plan.

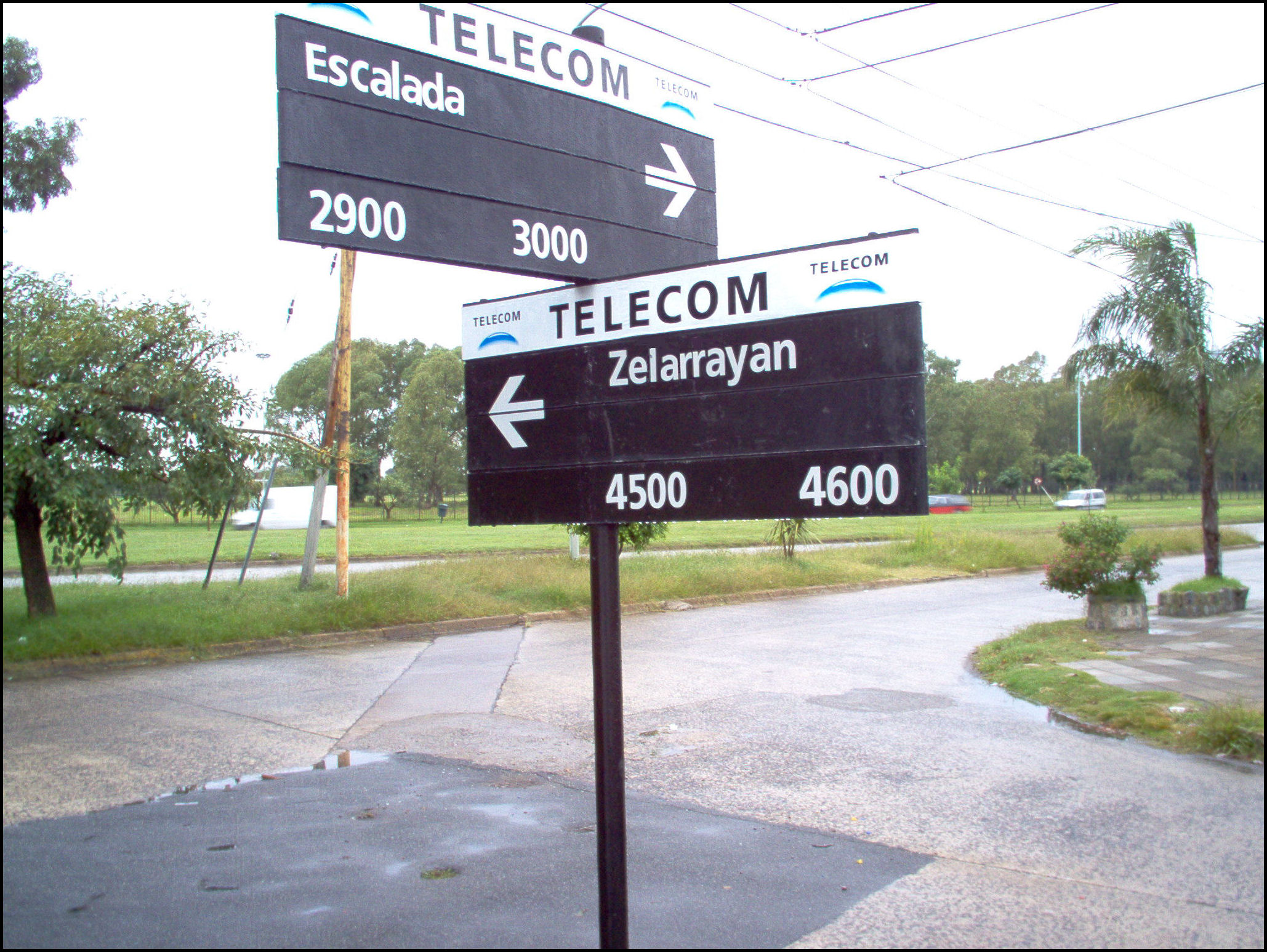
With the plan implemented, signs included street names and way. Nevertheless, later revisions of the signs included advertisement banners.

Ronald Shakespear has recognised the work of graphic designer and typographer Jock Kinneir as the main inspiration for the BA Visual Plan. Kinneir, along with his assistant Margaret Calvert, had been designed the road signs in the United Kingdom from 1957 to 1967. Kinneir's sign is considered one of the most ambitious information design projects ever undertaken in the UK, becoming a model for modern road signage in the world. Kinneir and Calvert's system was notable for the use of typography (that included the use of lowercase letters in the signs) and the coordinated use of shapes and chromatic scales to sort the information.

In Shakespear's own words:

Signs are designed to be read, they work through the eyes exclusively. If our eyes are too busy watching the road or the car dashboard, the graphic signs have to be very competitive so that they can be watched

It has even hardly recognised that the most important actor in any situation involving design, is the public

(Left): Logo for the Municipality of Buenos Aires, also used on signs back as a symbol of corporate identity;
(right): The taxi stop sign, featuring a hand, became iconic and one of the most recognisable pieces of the project

The main purpose of the visual plan was to establish an information system which "guided city inhabitants to their destinations without asking anything to anybody".

As part of the visual plan development, all the road and street name signs were redesigned. Before the plan, street name signs were fitted to walls, and then featured different typographies. The González Ruiz/Shakespear studio replaced them with signs located on street corners. Those signs consisted of posts with two plaques attached, each one indicating the street name and way. Those signs also introduced the use of the helvetica font in the urban signal system of Buenos Aires. The Helvetica would be also adopted as the corporate font by the Municipality of Buenos Aires. In more recent years, later revisions of the original signs included advertisement banners on the top of them, something that Shakespear himself complained about.

Although the visual plan is mostly known for its road and information signs, it was indeed a complete visual identity project for the city of Buenos Aires that include elements of corporate identity such as logo, colors, employees uniforms, among other elements.

Other informative elements that were part of the system were the bus stop (colectivos) signs, the hand designed for taxi stops, signs for parks and a simplified version of the coat of arms of Buenos Aires. The taxi stop signal was depicted as a hand (symbolising the way of "hail" a taxi), using the typical yellow and black colors of that vehicles. That signal was also replicated in other cities, nevertheless it was replaced by a simpler version in 2012, during the Mauricio Macri administration.

== See also ==
- Ronald Shakespear
- Road signs in Argentina
