= Road signs in Argentina =

In Argentina, road signs are similar to those of other South American countries. They are something of a compromise between the Vienna Convention signs used in Europe and the U.S. system. Argentina is right-hand traffic.

While warning signs are mostly based on the US's MUTCD (yellow diamond shape), information, mandatory and prohibitory signs were taken from the Vienna Convention diagrams.

In 1994, the Congress of Argentina promulgated Law n° 24.449 with the purpose of establishing a single rules system within the whole country. The diagrams of those road signs were published in the "Anex L" of Decree 779 (promulgated in 1995), which ruled Law 24.449 and added visual information to its article 22.

Starting in 2013, the National Directorate of Roads of Argentina (DNV) published a series of visual identity guides that detailed specific norms for the installation and use of road signs along the country, including fonts, colors, materials, and measures, among other items. Those manuals also included an update (released in 2017) to some road signs.

== History ==
The first road signs in Argentina can be traced to 1817 in Buenos Aires Province, when Juan Martín de Pueyrredón (then Supreme Director of the United Provinces of the Río de la Plata) promulgated a Decree to create a Road Committee. This committee was commissioned to place posts on the main roads to serve as reference and guide for pedestrians. Those posts indicated leagues travelled and destinations.

In 1855, another provincial decree provided for new signs consisting of kilometre markers, which also indicated the name (or number) of the road. Both decree established the basements of an organised sign system not only in Buenos Aires but in the whole country. In 1885, engineer Jorge Coquet designed a sign system which is considered the first organised system in the country. The system was a complete program that include measurements, heights, types of plaques, among other specifications. Those signs were popularly known as "Coquet signs".

After that, the Argentine Automobile Club ("Automóvil Club Argentino"), the largest automobile association of Argentina, started to design an own system of signs (made of iron) and placing them on the main roads in the country.

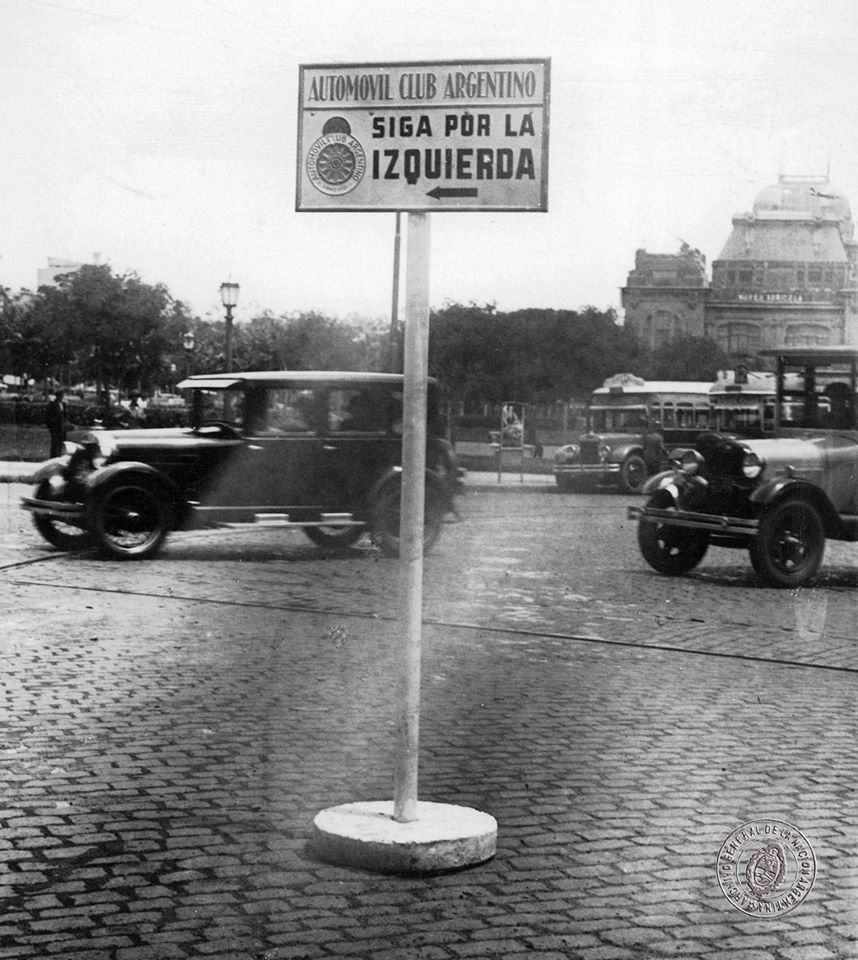
Road sign at Plaza Italia, Buenos Aires, 1931. The Argentine Automobile Club manufactured signs through several agreements with national and provincial road administrations

In 1932, the "Dirección Nacional de Vialidad" (the Argentine national office in charge of the development, planning and conservation of national routes, abbreviated DNV) was created through law 11,658. It established that all the provinces of Argentina should adopt a unique sign system (similar to the US road signs). Nevertheless, in May 1935 the Congress of Argentina promulgated Law 12,153 which ruled that Argentina subscribed to road signs approved by the 1926 International Convention relating to Road Traffic held in Paris. In article 9, Law specified that road signs should be equilateral triangle-shaped, following the procedures of the Paris convention but unlike signs used in Argentina (in form of diamond).

To reach a consensus and solve the problem, in 1939 the DNV created a committee to make variations to the existing sign system. After studying the case, the committee established a code that incorporated both systems, Paris convention's and US signs. It finally came into force in December 1939 and has remained (with minor variations) since then.

The DNV published its first manual of road signs in 1928 (under the name "Señales Camineras") with later editions in 1954, 1963, 1971 and 2017. The FHWA Series typeface was adopted as the main font by the DNV in 1971.

In 1941, the DVBA ("Dirección de Vialidad de Buenos Aires", the provincial road administration) signed the first agreement with the Argentine Automobile Club (ACA), which stated that the ACA would built and place about 5,000 road signs on the main routes of Buenos Aires. Other agreements were later signed between both institutions, in 1955 and 1959, that added 6,000 signs to the routes. The total amount for the 11,000 signs was m$n 2,352,000. The ACA also signed agreements with other provincial administrations, such as San Juan (in 1942), Santa Fe (1945), Entre Ríos (1945), and San Luis (1947).

The Buenos Aires Visual Plan established in 1971 in the city of Buenos Aires introduced minor variations on some existing warning and regulatory signs, a part of redesigning street name signs completely. Those signs also introduced the use of the helvetica font in the urban signal system of Buenos Aires. That same year the ACA signed new agreements with the DNV, DVBA and other provincial offices (Santa Fe, Formosa) to build and place road signs. The total of signs were 20,000 for the DNV and 15,000 for the DVBA.

Argentine road signs were introduced in December 1994, with the promulgation of Law 24.449 by the Congress of Argentina, with the purpose of establishing a single rules system within the whole country. Annex "L" of art. 22 ("uniform sign system") included a list of updated road signs for all the Argentine territory.

== Gallery ==
=== Regulatory signs ===
No straight ahead

No entry

No cars

No motorbike

No bike

No trucks

No trailers

No pedestrians

No animal-drawn vehicles

No equestrians

No hand carts

No tractors

No left turn

No right turn

No U-turns

No passing

No honking

No parking

No stopping

No lane change

Weight limit

Axle weight limit

Height limit

Width limit

Length limit

Maximum speed limit (5 km/h)

Maximum speed limit (10 km/h)

Maximum speed limit (15 km/h)

Maximum speed limit (20 km/h)

Maximum speed limit (25 km/h)

Maximum speed limit (30 km/h)

Maximum speed limit (35 km/h)

Maximum speed limit (40 km/h)

Maximum speed limit (45 km/h)

Maximum speed limit (50 km/h)

Maximum speed limit (60 km/h)

Maximum speed limit (70 km/h)

Maximum speed limit (80 km/h)

Maximum speed limit (90 km/h)

Maximum speed limit (100 km/h)

Maximum speed limit (110 km/h)

Maximum speed limit (120 km/h)

Maximum speed limit (130 km/h)

Minimum speed limit (5 km/h)

Minimum speed limit (10 km/h)

Minimum speed limit (15 km/h)

Minimum speed limit (20 km/h)

Minimum speed limit (25 km/h)

Minimum speed limit (30 km/h)

Minimum speed limit (35 km/h)

Minimum speed limit (40 km/h)

Minimum speed limit (45 km/h)

Minimum speed limit (50 km/h)

Minimum speed limit (55 km/h)

Minimum speed limit (60 km/h)

Reserved parking

Bus lane

Motorbike lane

Bike lane

Bridle path

Pedestrians only

Snow chains allowed

Turn right mandatory

Turn left mandatory

One way to right

One way to left

One way to straight

Pass on right

Pass on left

Trucks must keep right

Pedestrians must keep left

Stop - control

Two-way traffic

Stop

Yield

Yield to oncoming traffic

End of passing prohibition

End of maximum speed limit (60 km/h)

=== Warning signs ===
Railway crossing ahead

Pedestrian crossing

Attention

Curve to right

Curve to left

Sharp turn to right

Sharp turn to left

Double curve, first to left

Double curve, first to right

Double sharp turn, first to left

Double sharp turn, first to right

Winding road, first to left

Winding road, first to right

Steep descent

Steep ascent

Road narrows

Road narrows on the right side

Road narrows on the left side

Dip

Bump

Slippery road

Loose stones

Falling rocks

Tunnel

Narrow bridge

Swing bridge

Height limit ahead

Width limit ahead

Start of dual carriageway

End of dual carriageway

Roundabout ahead

Merging traffic

Two-way traffic ahead

Crossroads

Side road to right

Y-junction

T-junction

School

Children

Cyclists

Horse riders

Cattle

Deer

Low-flying aircraft

Trams

Tractors

Ambulance station

Wind

Traffic lights

Stop sign ahead

Yield sign ahead

=== Informative signs ===
Motorway

End of motorway

Parking

Turn right permitted

Turn left permitted

Turn right

Turn left

Turn left and straight ahead

Turn right and straight ahead

Lane split

Turn left and right ahead

== See also ==
- Buenos Aires Visual Plan
