= Road signs in Brazil =

Road signs in Brazil is regulated by Código de Trânsito Brasileiro, the law about transportation in Brazil. Conselho Nacional de Trânsito (lit. 'Council of National Transportation'; abbr. Contran) is responsible to it.

Brazil signed the Vienna Convention on Road Signs and Signals on November 8, 1968, but has yet to fully ratify it.

== Warning signs ==
Sharp Curve to Left	Sharp Curve to Right	Bend to Left	Bend to Right	Winding road to left	Winding road to right	Reverse turn to left
Reverse turn to right	S-curve to Left	S-curve to Right	Crossroads	Side Road to Left	Side Road to Right	T-intension
Y-junction	Oblique road branch to left	Oblique road branch to right	Successive opposite intersections (left first)	Successive opposite intersections (right first)	Roundabout ahead	Merging traffic from left
Merging traffic from right	Traffic Signal Ahead	Stop ahead	Tram	Bumpy Roadway	Bump	Dip
Steep descent	Steep ascent	Road narrows on both sides	Road narrows to left	Road narrows to right	Road widens to left	Road widens to right
Narrow bridge	Movable Bridge	Roadwork	Two-way traffic ahead	One-way traffic flow to right	Two-way traffic flow	Rock fall
Slippery Road	Loose surface	Bike	Bicycle crossing	Traffic Supported by Cyclists and Pedestrians	Transit of Tractors or Agricultural Machinery	Pedestrian
Pedestrian crossing	School	School crossing	Playground	Cattle crossing	Deer crossing	Maximum height
Maximum width	Uncontrolled railroad crossing	Controlled railroad crossing	Railroad crossing	Railroad crossing	Divided highway start	Divided highway end
Pass on both sides	Low flying Aircraft	High winds	Dead end	Maximum weight	Maximum weight per axle	Maximum length

== Regulatory signs ==
Stop	Yield	No Entry	No Left Turn	No Right Turn	No U-turn to left	No U-turn to right
No Parking	Parking	No Stopping	No Overtaking	No lane changes to right	No lane changes to left	No trucks
No cars	Animal-drawn vehicles prohibited	No bicycles	Traffic of Tractors and Construction Machinery Prohibited	Maximum Total Gross Weight Allowed	Height limit	Maximum Allowed Width
Maximum Permitted Weight per Axle	Maximum Allowed Length	Speed Limit	No Horn or Sound Signal Prohibited	Customs	Mandatory Use of Tyre Chains	Cars keep right
One-way Street	Pass on the right	Turn left	Turn right	Proceed left or straight	Proceed right or straight	Proceed straight
Buses, Trucks and Large Vehicles Keep on the right	Two-way traffic	No pedestrians	Pedestrian Walk Left	Pedestrian Walk Right	Buses only	Roundabout
Bicycles only	Cyclist, Drive on the Left	Cyclist, Drive on the Right	Cyclist on the Left Pedestrians on the Right	Pedestrians on the Left Cyclist on the Right	Motorcycles, scooters and mopeds are prohibited.	No Bus
Trucks only	Handcarts Prohibited

== Educational signs ==
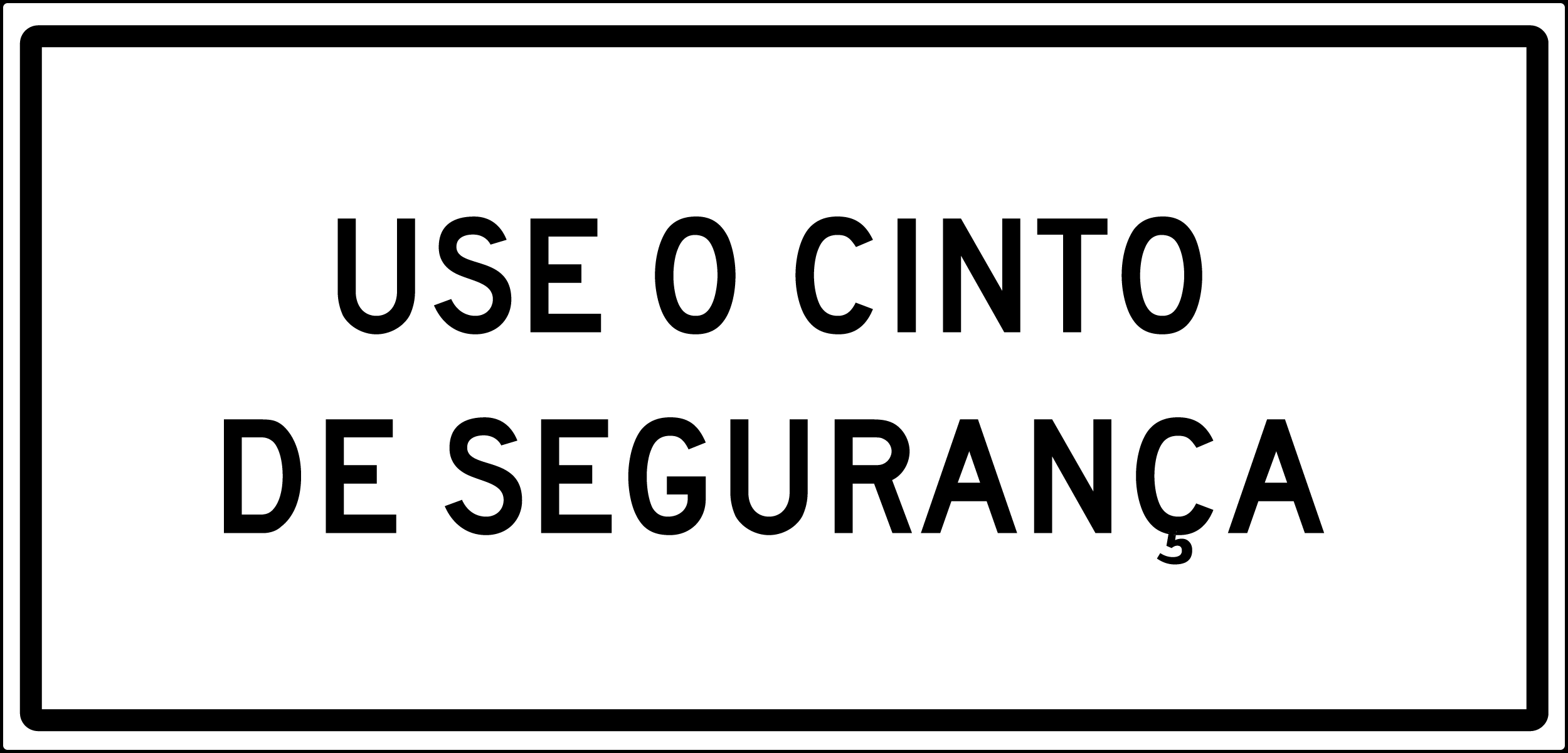
Wear your seatbelt

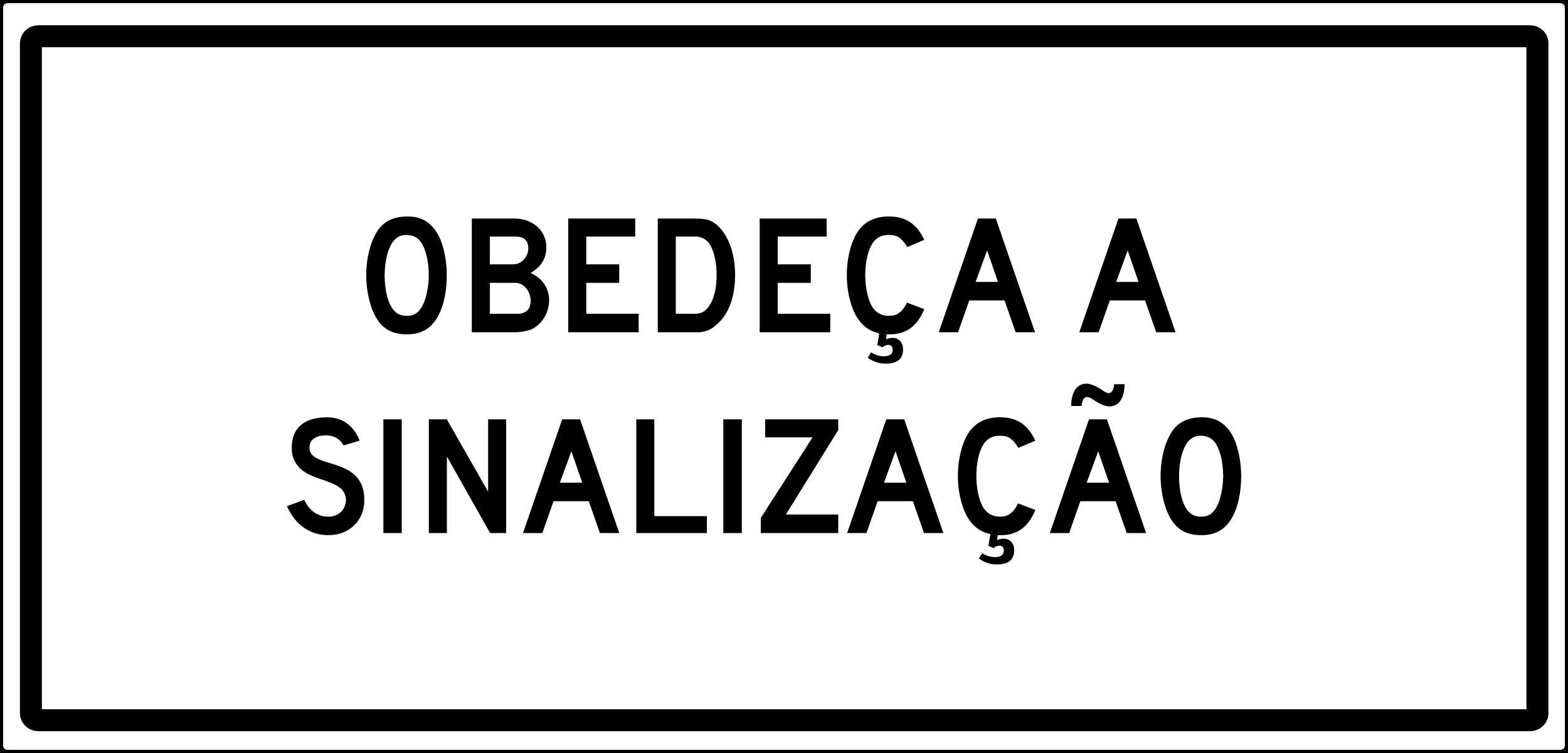
Obey posted signs

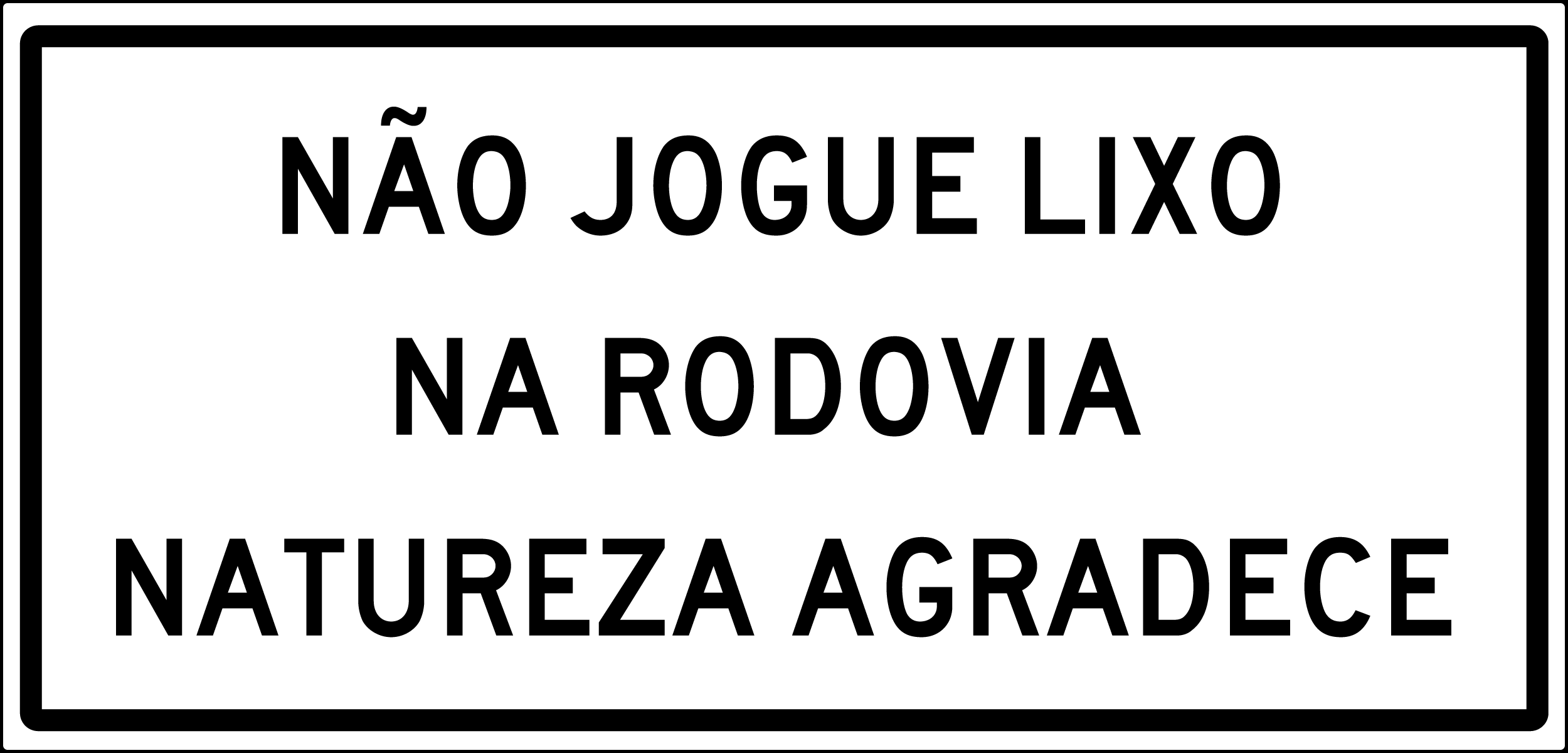
Don't throw trash on the highway nature thanks you

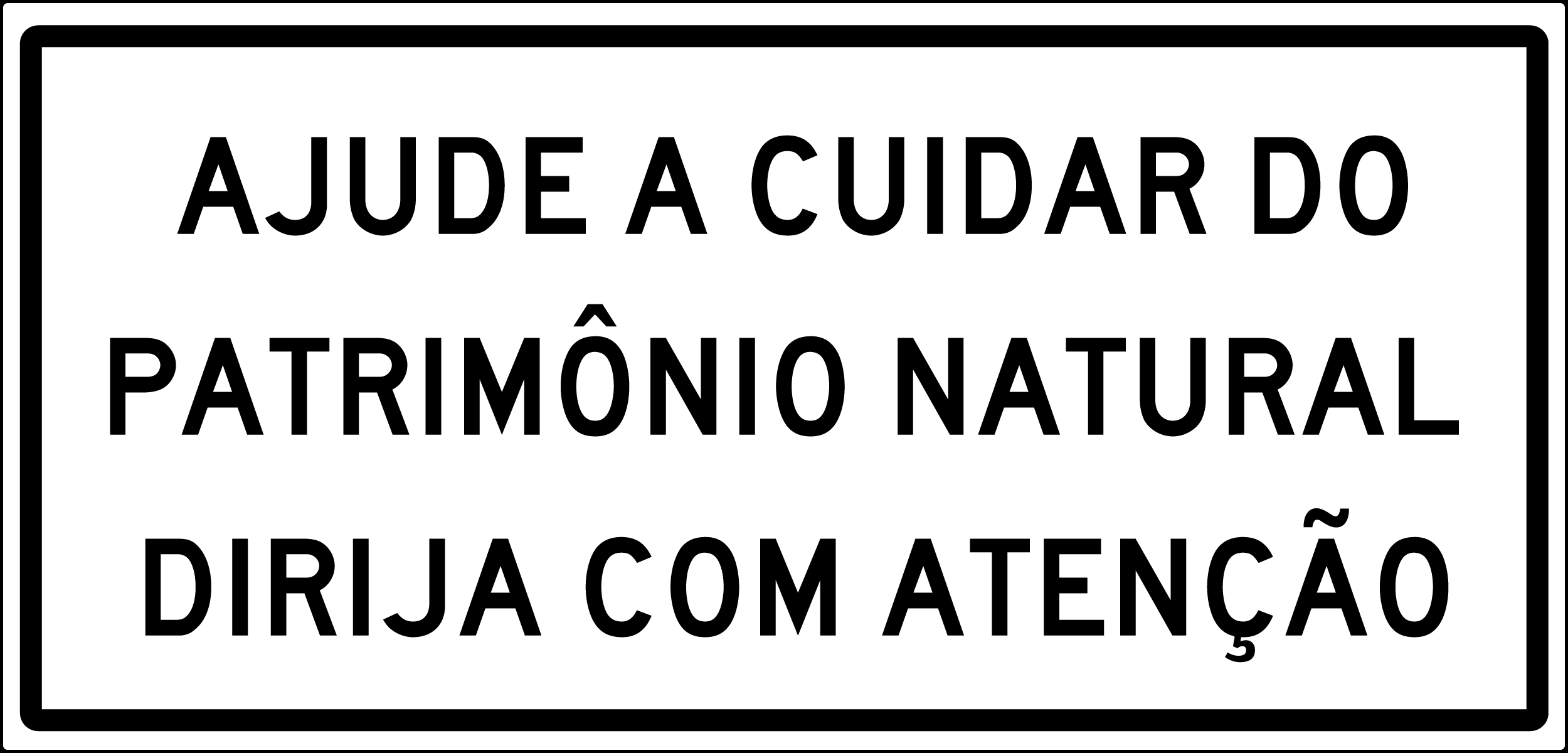
Help take care of our natural riches drive carefully

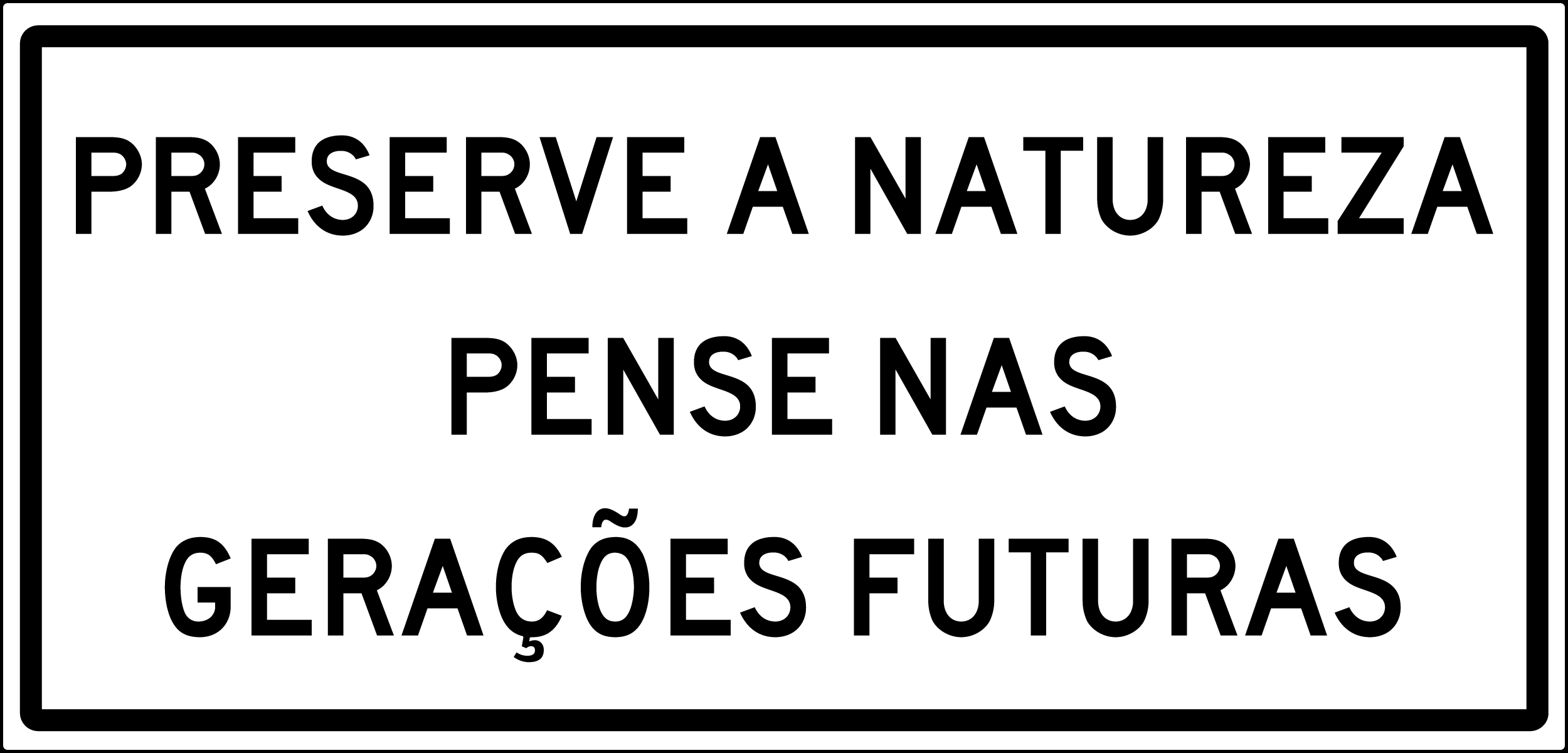
Preserve nature think of future generations

== Other signs ==
Zebra crossing	Highway indicative sign

== Retired signs ==
=== 1941 road signs ===
Mandatory direction	Mandatory direction	Mandatory direction	Mandatory direction	No entry	No vehicles	No waiting
No parking	Speed limit	No cars	No trucks	No motorcycles	No motor vehicles	Weight limit
Major road ahead	Stop	Caution	Hospital	School	Parking	Uneven road
Series of curves	Crossroads	Level crossing with gates	Level crossing without gates	Danger	Left curve	Right curve
Left curve on ascent	Right curve on ascent	Left curve on descent	Right curve on descent

=== 1968 road signs ===
==== Warning signs ====
Sharp curve	Sharp curve	Sharp turn	Sharp turn	Reverse curve	Reverse curve	Winding road
Crossroad	Side road	Side road	Side road	Side road	T-junction	Y-junction
Crossroad with priority	Side road with priority	Side road with priority	Y-junction with priority	Y-junction with priority	Side road with priority	Side road with priority
T-junction with priority	T-junction with priority	Stop ahead	Yield ahead	Road narrows	Dip	Bump
Rough road	Uneven road	Steep ascent	Steep descent	Narrow bridge	Opening bridge	Slippery road
Pedestrian crossing	Children	Animals	Uncontrolled level crossing	Controlled level crossing	Level crossing	Height limit ahead
Width limit ahead	Roadwork	Blind people	Danger	Yield

==== Regulatory signs ====
Stop	Priority road	End of priority road	Mandatory direction	Mandatory direction	Mandatory direction	Mandatory direction
No ahead only	No right turn	No left turn	No U-turn	No vehicles	No cars	No trucks
No trucks or animals	No bicycles	No motorcycles	No waiting	No overtaking	Weight limit	Speed limit
Width limit	Height limit	Parking	No parking	Use low headlamps when meeting opposing vehicles	No stopping on roadway	No entry
Exercise caution	No honking	Hospital	Bus stop	Taxi stand	Loading and unloading only

=== 1999 road signs ===
==== Warning signs ====
Left sharp curve	Right sharp curve	Left curve	Right curve	Winding road to right	Winding road to left	Double left sharp curve
Double right sharp curve	Double right curve	Double left curve	Crossroad	Right side road	Left side road	T-intersection
Y-intersection	Left side road at an acute angle	Right side road at an acute angle	Offset side roads	Offset side roads	Right merge	Left merge
Traffic lights ahead	Stop ahead	Rough road	Bump	Dip	Steep grade	Road narrows (both sides)	Road narrows (Left side)
Road narrows (Right side)	Narrow bridge	Draw bridge	Two-way traffic	Rockfall	Slippery road	Loose gravel
Bicycle crossing	Farm vehicles crossing	Pedestrian crossing	School crossing	Children	Domestic animals	Wild animals
Height limit ahead	Width limit ahead	Railroad crossing without gates	Railroad crossing with gates	Crossbuck	Divided highway begins	Divided highway ends
Low-flying planes	Crosswinds	Added right lane	Added left lane	Yield ahead	Pavement ends	Low shoulder

==== Regulatory signs ====
Stop	Yield	Do not enter	No left turn	No right turn	No U-turn	No parking
Parking	No stopping	Do not pass	No lane change	No trucks	No motor vehicles	No horse carts
No bicycles	No farm vehicles	Weight limit	Height limit	Width limit	Axle load limit	Length limit
Speed limit	No beeping	Checkpoint	Motor vehicles keep right	Turn right	Keep right	Turn left ahead
Turn right ahead	Straight and turn left only	Straight and turn right only	Straight only	Trucks keep right	Two-way traffic	No pedestrians
Pedestrians keep left	Pedestrians keep right
