= Signage =

Design or use of signs and symbols to communicate a message

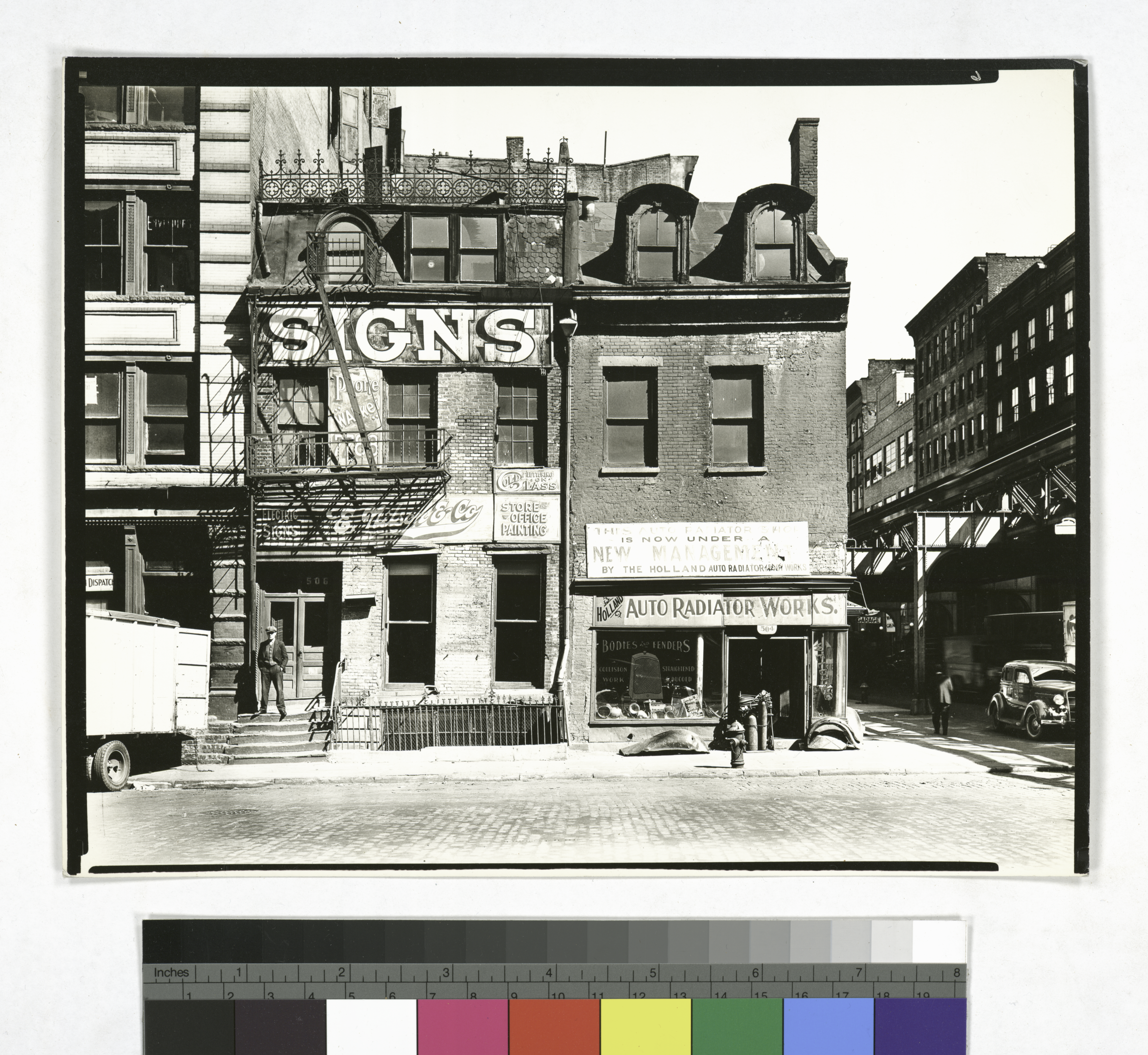
A photo of a sign shop on Broome Street, New York. By Berenice Abbott, 1935

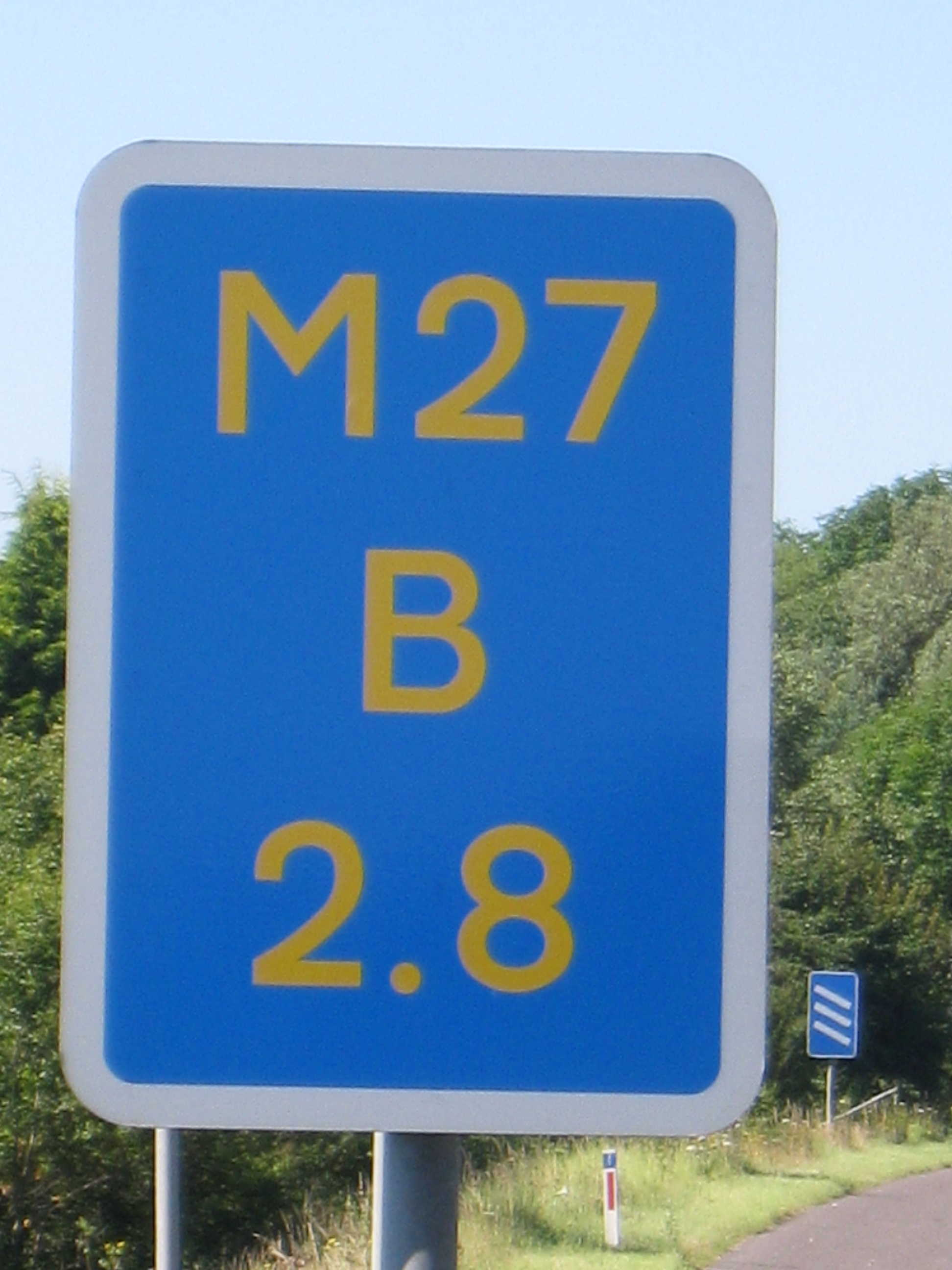
Driver location sign used in England to assist drivers when contacting emergency services

Signage is the design or use of signs and symbols to communicate a message. Signage also means signs collectively or being considered as a group. The term signage is documented to have been popularized in 1975 to 1980.

Signs are any kind of visual graphics created to display information to a particular audience. This is typically manifested in the form of wayfinding information in places such as streets or on the inside and outside buildings. Signs vary in form and size based on location, content and intent, from more expansive banners, billboards, and murals, to smaller street signs, street name signs, sandwich boards and lawn signs. Newer signs may also use digital or electronic displays.

The main purpose of signs is to communicate, to convey information designed to assist the receiver with decision-making based on the information provided. Alternatively, promotional signage may be designed to persuade receivers of the merits of a given product or service. Signage is distinct from labeling, which conveys information about a particular product or service.

== Definition and etymology ==
The term 'sign' comes from the old French signe (noun), signer (verb), meaning a gesture or a motion of the hand. This, in turn, stems from Latin 'signum' indicating an "identifying mark, token, indication, symbol; proof; military standard, ensign; a signal, an omen; sign in the heavens, constellation." In the English, the term is also associated with a flag or ensign. In France, a banner not infrequently took the place of signs or sign boards in the Middle Ages. Signs, however, are best known in the form of painted or carved advertisements for shops, inns, cinemas, etc. They are one of various emblematic methods for publicly calling attention to the place to which they refer.

The term 'signage' appears to have come into use in the 20th century as a collective noun used to describe a class of signs, especially advertising and promotional signs which came to prominence in the first decades of the twentieth century. The Oxford Dictionary defines the term signage as "Signs collectively, especially commercial or public display signs."

== History ==
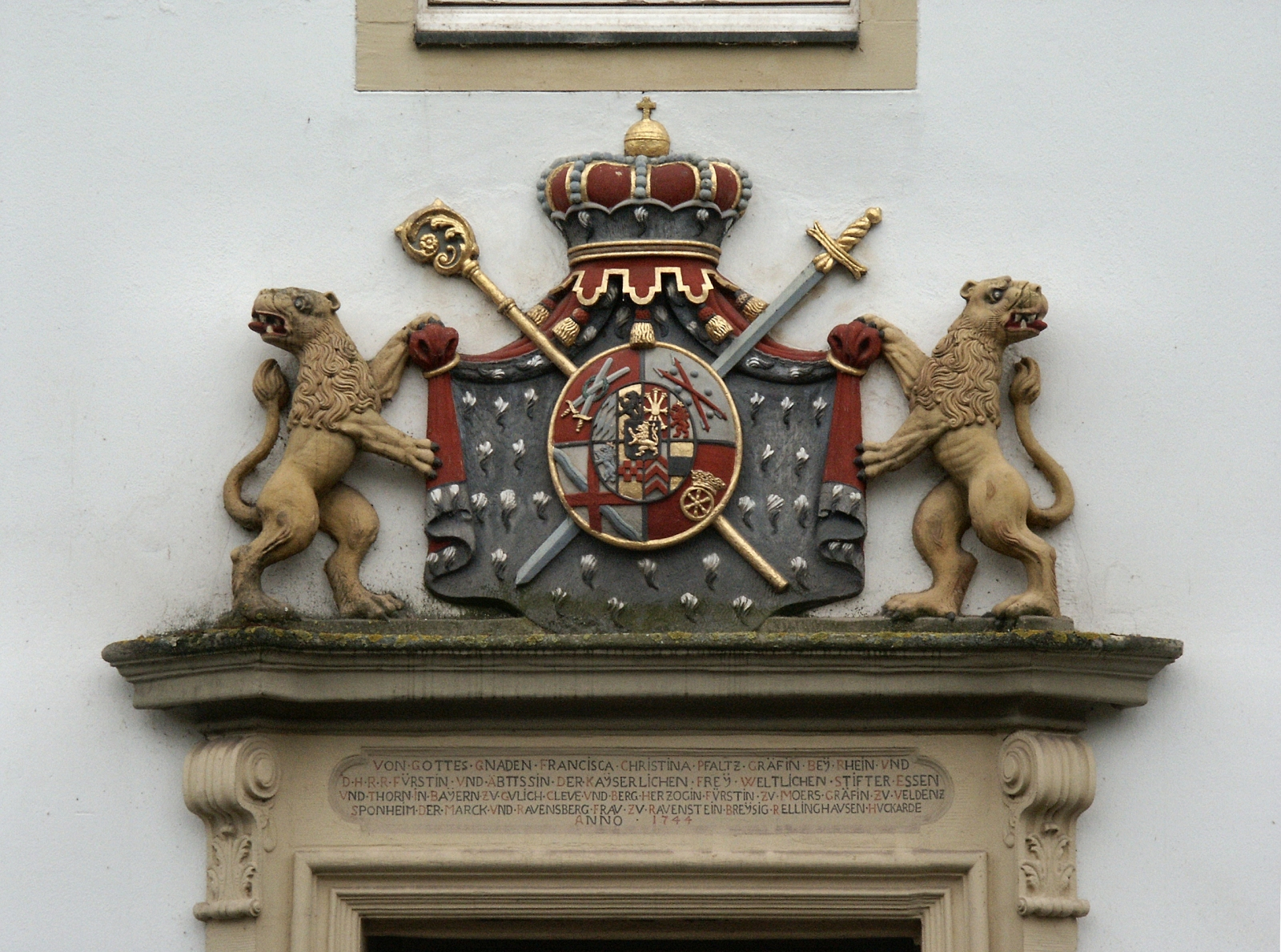
A coat of arms at Castle Borbeck

Some of the earliest signs were used informally to denote the membership of specific groups. Early Christians used the sign or a cross or the Ichthys (i.e. fish) to denote their religious affiliations, whereas the sign of the sun or the moon would serve the same purpose for pagans.

The use of commercial signage has a very ancient history. Retail signage and promotional signs appear to have developed independently in the East and the West. In antiquity, the ancient Egyptians, Romans and Greeks were known to use signage. In ancient Rome, signboards were used for shop fronts as well as to announce public events. Roman signboards were usually made from stone or terracotta. Alternatively, they were whitened areas, known as albums on the outer walls of shops, forums and marketplaces. Many Roman examples have been preserved; among them the widely recognized bush to indicate a tavern, from which is derived the proverb, "A good wine needs no bush". Apart from the bush, certain identifiable trade signs that survive into modern times include the three balls of pawnbrokers and the red and white barber's pole. Of the signs identified with specific trades, some of these later evolved into trademarks. This suggests that the early history of commercial signage is intimately tied up with the history of branding and labelling.

Recent research suggests that China exhibited a rich history of early retail signage systems. One well-documented, early example of a highly developed brand associated with retail signage is that of the White Rabbit brand of sewing needles, from China's Song dynasty period (960–1127 CE). A copper printing plate used to print posters contained message, which roughly translates as: "Jinan Liu's Fine Needle Shop: We buy high quality steel rods and make fine quality needles, to be ready for use at home in no time." The plate also includes a trademark in the form of a white rabbit which signified good luck and was particularly relevant to the primary purchasers, women with limited literacy. Details in the image show a white rabbit crushing herbs, and included advice to shoppers to look for the stone white rabbit in front of the maker's shop. Thus, the image served as an early form of brand recognition. Eckhart and Bengtsson have argued that during the Song dynasty, Chinese society developed a consumerist culture, where a high level of consumption was attainable for a wide variety of ordinary consumers rather than just the elite. The rise of a consumer culture prompted the commercial investment in carefully managed company image, retail signage, symbolic brands, trademark protection and sophisticated brand concepts.

During the Medieval period, the use of signboards was generally optional for traders. However, publicans were on a different footing. As early as the 14th century, English law compelled innkeepers and landlords to exhibit signs. In 1389, King Richard II of England compelled landlords to erect signs outside their premises. The legislation stated "Whosoever shall brew ale in the town with intention of selling it must hang out a sign, otherwise he shall forfeit his ale." Legislation was intended to make public houses easily visible to passing inspectors of the quality of the ale they provided (during this period, drinking water was not always good to drink and ale was the usual replacement). In 1393 a publican was prosecuted for failing to display signs. The practice of using signs spread to other types of commercial establishments throughout the Middle Ages. Similar legislation was enacted in Europe. For instance, in France edicts were issued 1567 and 1577, compelling innkeepers and tavern-keepers to erect signs.

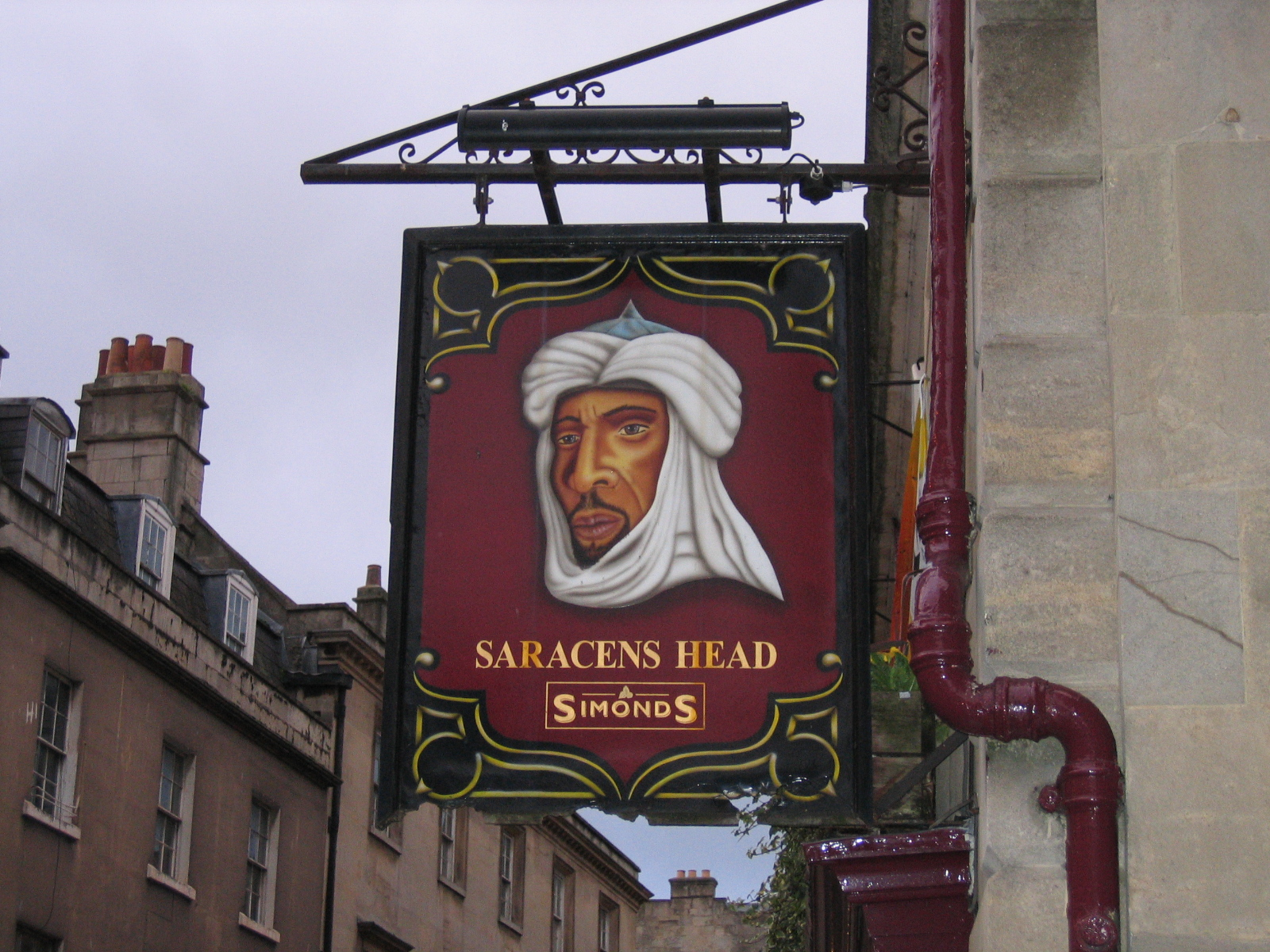
The Saracen's Head: a pub sign in Bath, Somerset, England

Large towns, where many premises practiced the same trade, and especially, where these congregated in the same street, a simple trade sign was insufficient to distinguish one house from another. Thus, traders began to employ a variety of devices to differentiate themselves. Sometimes the trader used a rebus on his own name (e.g. two cocks for the name of Cox); sometimes he adopted a figure of an animal or other object, or portrait of a well-known person, which he considered likely to attract attention. Other signs used the common association of two heterogeneous objects, which (apart from those representing a rebus) were in some cases merely a whimsical combination, but in others arose from a popular misconception of the sign itself (e.g. the combination of the leg and star may have originated in a representation of the insignia of the garter), or from corruption in popular speech (e.g. the combination goat and compasses is said by some to be a corruption of God encompasses).

Around this time, some manufacturers began to adapt the coats of arms or badges of noble families as a type of endorsement. These would be described by the people without consideration of the language of heraldry, and thus such signs as the Red Lion, the Green Dragon, etc., have become familiar, especially as pub signs. By the 17th and 18th centuries, the number of commercial houses actively displaying the royal arms on their premises, packaging and labelling had increased, but many claims of royal endorsement were fraudulent. By 1840, the rules surrounding the display of royal arms were tightened to prevent false claims. By the early 19th century, the number of royal warrants granted rose rapidly when Queen Victoria granted some 2,000 royal warrants during her reign of 64 years.

Since the object of signboards was to attract the public, they were often of an elaborate character. Not only were the signs themselves large and sometimes of great artistic merit (especially in the 16th and 17th centuries, when they reached their greatest vogue) but the posts or metal supports protruding from the houses over the street, from which the signs were swung, were often elaborately worked, and many beautiful examples of wrought-iron supports survive both in England and continental Europe.

Exterior signs were a prominent feature of the streets of London from the 16th century. Large overhanging signs became a danger and a nuisance in the narrow ways as the city streets became more congested with vehicular traffic. Over time, authorities were forced to regulate the size and placement of exterior signage. In 1669, a French royal order prohibited the excessive size of sign boards and their projection too far over the streets. In Paris in 1761, and in London, about 1762–1773, laws were introduced which gradually compelled sign boards to be removed or fixed flat against the wall.

For the most part, signs only survived in connection with inns, for which some of the greatest artists of the time painted sign boards, usually representing the name of the inn. With the gradual abolition of sign boards, the numbering of houses began to be introduced in the early 18th century in London. It had been attempted in Paris as early as 1512, and had become almost universal by the close of the 18th century, though not enforced until 1805. Another important factor was that during the Middle Ages a large percentage of the population was illiterate and so pictures were more useful as a means of identifying a public house. For this reason there was often no reason to write the establishment's name on the sign and inns opened without a formal written name—the name being derived later from the illustration on the public house's sign. In this sense, a pub sign can be thought of as an early example of visual branding.

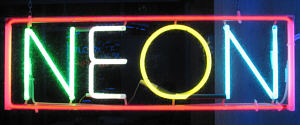
Neon sign

During the 19th century, some artists specialized in the painting of signboards, such as the Austro-Hungarian artist Demeter Laccataris. Pending this development, houses which carried on trade at night (e.g. coffee houses, brothels, etc.) had various specific arrangements of lights, and these still survive to some extent, as in the case of doctors' surgeries, and chemists' dispensaries.

Several developments in the early 20th century provided the impetus for widespread commercial adoption of exterior signage. The first, spectaculars, erected in Manhattan in 1892, became commonplace in the first decade of the 20th century and by 1913, "the skies were awash with a blaze of illuminated, animated signs." In the 1920s, the newly developed neon sign was introduced to the United States. Its flexibility and visibility led to widespread commercial adoption and by the 1930s, neon signs were a standard feature of modern building around the world. Privilege signs, which employed the manufacturer's brand as a form of retail endorsement, were common on retail stores during the 20th century, but their use has waned as retailers gained increasing power in the late 20th century. A small number of privilege signs are still present, but most have become abandoned ghost signs.

An early computer generated hard copy of various size metal printed characters for displays was introduced and patented in 1971, Patent US3596285A, may have been the first data driven printed example of signage in the USA.

Historic retail sign boards

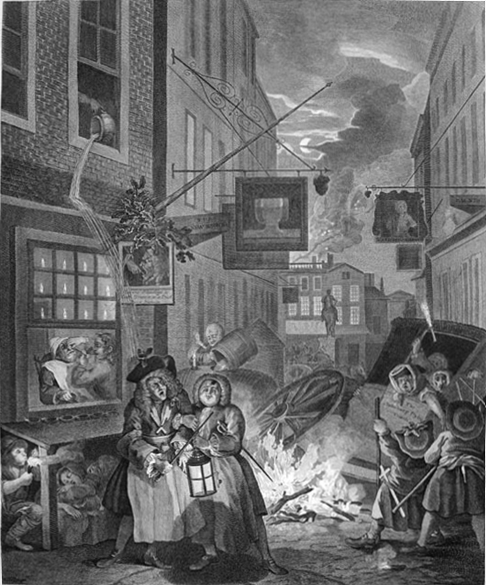
Four Times Night painting by William Hogarth depicting a retail sign c. 1738

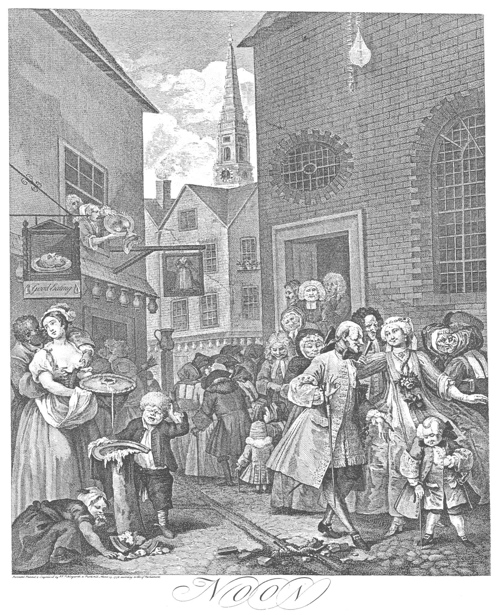
Four Times of the Day: Noon by William Hogarth, painting depicting retail signage, 18th century

Four Times of the Day: Noon by William Hogarth, (detail), 18th century

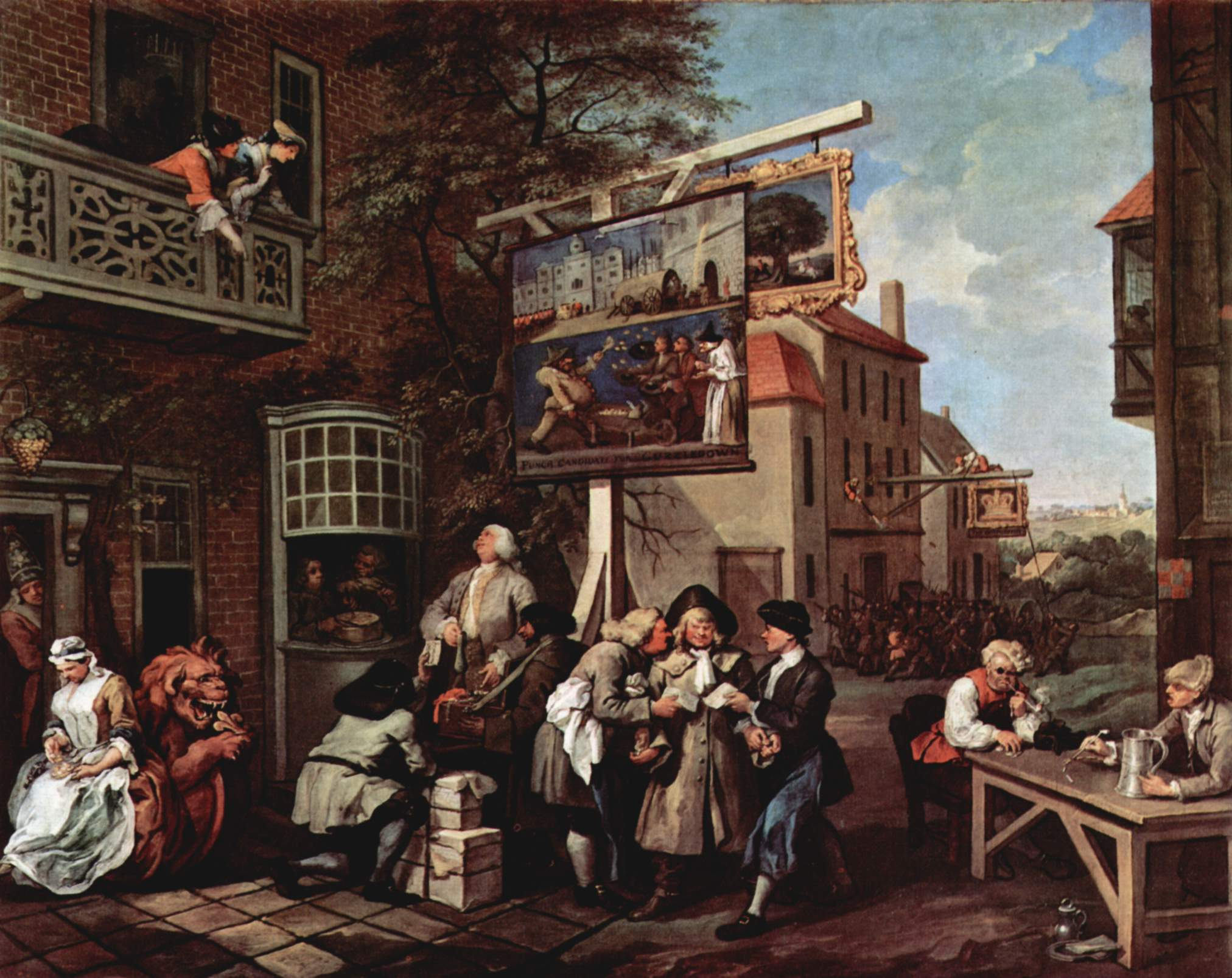
Painting by William Hogarth, depicting large, overhanging retail sign, 18th century

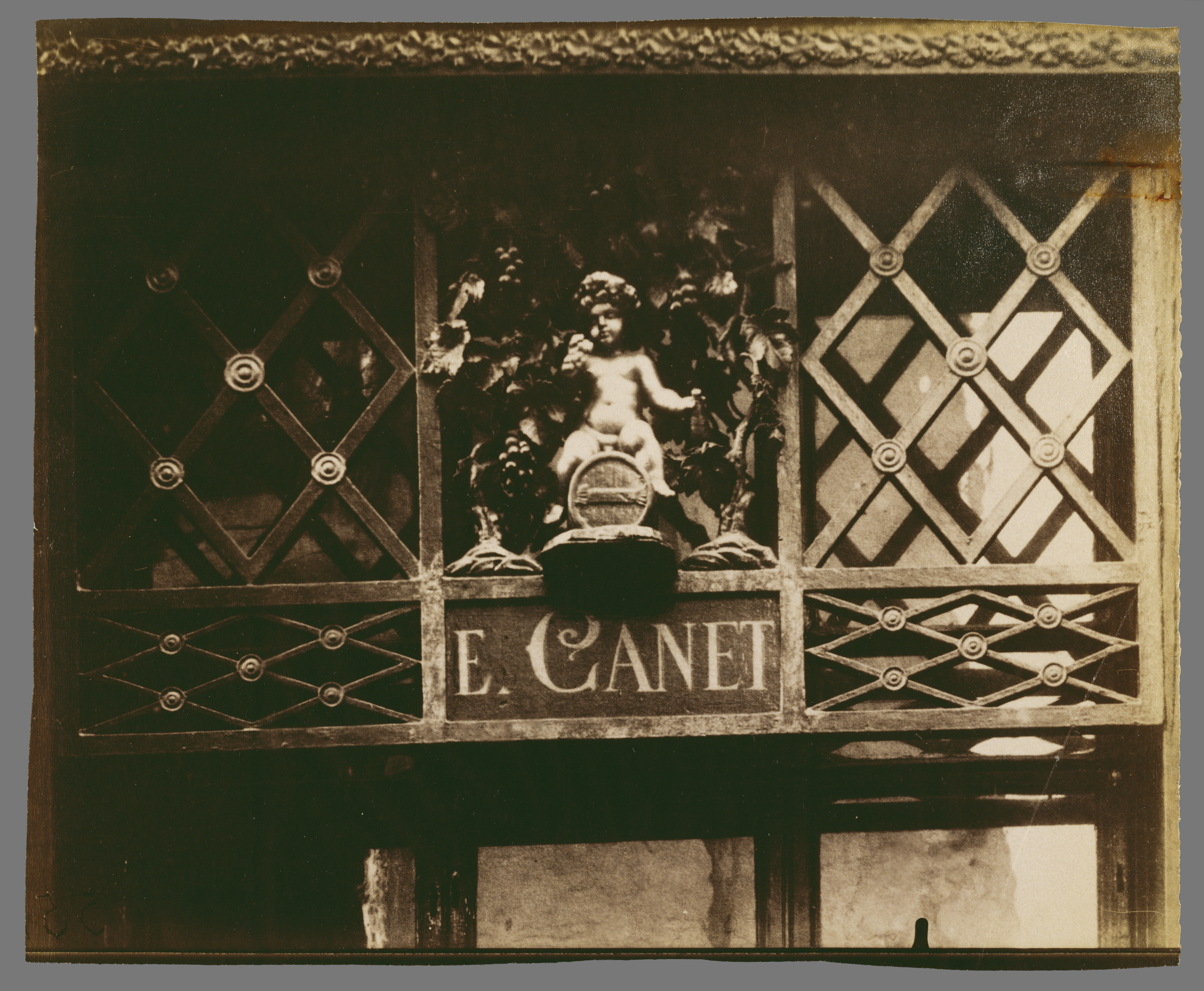
Eugène Atget, Shop Sign, rue Saint-Louis-en-l'Île, c. 1908

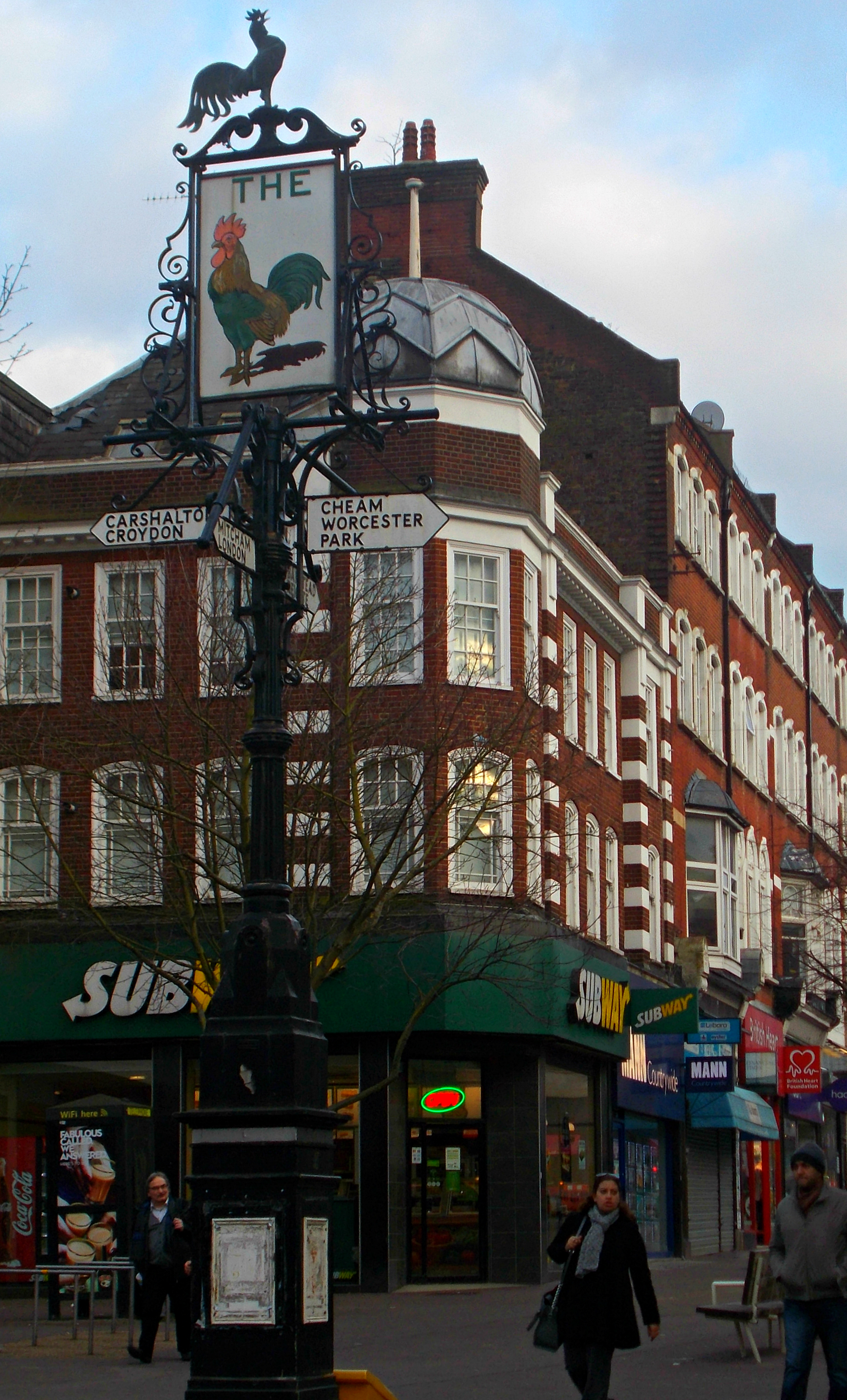
Inn sign above historic crossroads, Sutton, Surrey, Greater London

== Role and function of signage ==
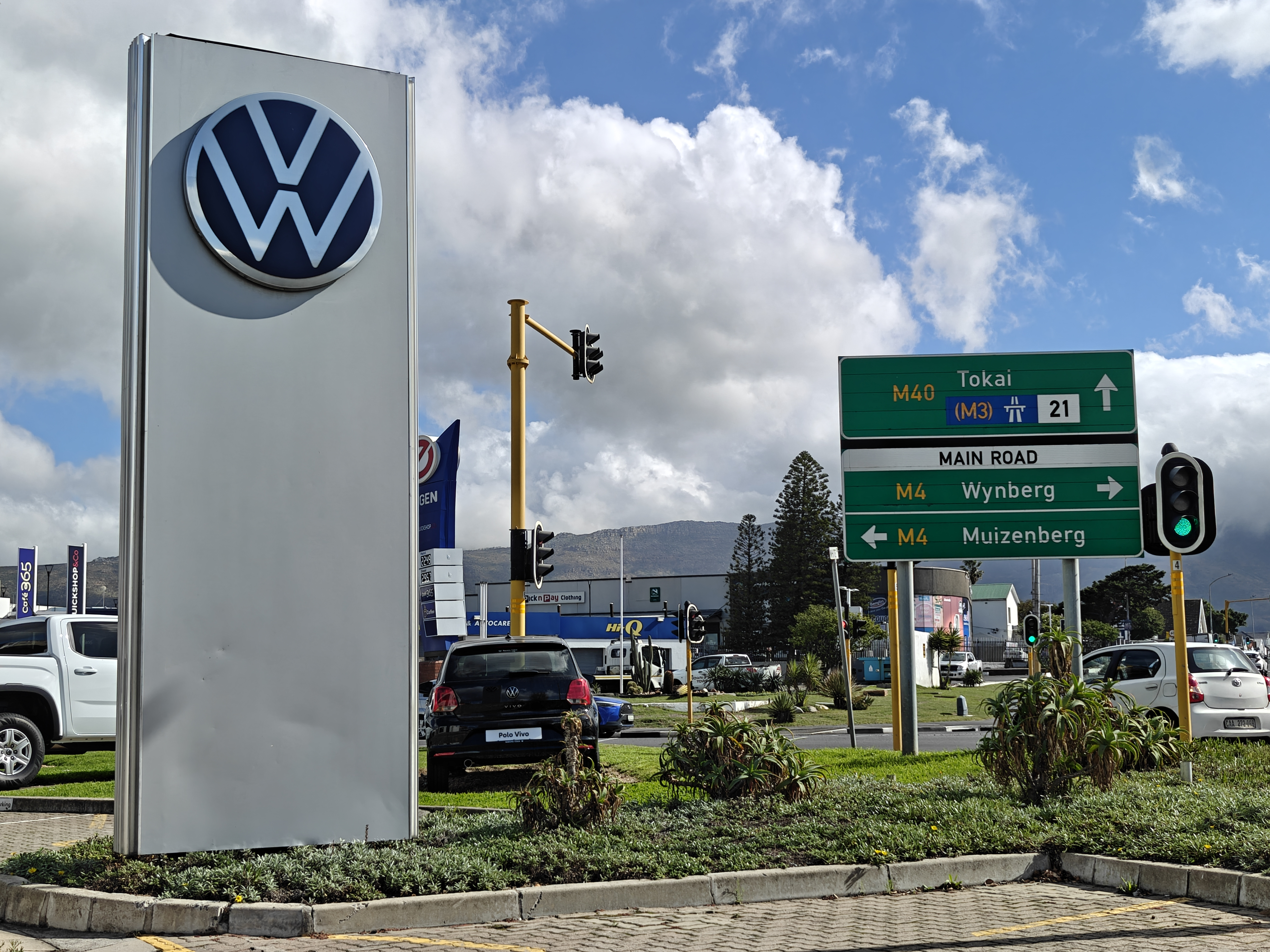
Signage in Cape Town for a Volkswagen dealership (left), roadway (right), and Engen gas station (rear)

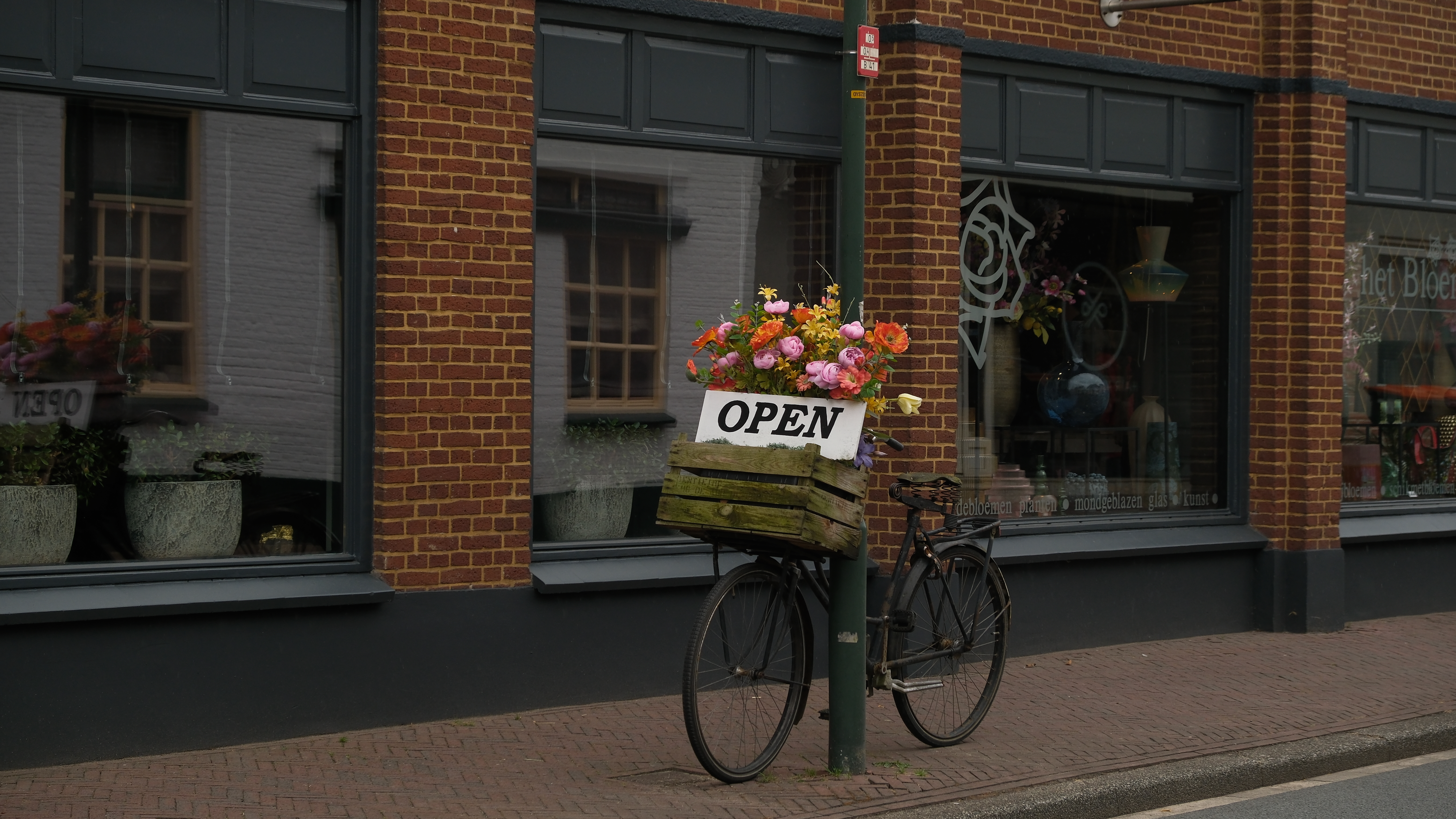
This sign on a bike in the Netherlands tells the passers-by that a flower shop is open.

In general, signs perform the following roles or functions:

- Information-provision: signs conveying information about services and facilities, such as maps, directories, instructional signs or interpretive signage used in museums, galleries, zoos, parks and gardens, exhibitions, tourist and cultural attractions that enhance the customer's experience. Retail signage state product names or simply the prices. Highway signs, Billboards, digital displays of stock market quotes, etc.
- Persuasion: promotional signage designed to persuade users of the relative merits of a company, product or brand.
- Direction/ Navigation: signs showing the location of services, facilities, functional spaces and key areas, such as sign posts or directional arrows.
- Identification: signs indicating services and facilities, such as room names and numbers, restroom signs, or floor designations.
- Safety and Regulatory: signs giving warning or safety instructions, such as warning signs, traffic signs, exit signs, signs indicating what to do in an emergency or natural disaster or signs conveying rules and regulations.
- Navigation – may be exterior or interior (e.g. with interactive screens in the floor as with "informational footsteps" found in some tourist attractions, museums, and the like or with other means of "dynamic wayfinding").

Signs may be used in exterior spaces or on-premises locations. Signs used on the exterior of a building are often designed to encourage people to enter and on the interior to encourage people to explore the environment and participate in all that the space has to offer. Any given sign may perform multiple roles simultaneously. For example, signage may provide information, but may also serve to assist customers navigate their way through a complex service or retail environment.

== Signage conventions ==
=== Pictograms ===
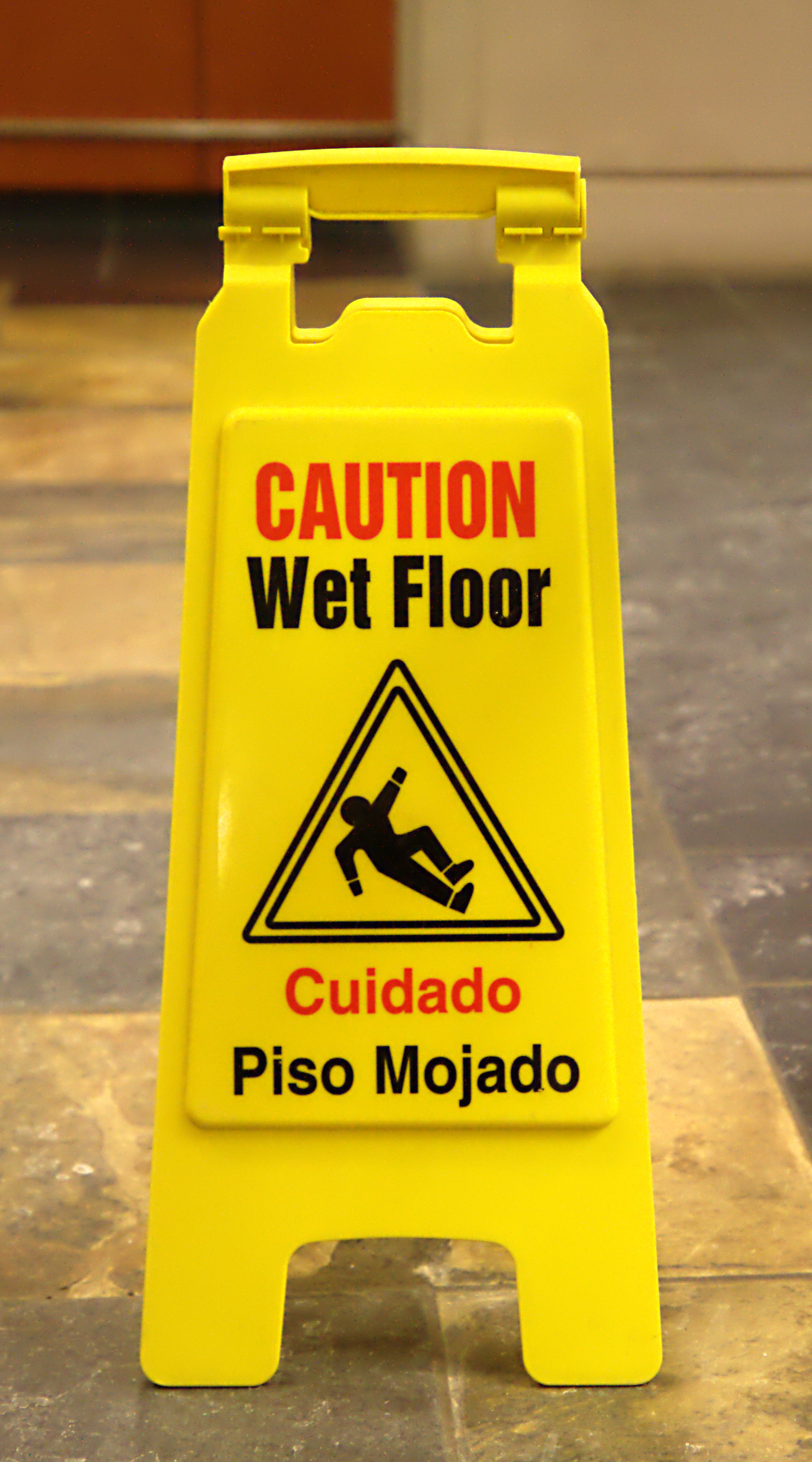
A bilingual wet floor sign

Pictograms are images commonly used to convey the message of a sign. In statutory signage, pictograms follow specific sets of colour, shape and sizing rules based on the laws of the country in which the signage is being displayed. For example, In UK and EU signage, the width of a sign's pictogram must be 80% the height of the area it is printed to. In the US, to comply with the ADA Accessibility Guidelines, the same pictogram must be located within its own defined field, with raised characters and braille located beneath the field.

For a pictogram to be successful it must be recognizable across cultures and languages, even if there is no text present. Following standard color and shape conventions increases the likelihood that the pictogram and sign will be universally understood.

=== Sign shape ===
The shape of a sign can help to convey its message. Shape can be brand- or design-based, or can be part of a set of signage conventions used to standardize sign meaning. Usage of particular shapes may vary by country and culture.

Some common signage shape conventions are as follows:

- Rectangular signs are often used to portray general information to an audience.
- Circular signs often represent an instruction that must be followed, either mandatory or prohibitive.
- Triangular signs are often warning signs, used to convey danger or caution.

== Sign technology ==
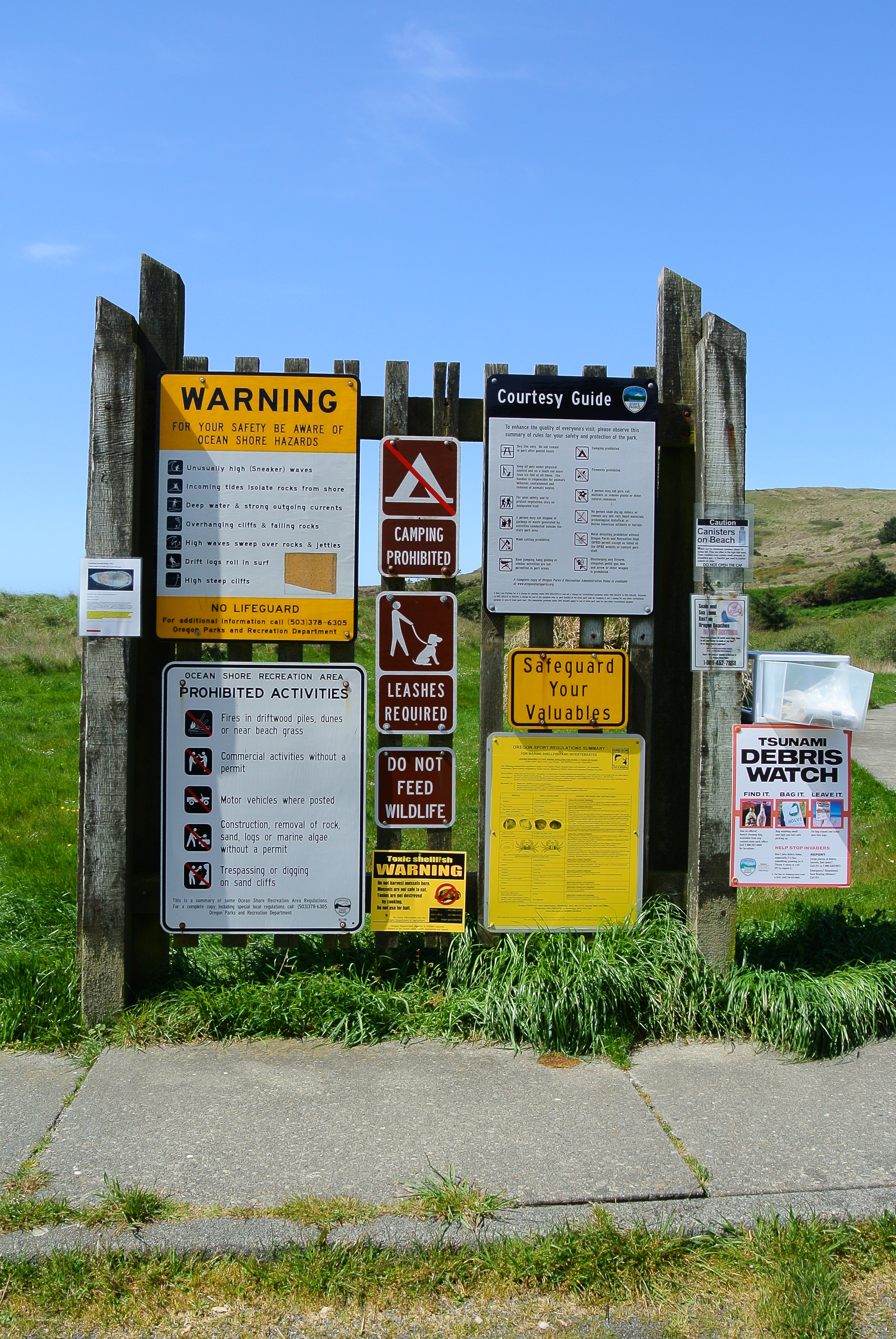
Several types of signs and sign materials in Oregon, US

=== Materials ===
Below is a list of commonly used materials in signmaking shops.

- Acrylic
- Aluminium composite panel
- Corrugated plastic
- High-density polyethylene (HDPE)
- High-density polyurethane
- Medium density overlay panels
- Modular curved frame technology
- Oilcloth
- Polyvinyl chloride (PVC or vinyl)
- Polycarbonate
- Polypropylene, polystyrene, and other thermoplastics
- Wood
- Stainless Steel
- Plexiglass
- Channelume Signs

=== Processes ===
Below is a list of commonly used processes in signmaking shops.

- CNC routing
- Laser cutting
- Abrasive blasting
- Plotter cutting
- Printmaking, Screen printing, or sign painting
- Channel lettering
- Vacuum forming
- Steam welding / rolling
- Laminating prints

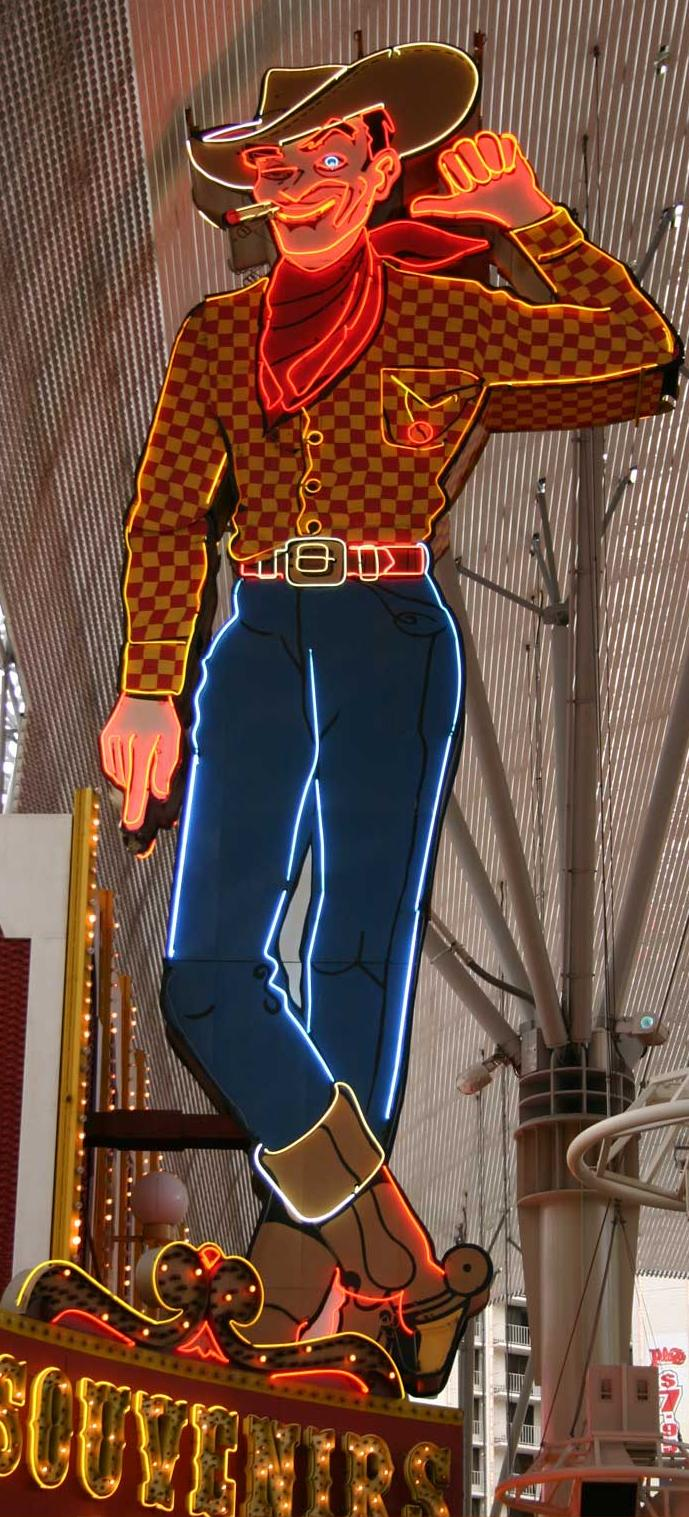
A 40 ft (12 m) neon sign built in 1951 for the Pioneer Club in Las Vegas, Nevada shows the elaborate artistic effects that can be achieved.

=== Lighting ===
Signs frequently use lighting as a means of conveying their information or as a way to increase visibility.

Neon signs, introduced in 1910 at the Paris Motor Show, are produced by the craft of bending glass tubing into shapes. A worker skilled in this craft is known as a glass bender, neon or tube bender.

Light-emitting diodes (LEDs ) are frequently used in signs for both general illumination, display of alphanumeric characters with animation effects, or as part of multi-pixel video displays. LED signs became common at sports venues, businesses, churches, schools, and government buildings. Brightness of LED signs can vary, leading to some municipalities in the United States banning their use due to issues such as light pollution.

== See also ==
- Barber's pole
- Brand implementation
- Digital signage
- Georges Claude
- Ghost sign
- Neon sign
- Neon lighting
- Privilege sign
- Semiotics
- Signwriter
- Trailblazing
