= SignPlot =

UK road sign designing software

- Original author: SK Morgan
- Developer: Buchanan Computing Ltd
- Release: 1984
- Stable release: 3.80 / 2023
- Operating system: Windows
- Available in: English, Welsh
- Type: Traffic sign design
- License: Proprietary
- Website: www.buchanancomputing.co.uk

SignPlot is a software application for the design of UK traffic signs and their supports and foundations using the built in SignLoad software, developed and sold by Buchanan Computing. The application is unique as it does not require the use of Computer-aided design (CAD) software.

== History ==
Initially created in the early 1980s as a university project by Simon Morgan, SignPlot 3 has undergone several updates. The program is designed to automate almost all the layout and spacing rules of the Traffic Signs Regulations and General Directions, Traffic Signs Manual Chapter 7, and drawings issued by the Welsh Assembly Government for bilingual signing.

In 2023, graphic designer Margaret Calvert held an exhibition titled Roadworks in Margate, featuring a number of reinterpreted traffic sign designs created with the aid of SignPlot. Calvert previously worked with Simon Morgan for the Museum of Modern Art Automania exhibition in New York during 2021. They used SignPlot software to restore and recreate Calvert's original 1960s designs for the exhibition pieces.

Version 3.80 is the latest update in 2023.

== See also ==
- Road signs in the United Kingdom
- Traffic sign
- Highways Act 1980
- Highway Code
- Road Traffic Regulation Act 1984
