= Traffic sign design =

Design of road signs

Traffic sign design involves any tasks in the process of designing traffic signage. Traffic signs may provide information about the law, warn about dangerous conditions and guide roadway users. Traffic signs vary depending upon their use, using different symbols, colors and shapes for easy identification.

== Types of signs ==
=== Regulatory signs on the road ===
No left turn

Regulatory signs “give a direction that must be obeyed.” Often these signs show a content or action that is either mandatory or prohibited and these two modes are signified by colour (i.e. blue and red), orientation (i.e. a filled circle and an open circle with a diagonal line through the centre) and/or shape (i.e. a square and triangle). In the UK, positive upright signs are generally circular with a white border and symbol on a blue background. In Ontario, Canada, positive signs have a green circle. The colour red is used almost universally to prohibit a certain activity, however a vide variety of designs exist even for most stop signs. In the United States, regulatory signs usually have a white background.

=== Warning signs ===
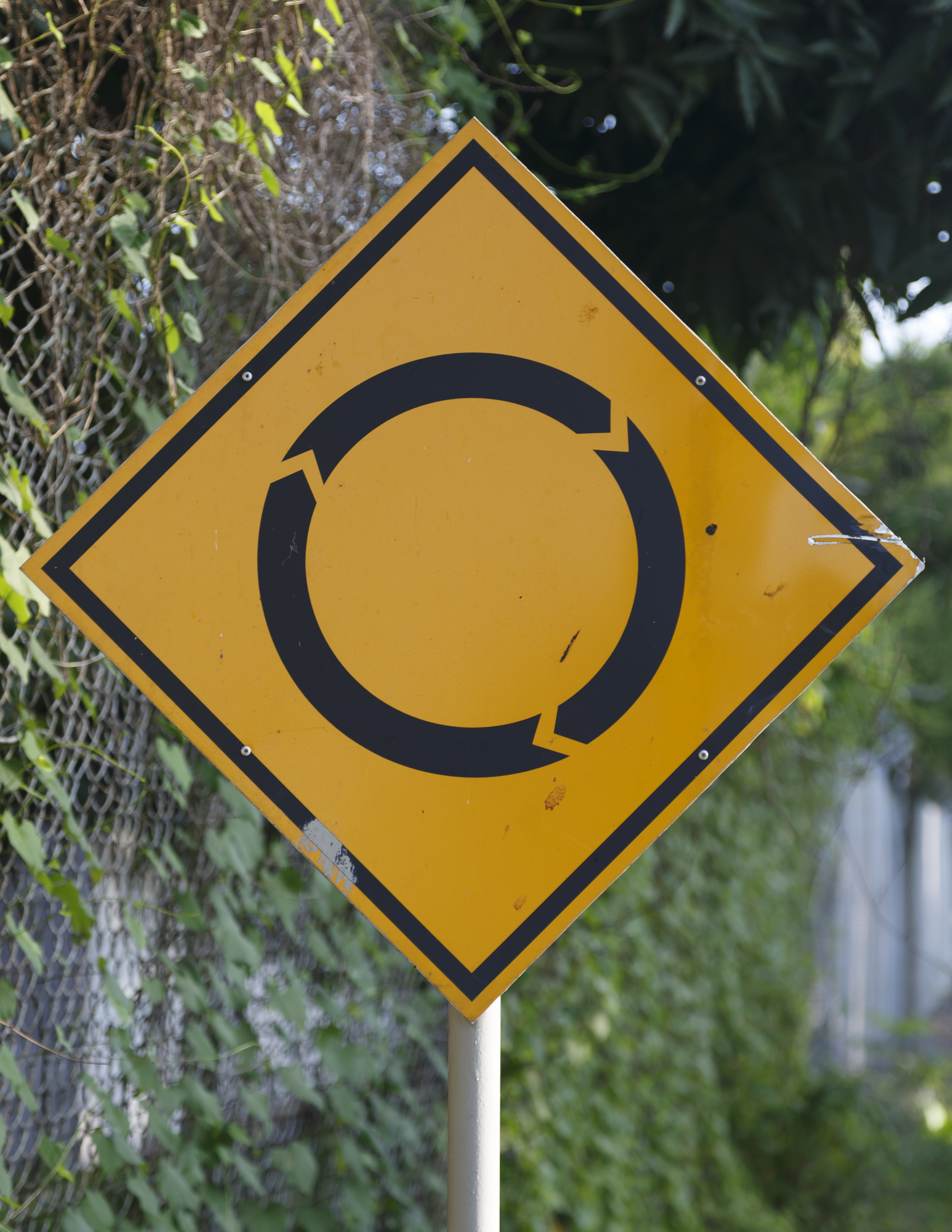
Warning sign (Malaysia)

Warning signs give a warning of that there are dangerous or unusual conditions ahead (a curve, turn, dip or sideroad). They are usually diamond-shaped and have a yellow background with black letters or symbols.

Often these signs have a greater more conspicuous presence than a regulatory sign. These signs often do not have much text on them, as they should be internationally understood due to the nature of the message that they are conveying.

=== Information/directional signs ===
Shows route to airport

Information signs give information about direction and distance, usually guiding drivers to destinations, facilities, services and attractions. Often these signs have names of locations with an arrow pointing towards the direction of the destination and a number giving the approximate distance.

In the United States, these signs typically have a green background. Signs giving direction to roadside services, such as rest areas and fuel stations, have blue backgrounds, while signs providing guidance to recreational locations have brown backgrounds.

=== Temporary condition signs ===
These non-permanent temporary signs are erected to warn drivers of unexpected conditions such as road work zones, diversions, detours, lane closures and traffic control.

Often these signs are portable and can also be digital variable message signs. In the United States, these signs are typically orange in color.

== Interaction design and traffic signs ==
When designing traffic signs it is recommended to follow the four basic steps of interaction design: Identifying needs and establishing user requirements, developing alternative designs, building interactive versions, evaluating the designs.

=== Identifying needs and establishing requirements ===
Drivers, cyclists, pedestrians and other types of pedestrians are the users that will be interacting with traffic signs. These users are using the roadways for transportation purposes and must receive information about the roadways and their destinations as they are traveling.

=== Developing alternative designs ===
This task is divided into two categories: conceptual design and physical design. Conceptual design will be the discussion of alternative traffic signs and ways of conveying information to the users. Physical design will be the discussion of what physical aspects (i.e. colour, shape, orientation) will be on the sign to convey the messages identified during the conceptual design.

=== Building interactive versions ===
This task is the actual building of traffic signs. These can be prototypes of a very low or very high fidelity.

=== Evaluating designs ===
This task is the testing of the prototypes and actual signs in order to determine if they convey the desired message in the desired time by the appropriate users. This will let the users know the usability of their signs.

== Design principles ==
Traffic sign comprehension and understandability are higher when the signs comply with ergonomic principles. It is recommended to follow the below principles in order to increase driver comprehension and understandability.

=== Spatial compatibility ===
The matching between the physical symbols on a sign with the literal directions/information the sign is trying to convey. “The physical arrangement in space, relative to the position of information and directions.” For example, a regulatory sign that informs a driver that they must turn right, should have an image of an arrow that curves to the right.

=== Conceptual compatibility ===
The correct association between the physical symbols on a sign and the information the sign is trying to convey. Good conceptual compatibility means that a driver will know the meaning of a symbol without having to reflect and interpret its meaning. For example, a sign with a picture of an airplane is a clear indication that the sign is providing direction to an airport.

=== Physical representation ===
The similarity between the information that is being represented and the actual content on a sign. Good physical representation means that a driver will experience what is shown on a sign. Signs for pedestrian crossings, for example, show an image of a person walking.

=== Frequency ===
The frequency that which a sign appears will determine how familiar it is to drivers. Good frequency means that the sign is used often and that the meaning of its contents is well known. As an example, speed limit signs need to be placed frequently enough that a driver will see a sign when they need to know the speed limit.

=== Standardization ===
The extent to which any sign can be grouped into a type of sign with similar or equal shape, colour and orientation. Good standardization means that all signs of the same type have the same template of shape, colour and orientation. Ideally standardization should be across cities, regions and countries. In the United States, the Manual on Uniform Traffic Control Devices (MUTCD) sets standard shapes and designs for signs throughout the United States to ensure that they are consistent. The Vienna Convention on Road Signs and Signals is a multilateral treaty to standardize the signing system for road traffic in use internationally.

=== Singular functionality ===
The representation of only a single meaning for a single sign. Good singular functionality means that a sign that gives information should not also imply a regulatory meaning or another piece of related information. This means that a school zone warning sign only provides a warning that there is a school nearby. A change in speed limit would require a separate sign.

=== Visibility ===
The extent to which any sign can be seen. It should be visible by drivers of all age groups from an appropriate distance that will allow the driver to react to the signs contents. Visibility also means that the sign has enough contrast with the background to be conspicuous and that the contents on the sign have enough contrast with the background of the sign to be conspicuous. Most countries have regulatory manuals that specify the size of signs for roadways of certain speeds to ensure that signs are readable at the expected travel speed. Having contrasting colors, such as black on white, helps ensure visibility of signs, especially at night. Visibility can also be improved by lighting a sign, using either the power grid or solar power.
