= Demeter Laccataris =

Austrian portrait painter (1798–1864)

- Born: 1798; Vienna
- Died: 1864 (aged 65–66); Pest
- Occupation: portrait painter

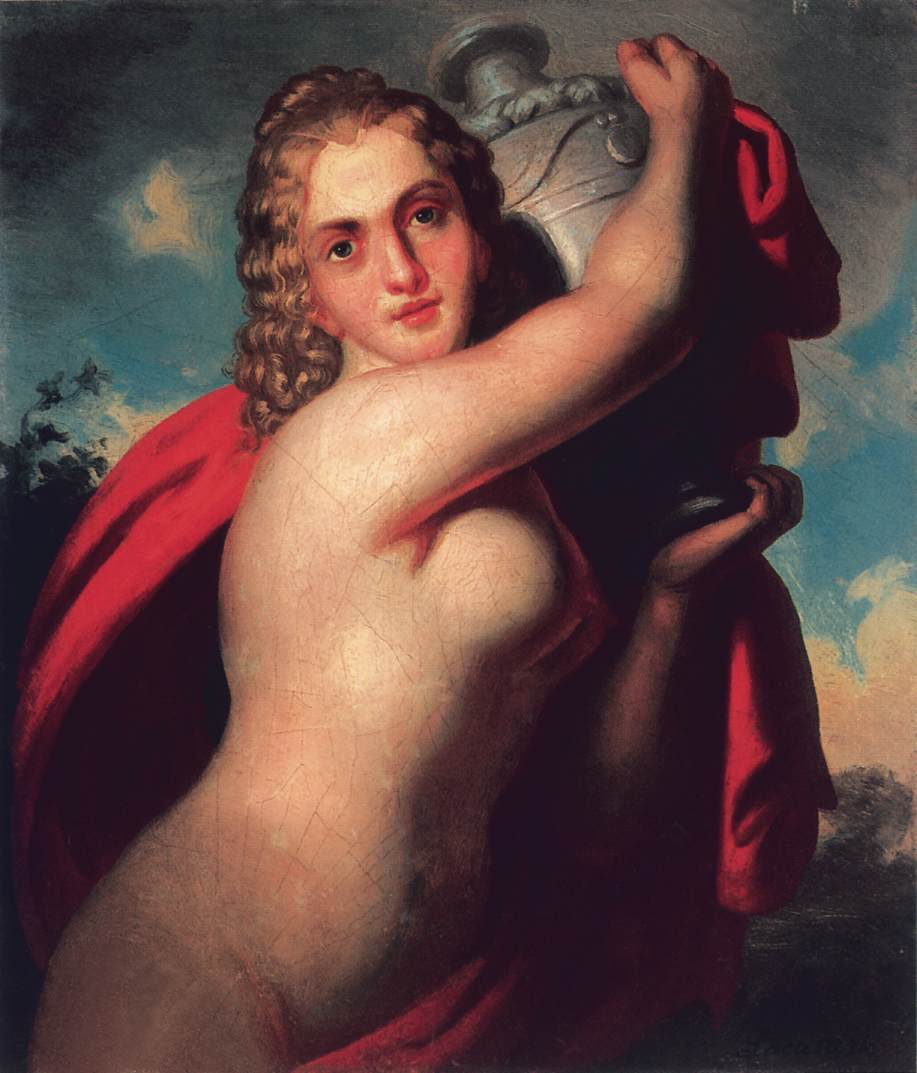
Bathing Woman (Hébe) by Demeter Laccataris, private collection, 1830

Demeter Laccataris (1798 – 24 December 1864) was an Austrian portrait painter of Greek origin. Born in Vienna, he studied at Debrecen and Vienna. He was based at Pest from around 1835 and painted portraits and altarpieces. He painted signboards as well. There is a representative collection exhibited at the Hungarian National Gallery.

He died at Pest.
