= Privilege sign =

Advertising sign

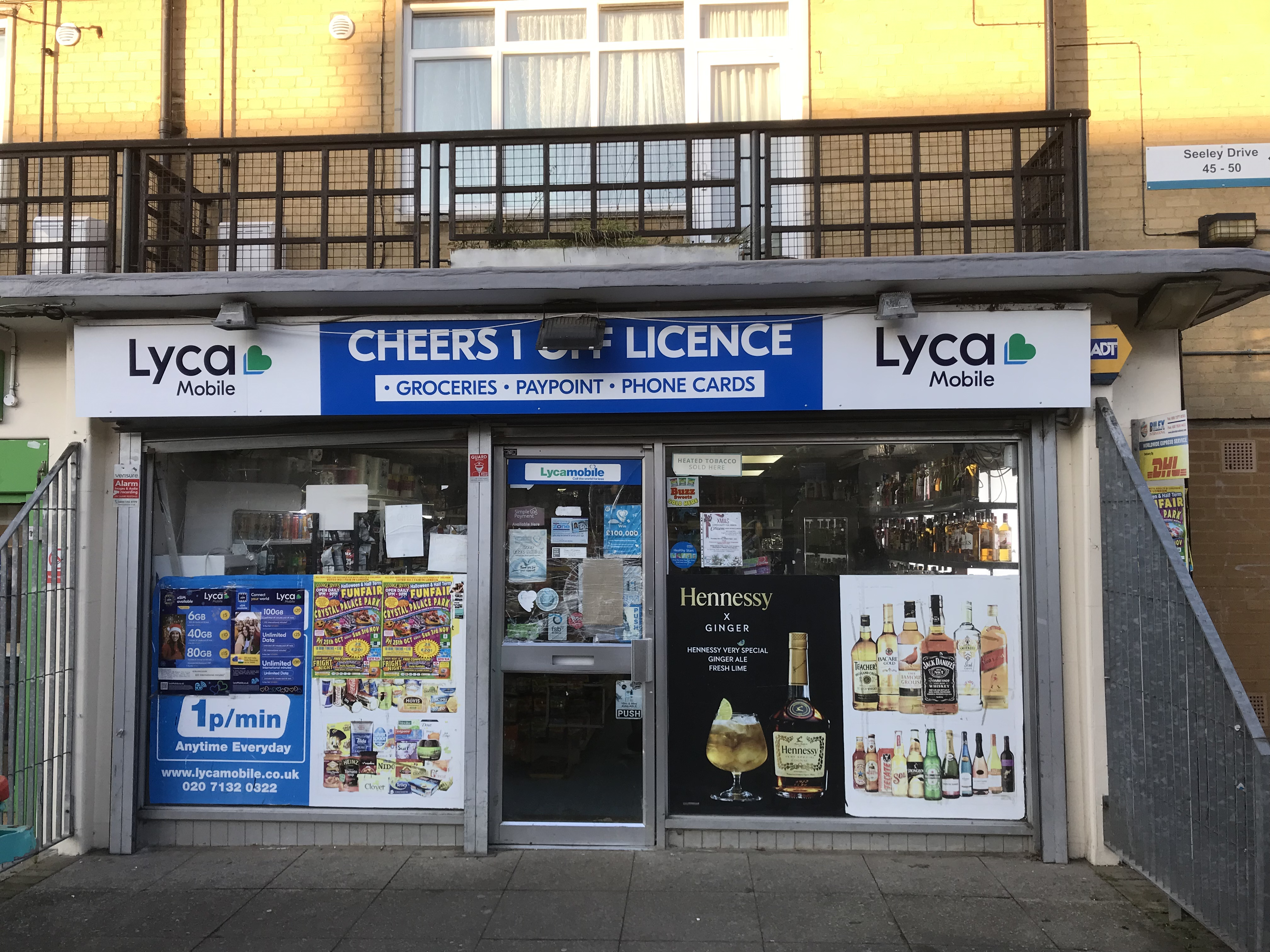
Lyca Mobile privilege sign on an off licence in London, UK

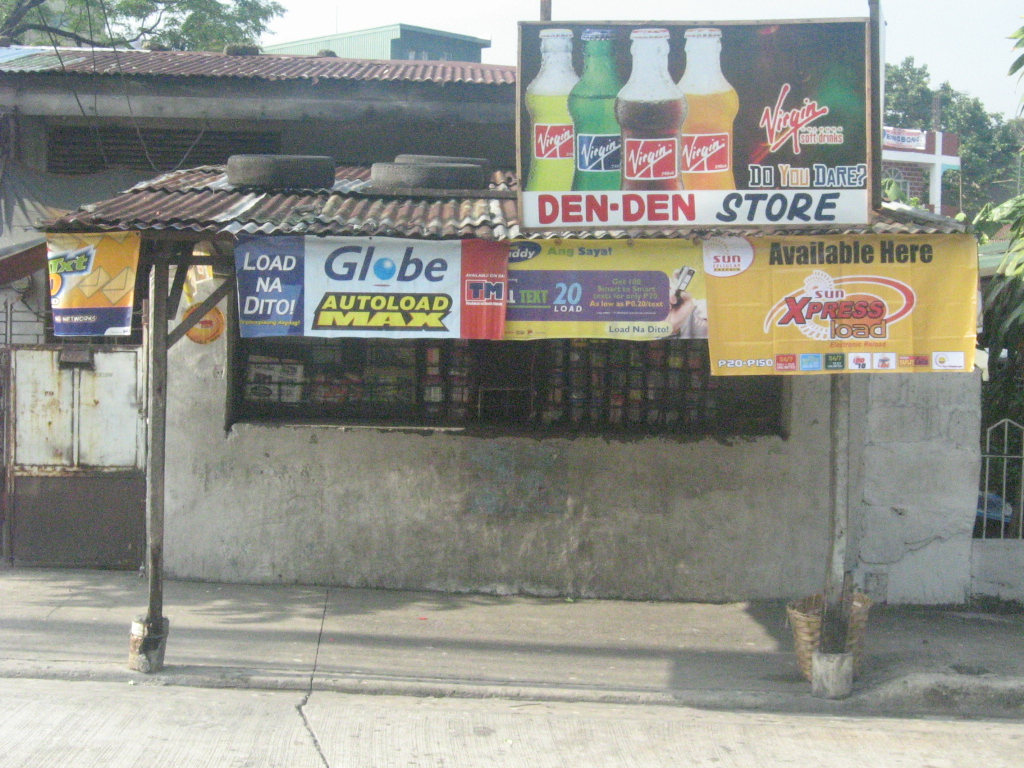
Privilege signs on a sari-sari store in the Philippines

A privilege sign is a retail store sign provided by a manufacturer, with the manufacturer's branding on it. The signs may be provided to the store at no cost, in return for the manufacturer's advertising on the sign. Examples include Coca-Cola signs, bar/tavern signage provided by breweries containing that brewery's brand logo above the establishment's name, and painted signs on sides of shops.

Privilege signs are no longer popular with manufacturers or stores in the United States, slowly disappearing from storefronts in that country. However, they remain a common fixture in other countries, such as sari-sari stores in the Philippines, where common sponsors of privilege signs include soft drinks, telecommunications services, soap brands and tobacco.

Similar such signs still appear on independent newsagents in the United Kingdom with Lycamobile and Coca-Cola being among the most prominent of brands to advertise.

== See also ==
- Ghost sign
