= Regulatory sign =

Type of road sign

A regulatory sign is used to indicate or reinforce traffic laws, regulations or requirements which apply either at all times or at specified times or places upon a street or highway, the disregard of which may constitute a violation, or a sign in general that regulates public behavior in places open to the public. The FHWA defines regulatory sign as "a sign that gives notice to road users of traffic laws or regulations".

== Traffic signs ==
Regulatory traffic signs follow international conventions, usually being:

- White circle or rectangle with red border, with a black pictogram, black text, or both
- Blue circle or rectangle with white border and white pictogram
- Red rectangle with white border and white text
- Red octagon with white border and white text (stop signs only)

=== United States ===

Regulatory traffic signs within the United States must comply with the federal Manual on Uniform Traffic Control Devices (MUTCD) or the State MUTCD, depending on the state in which the sign is installed. These signs typically have a white background with black or red legends (legends include text, symbols, graphics not part of the background); however, some specific signs may differ in their colors.

== Non-traffic signs ==
Examples of non-traffic types of regulatory signs might be tow-away signs for vehicles without disabled parking stickers or no-smoking signs where there are laws prohibiting smoking.

== See also ==
- Warning sign – Traffic signs that inform of hazards on roadways.
- Prohibitory sign – Traffic signs that inform of prohibited actions.
- Mandatory sign – Traffic signs that inform of required actions.
- Direction, position, or indication sign – Traffic signs that indicate directions, routes.
