= Mandatory sign =

Type of road sign

Uses Uses Uses Uses a combination of both Type A and Type B Uses (historically used) Does not use the mandatory sign group

Mandatory signs are road signs that are used to set the obligations of all traffic that uses a specific area of road. Most mandatory road signs are circular, and may use white symbols on a blue background with a white border, or black symbols on a white background with a red border, although the latter is also associated with prohibitory signs.

== Design ==
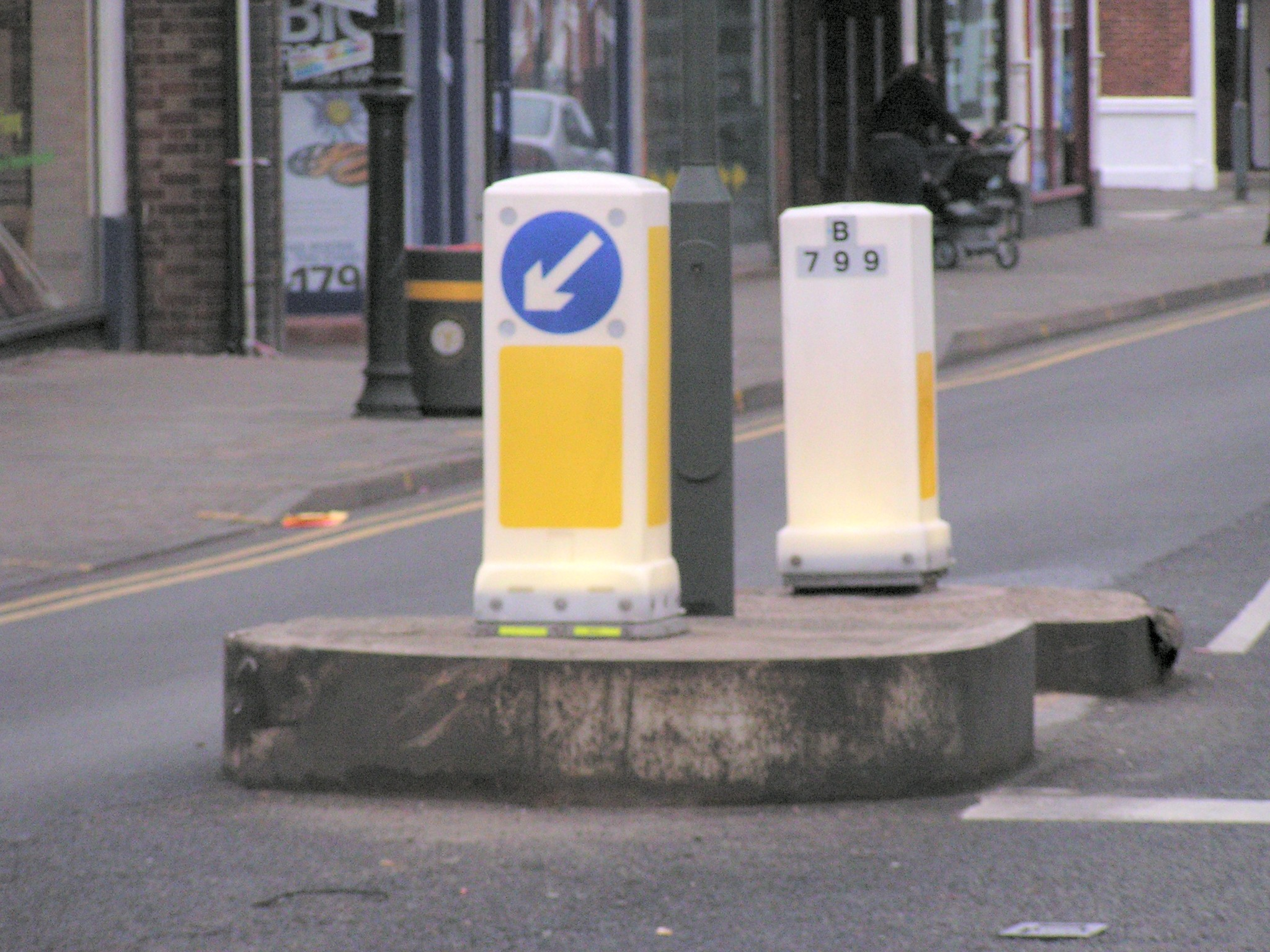
A "pass on the left" sign embedded into an illuminated plastic bollard in the United Kingdom

Mandatory signs are a subset of the regulatory sign group as defined by the United Nations Economic and Social Council in the Vienna Convention on Road Signs and Signals of 1968, and are often seen not just on their own, but used in conjunction with other signs, traffic lights and bollards as a form of visual shorthand within these objects. In Vienna Convention signatories, the mandatory sign is either a light blue circle with a white border (Type A) or a white circle with a red border (Type B). The sign must be at least 60 centimetres (24 in) across on rural roads, or 40 centimetres (16 in) in built-up areas, although mandatory signs incorporated in traffic lights, bollards or larger road signs can be as little as 30 centimetres (12 in) in diameter. The sign applies from the place it is displayed until the point where a contrary sign is displayed, otherwise until the next intersection.

The mandatory sign group is not used in Australia, Ecuador, or the United States, none of which except for Ecuador are signatories to the Vienna Convention. Canada has developed its own style using a green circle, which is not used in any other country. Below is a chart comparing some of the most common mandatory signs.

	Go straight ahead	Turn right	Permitted directions	Buses only	Trucks only	Bicycles only	Pedestrians only	Segregated pathway	Seatbelts required	Snow chains required
Type A										
Type B										
Canada										N/A (Note: Canada uses a type of sign other than mandatory for this purpose.)
Argentina								N/A	N/A	

== Uses ==
=== Segregation of roads ===
Mandatory road signs can be used to allocate certain areas to specific vehicles – the Vienna Convention explicitly mentions footpaths, cyclepaths and bridleways, but tramways, bus lanes, taxi lanes, HOV lanes and snowmobile tracks can also be designated with mandatory signs. When a specific area of roadway is designated with a mandatory sign specifying a vehicle type, all traffic of this type must use this area if possible. These signs can be combined by putting one pictogram above the other. If the pictograms are side-by-side however, with the sign divided by a white vertical line, each type of vehicle must stay within the lane indicated by the sign. A red line through a mandatory sign indicates not that a vehicle of a specific type is prohibited from entering into the designated area, but that the area is now deregulated and any vehicle may use it.

=== Instruction ===
Mandatory signs can also be used to issue instructions to all vehicles – common examples include "pass on this side" signs seen at roadworks, and "compulsory roundabout" signs seen at mini-roundabouts. Other signs of the type include "attach snow chains" and "remove snow chains" seen at the entry and exit points of mountainous areas, and "compulsory direction for vehicles carrying dangerous loads", used to divert vehicles carrying explosives or poisonous chemicals away from areas with open flames such as oil refineries. Minimum speed limits can also be defined using mandatory road signs, although such signs are rare in most countries; the U.S., which does not use mandatory signs, instead places minimum speed limits on the same type of panel as maximum speed limits.
