= Traffic warning sign =

Sign that warns people for a risk or danger

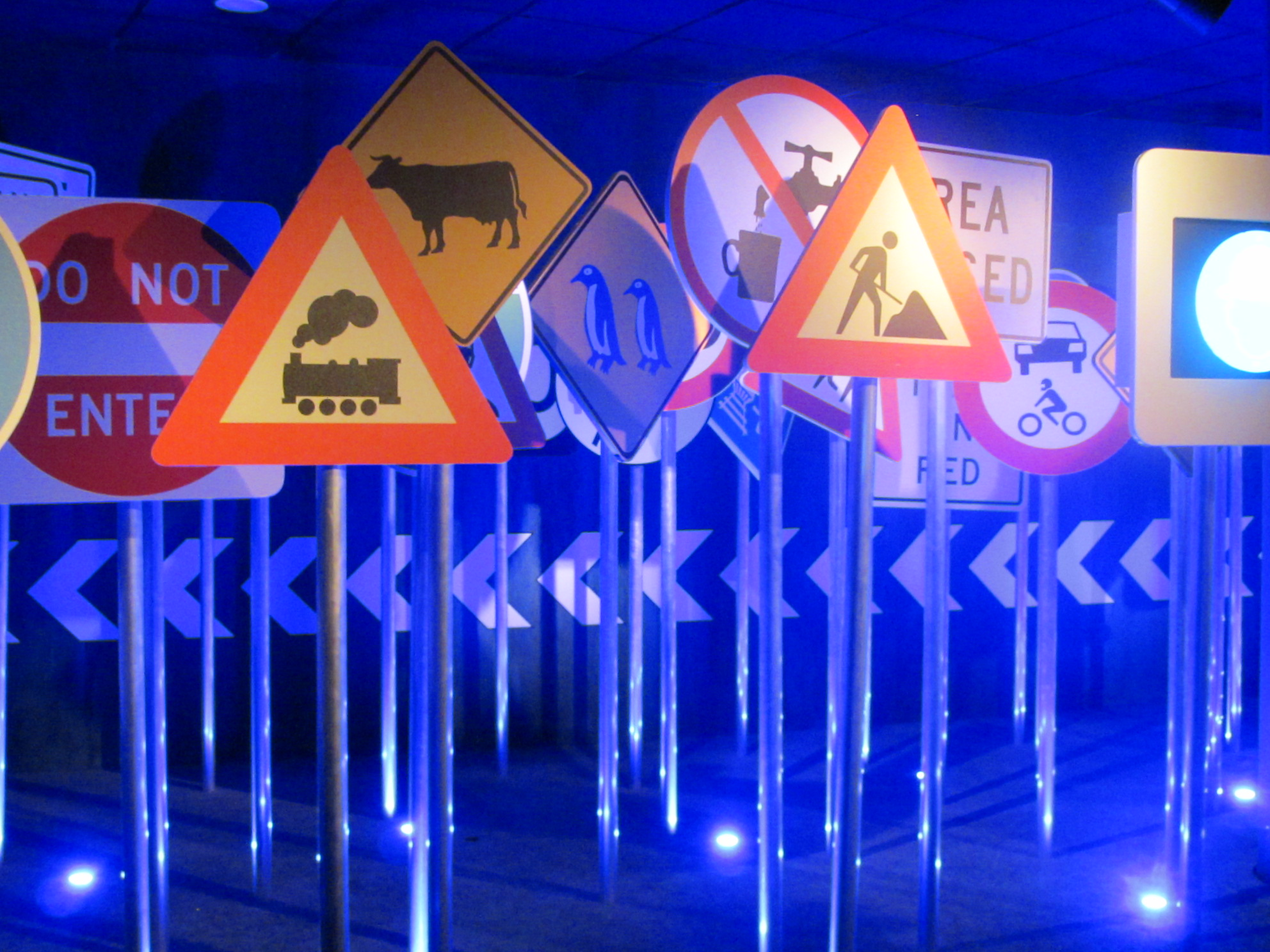
Exhibit mostly of warning signs (with some regulatory signs like Do Not Enter) at the Turin Automobile Museum

A warning sign is a type of sign which indicates a potential hazard, obstacle, or condition requiring special attention. Some are traffic signs that indicate hazards on roads that may not be readily apparent to a driver.

While warning traffic sign designs vary, they usually take the shape of an equilateral triangle with a white background and thick red border. In the People's Republic of China (excluding Macau and Hong Kong) and North Korea, they appear with a black border and a yellow background. In Sweden, Greece, Finland, Iceland, Poland, Cuba, Nigeria, South Korea and Vietnam, they have a red border with an amber background. The polar bear warning sign in Svalbard recently changed from displaying a black bear on white background to a white bear on black background (both signs are triangular with a red border). Some countries (like France, Norway and Spain) that normally use a white background have adopted an orange or amber background for road work or construction signs.

Warning signs in some countries have a diamond shape in place of the standard triangular shape. In the United States, Canada, Mexico, Australia, Japan, Liberia, Sri Lanka, New Zealand, most of Central and South America, some countries of Southeast Asia, and also Ireland (diverging from the standards of the rest of Europe) warning signs are black on a yellow background and usually diamond-shaped, while temporary signs (which are typically construction signs) are black on an orange background. Some other countries, like Argentina and Taiwan, use a combination of triangle and diamond-shaped warning signs.

The warning signs usually contain a symbol. In Europe they are based on the UNECE Vienna Convention on Road Signs and Signals. In the United States they are based on the MUTCD standard and often contain text only.

== History ==
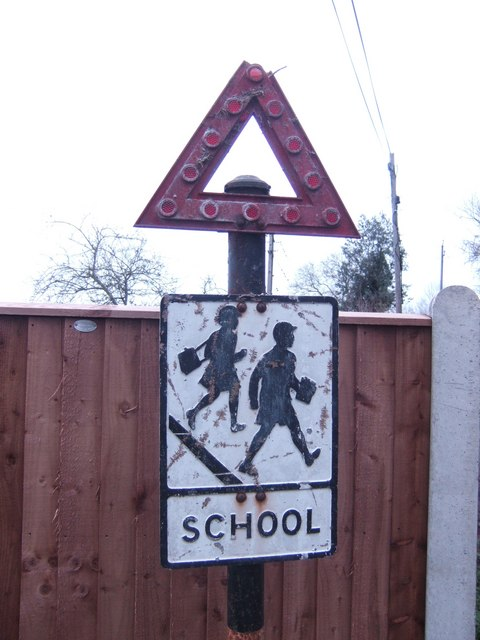
Pre-standardization British School Zone with metal-cutout generic Warning symbol embellished with red glass reflector-spheres

Some of the first roadside signs—ancient milestones—merely gave distance measures. Hazard warnings were rare though occasional specimens appeared, such as the specific warning about horse-drawn vehicles backing up which was carved in stone in Lisbon's Alfama neighborhood in 1686. The early signs did not have high-contrast lettering and their messages might have been easily overlooked. Signs were written in the local language (example); symbolic signs, though long used on certain tradesmen's signs (like the pawnbrokers' tri-ball symbol) were to be used for traffic only much later in history.

Complex signage systems emerged with the appearance of motorcars. In 1908 the automobile association in West London erected some warning signs. In 1909, nine European governments agreed on the use of four pictorial symbols, indicating bump, curve, intersection, and railroad crossing. The intensive work on international road signs that took place between 1926 and 1949 eventually led to the development of the European road sign system.

As the 20th century progressed, and traffic volume and vehicle speeds increased, so did the importance of road sign visibility. Earlier flat-painted signs gave way to signs with embossed letters, which in turn gave way to button copy signs— round retroreflective "buttons" helped to achieve greater night visibility. Flat metal signs reappeared in the 1980s with the widespread use of surfaces covered with retroflective sheeting materials like Scotchlite.

In Europe, 1968 Vienna Convention on Road Signs and Signals (which became effective in 1978) tried, among other things, to standardize important signs. After the fall of the Iron Curtain and greater ease of country-to-country driving in the EU, European countries moved toward lessening the regional differences in warning signs.

In modern regulations, U.S. warning signs are classified as Series W signs, starting with the W1 Series (curves and turns) and ending with the W26 Series (used exclusively for “Watch for Stopped Traffic”). Some U.S. warning signs are without category while others like the warning stripes at tunnel portals or plain red End of Roadway signs are classified as Object Markers (OM Series). In the U.S., Stop and speed limit signs fall under the R Series (Regulatory). Modern U.S. signs are widely standardized; unless they are antique holdovers from an earlier era, oddities like a yellow Stop sign or a red Slippery When Wet sign would typically appear only on private property—perhaps at a hospital campus or in a shopping mall parking lot.

Street sign theft by pranksters, souvenir hunters, and scrappers has become problematic: removal of warning signs costs municipalities money to replace lost signs, and can contribute to traffic collisions. Some authorities affix theft-deterrence stickers to the back sides of signs. Some jurisdictions have criminalized unauthorized possession of road signs or have outlawed their resale to scrap metal dealers. In some cases, thieves whose sign-removal lead to road fatalities have been charged with manslaughter. Artistically inclined vandals sometimes paint additional details onto warning signs: a beer bottle, a handgun, or a boom box added to the outstretched hand of the Pedestrian Crossing person, for example.

== Modern traffic warning sign shapes and colors ==
Shape and colors of road warning sign used: Uses Uses, previously used Uses Uses, previously used Uses a combination of Uses Uses No information

Warning signs can indicate any potential hazard, obstacle or condition requiring special attention. Some of the most common warning signs are the following.

=== General caution ===
Yellow diamond with black symbol

White background red triangle with black symbol

Amber background red triangle with black symbol

General warning signs are used in instances in which the particular hazard, obstacle or condition is not covered by a standard sign. In Europe, they usually comprise an exclamation mark on the standard triangular sign (Unicode U+26A0 ⚠ WARNING SIGN) with an auxiliary sign below in the local language identifying the hazard, obstacle or condition. In Sweden, the general warning sign has only a vertical line instead of exclamation mark; this model was used also in many other European countries until the 1990s. In the United States and other countries using diamond-shaped signs, the explanatory language is often written directly on the diamond-shaped sign, although it may contain only a general warning such as "Caution", and pictograms may also be used.

=== Obstacles ===
Warning signs can be placed in advance of, next to or on a specific obstacle. Obstacles such as railway level crossings may have several warning signs beforehand, while bridge ramparts typically have reflective signs placed directly on them on either side. These signs can be specific to the shape requirements of the obstacle, for example, bridge rampart signs are often tall and skinny so as not to intrude into the lane.

=== Curves and corners ===
Vienna Convention dangerous bends sign (diamond-shaped)

New Zealand double sharp curve to the left sign

These signs indicate that dangerous or unexpected bends in the road are ahead. Signs typically indicate whether the curves are to the right or to the left, the angle of the curve and whether it is one curve or a series of curves.

==== Chevrons and arrows ====
Philippines curve chevron

Chevron-shaped symbols or arrows on rectangular signs may be placed at the actual location of the bend or curve to further mark the location of the curve and to assist in the negotiation of the curve. They may also be used to indicate "merge" with other traffic, as for an on-ramp of a limited-access highway.

=== Steep hills ===
10% down grade sign (white triangle)

Truck drivers will need to pay attention to "Steep grade" warnings (or "Down grade, use lower gear"), sometimes posted with the percent grade (e.g., 12%). Steep hills may also feature "Runaway truck escape" or "Emergency stop" areas with corresponding signs. The UK has a sign warning of "Adverse camber" on a curve.

=== Lane starts and ends ===
Vienna Convention carriageway narrows sign (yellow diamond)

These signs indicate when a multilane highway is being narrowed, when a passing lane is ending, or where the road is widening or a passing lane starting. Another type of sign is used to indicate central "two-way" left turning lane in center of roadway. Warning signs may also warn of "Highway ends", where the road changes class or type.

=== Merge to stay with through traffic ===
Vienna Convention merging traffic sign (yellow diamond)

In the United States and Canada, there is special signage for lanes that are about to exit, so that drivers who wish to remain on the main road have adequate time to merge. Such lanes are sometimes indicated by special striping ("alligator stripes") and the sign, "Through Traffic Merge Left" (or right). On freeways, the green directions sign for the exit ramp may have the additional notation, "Exit Only", and should have black letters on a yellow background for emphasis.

=== Bridges ===
Vienna Convention drawbridge ahead sign (white triangle)

New Zealand narrow bridge ahead sign

These signs are used where traffic may be constricted to a narrow bridge, or where the bridge may have a movable span closed to vehicles while boats pass (e.g., drawbridge). They may also be used for underpass to indicate low overhead clearance.

=== Tunnels ===
United States (California)

These signs are used to indicate tunnels, where lights are usually required, and a general change in the light level. May also indicate low ceiling clearance. Truck drivers should also watch for prohibited cargo signs (e.g., propane) upon approach to tunnels.

=== Road conditions ===
Vienna Convention slippery road because ice or snow (white triangle)

New Zealand bump sign

Warns road users of severe road conditions ("Icy road", "Bump", etc). Also "Loose gravel", "Soft shoulder", "Speed hump", and "Watch for ice".

=== Falling rocks ===
Vienna Convention falling rocks sign (white triangle)

These signs may be used to indicate the hazards of fallen or falling rocks on the road ahead. They are usually pictographs, but may also include wording, such as "falling rocks". In Italy the words may be "caduta sassi" or "caduta massi"; in France "chute de pierres"; in Mexico "derrumbes".

=== Pedestrian crossings ===
Vienna Convention pedestrian crossing sign (white triangle)

These signs are used to warn drivers of people walking in the street. They may also be used to warn of children playing, playgrounds, bicycle area, deaf child, blind pedestrians, and thickly settled zones where pedestrians may enter the road.

In California, United States near the Mexican border, there were warning signs showing a running family. This was to warn motorists to look out for illegal immigrants who try to escape authorities by running through freeway traffic. The symbol was created by California Department of Transportation employee John Hood in the late 1980s.

=== Schools ===
Vienna Convention school crossing ahead (yellow diamond, LHT version)

These signs mark school zones (in which lower speed limits may be in place), student crossings, crossing guards or signals ahead. In the U.S. and Canada, pentagon-shaped signs are used in place of the usual diamond-shaped signs. The shape of the U.S. school zone resembles a one-room schoolhouse and is the only U.S. sign shaped this way. Some Canadian provinces use an identical sign.

=== Bicycles ===
Vienna Convention bicycle crossing ahead (white triangle)

Bicycle crossing signs warn that bicycles will cross at their location.

=== Animals crossing the roadway ===
Vienna Convention wild animal crossing (yellow diamond, LHT version)

New Zealand cows ahead sign

New Zealand sheep ahead sign

U.S. sheep area sign

These signs warn of animals that may stray onto the road. They can be either wild (as with deer or moose) or farm animals (as with cows or ducks). In the United States, a "share the road" plaque is sometimes placed below these warning signs when used in this manner.

=== Unusual vehicles in roadway ===
United Kingdom: military vehicles crossing.

New Zealand: fire trucks.

These signs are found where road users can encounter slow, large or non-typical vehicles such as forklifts, handcarts and military vehicles. They are more common around quarries, airports, industrial zones, military installations and rural areas.

=== Road work or construction ===
New Zealand road work sign

These signs are often temporary in nature and used to indicate road work (construction), poor roads, or temporary conditions ahead on the road including flagmen, uneven pavement, etc. (Note that some "high water" signs are posted to alert drivers of a flood-prone area and do not actually mean that there is a flooded section of road ahead.) In France, Italy, Spain, Norway etc., warning (and speed limit) signs connected with road work have a yellow background in place of the usual white background on signs. In North America and Ireland, signs connected with road work have an orange background.

=== Traffic signals ===
Vienna Convention traffic signal ahead (white triangle)

These warning signs indicate that traffic lights are ahead, and are often used when it is difficult to see that a traffic light may already be showing red, to warn a driver to prepare to slow down. They may be supplemented with flashing light or lighted sign when light is red or turning red. Some countries also have signs warning of signals for ramp meters, fire stations, and airfields.

=== Intersections ===
Vienna Convention intersection sign (diamond-shaped)

New Zealand intersection with priority sign

These signs warn of road crossings at crossroads, T-intersections, roundabouts, or Y-intersections. They may also indicate "hidden driveway" intersecting the road ahead. (Compare with bridges, overpasses, viaducts).

=== Warning signs for regulatory signs ===
Vienna Convention stop ahead sign (white triangle)

New Zealand stop ahead sign

New Zealand give way ahead sign

Like for traffic signals, some "stop" or "yield" signs may require additional warning or reminder, especially in dense areas or where the sign has been added recently.

=== Oncoming traffic ===
Vienna Convention two-way traffic sign (white triangle)

These signs may be used to warn people of oncoming traffic; shown when a motorway becomes a dual carriageway or a normal road without a central reservation or median.

=== Level crossing (railway crossing) ===
Vienna Convention protected level crossing sign (yellow diamond)

These signs are used to warn of level crossings ahead. In most countries, a red triangle warning sign is used, with various pictograms for unguarded crossings, crossings with manual gates, and automatic level crossings. In most of Europe, an old-style gate is used for a crossing with gates, and a steam locomotive for a crossing without gates. Germany uses an electric train. Similar pictograms are also used in Ireland, albeit on an amber diamond sign. In the United States the warning of all types of railway crossings is made using a circular yellow sign. The actual crossing is also marked with crossed "railroad crossing" crossbuck signs (stop, look, listen) and possibly lights, bells, and barriers.

=== Low flying aircraft ===
Vienna Convention low flying aircraft (White triangle)

A warning sign with the image of an aircraft in the middle of it indicates an airport or airfield, where drivers should be prepared for low-flying aircraft.

=== Crosswinds or side winds ===
Vienna Convention side winds sign (amber triangle)

Flying socks, as indicated in Poland by a windsock on red triangle or yellow diamond signs, indicate locations where a strong side wind may cause the trajectory of the moving vehicle to change drastically, perhaps even "flying" across lanes, causing an accident.

=== Roads with one entry point ===
Canada: pictorial no exit sign

Roadways that only have one entry/exit point - "dead end", "not a through street" or "no outlet".

=== End of roadway ===
U.S. (New York City): roadway ends.

Signs indicating the end point of a roadway.

=== Fire stations ===
Texas emergency vehicles sign

These signs warn of approach to where firefighters may be entering the road with fire engines or other emergency apparatus, where other drivers will have to stop and wait until they pass.

== Traffic warning signs with lights ==
Some warning signs have flashing lights to alert drivers of conditions ahead or remind drivers to slow down. In Britain, they are called warning lights. Flashing lights can be dangerous for people with certain forms of epilepsy and/or sensory processing disorder.

Attached lights

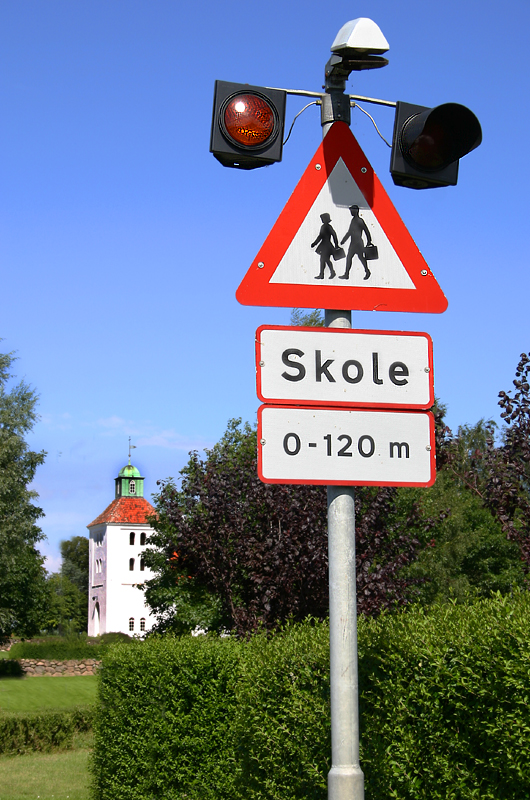
School zone traffic warning sign in Denmark

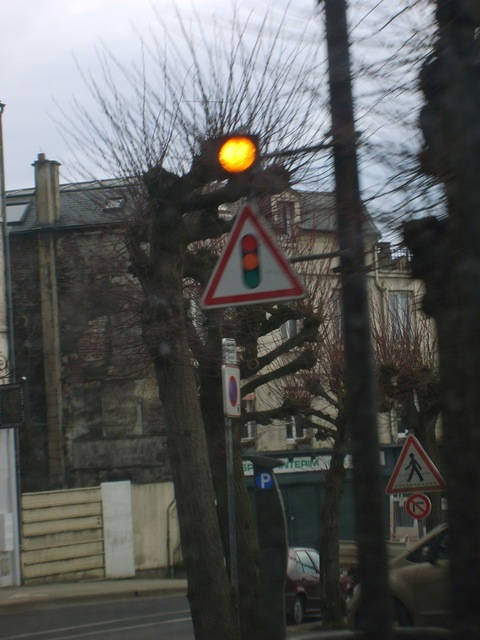
A traffic signal ahead sign in France (The light flashes to indicate a red light ahead.)

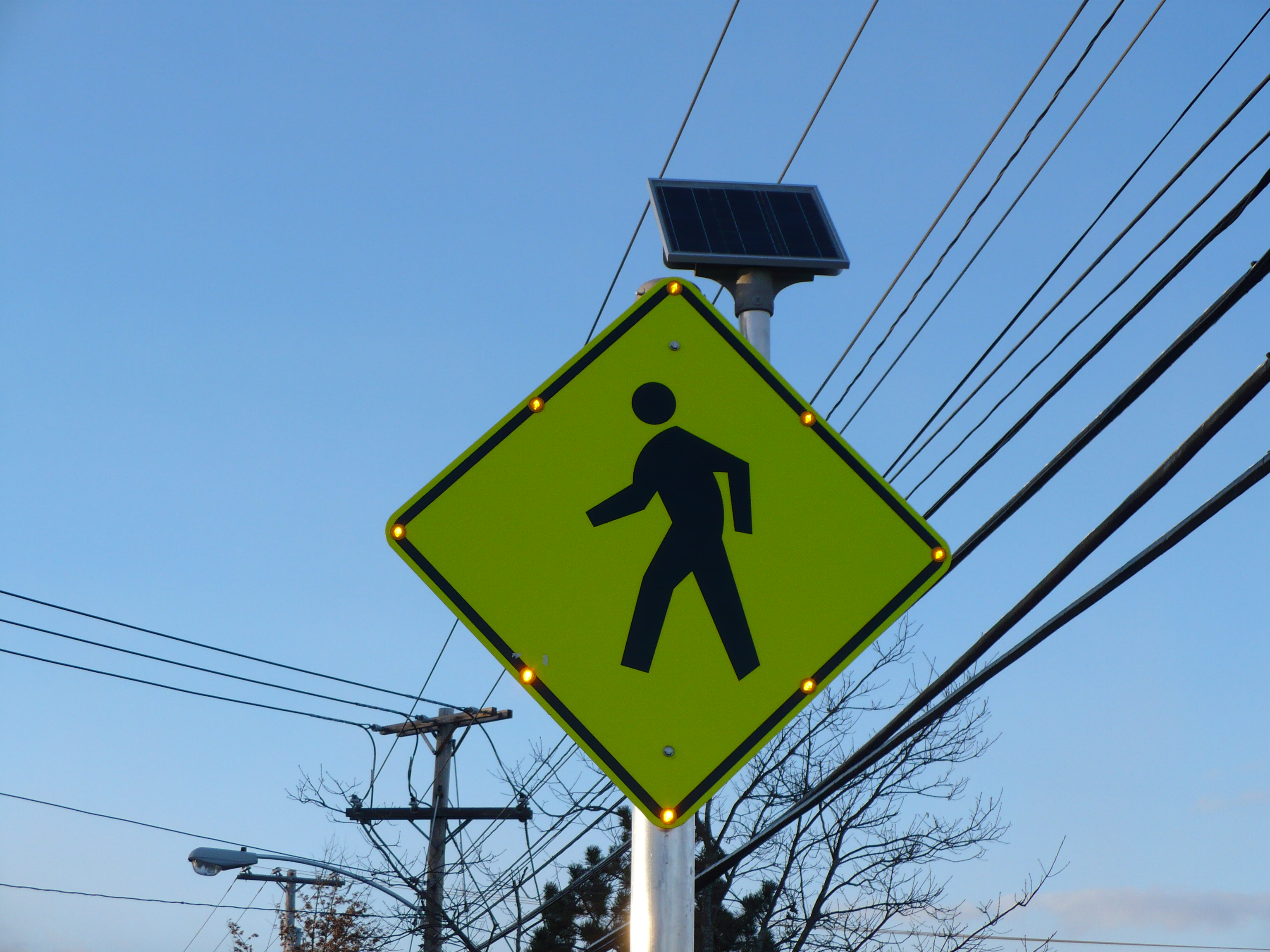
A pedestrian crossing sign in the United States with solar-powered lit outline

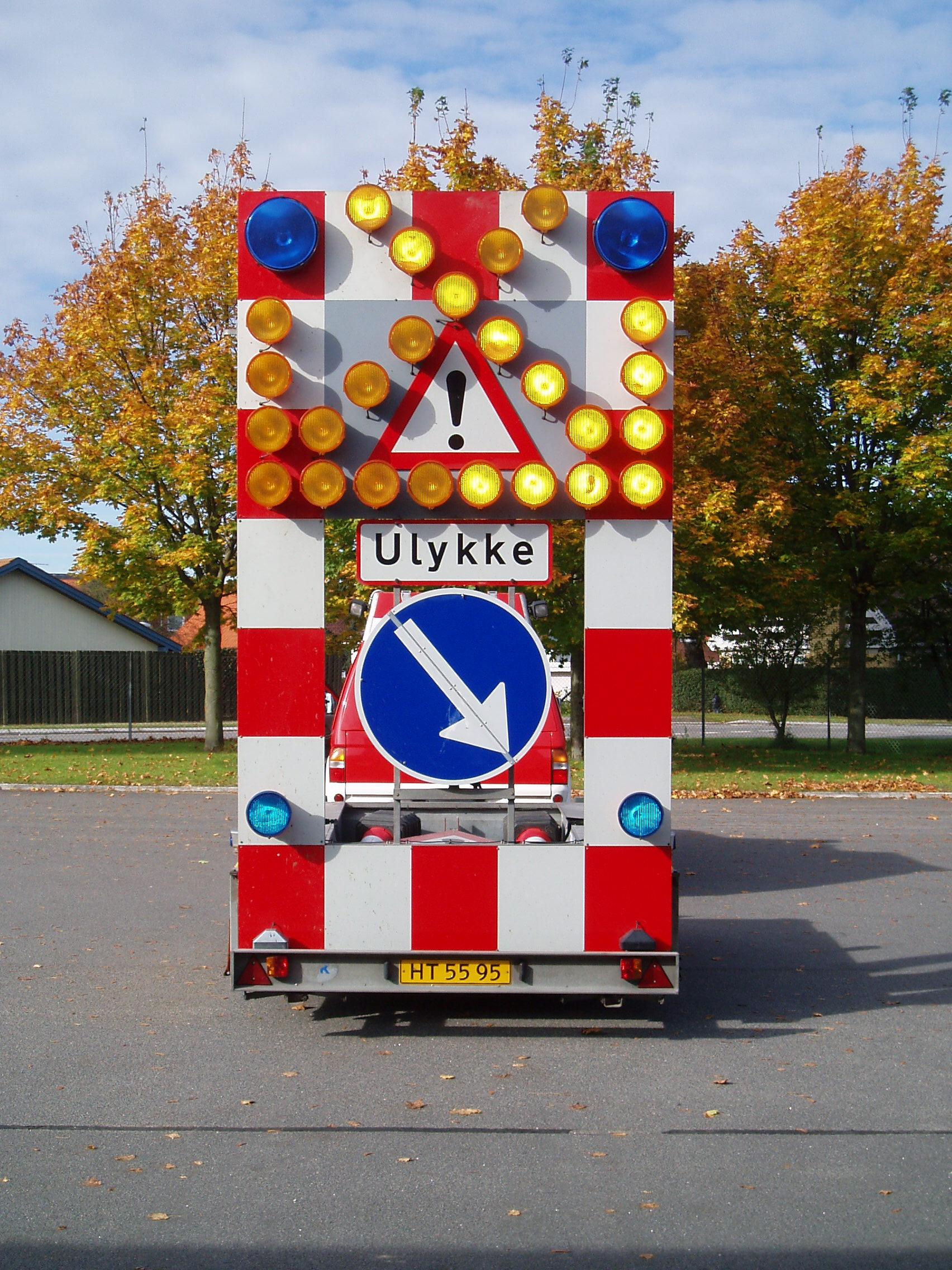
A portable multipurpose traffic warning array in Denmark, displaying Ulykke ("accident") and "keep right"

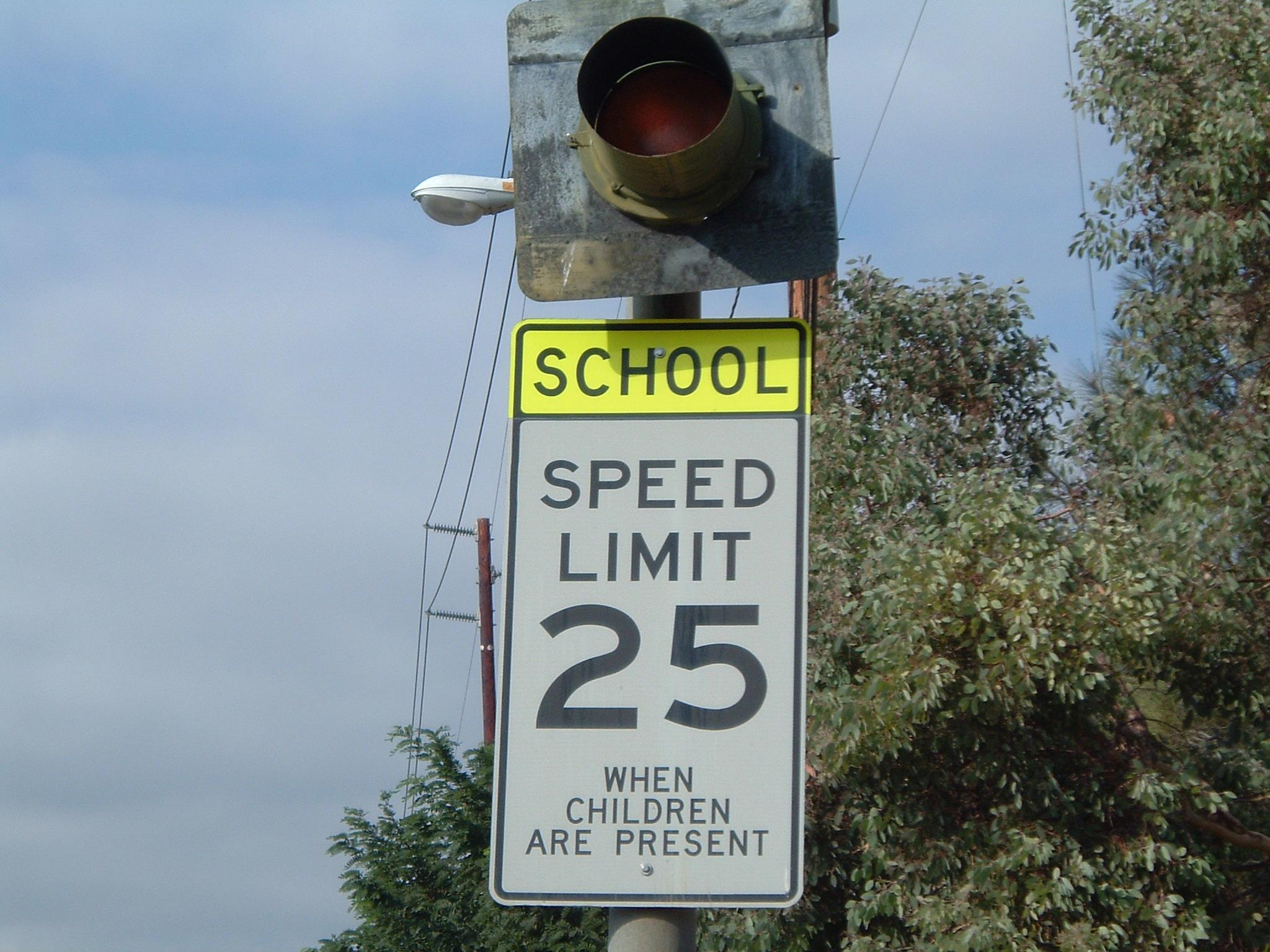
A school zone sign in the United States. When the light flashes, the set speed limit (in this case, 25 mph (40 km/h)) is active.

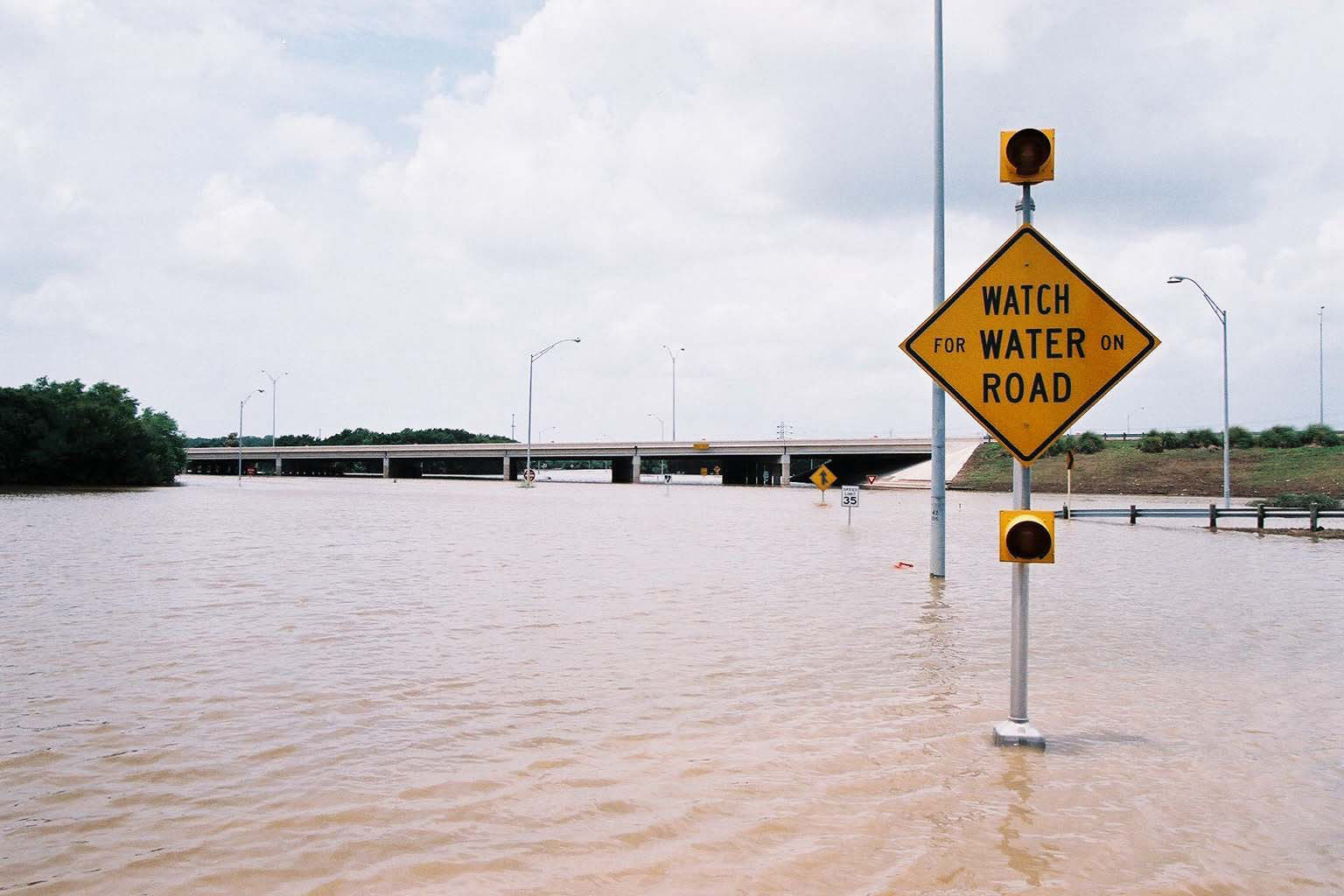
A "Watch for Water on Road" sign in the United States

== See also ==
- Traffic sign
- Hazard symbol
- Comparison of European road signs
- Comparison of traffic signs in English-speaking countries
- Direction, position, or indication sign - Traffic signs that indicate directions, routes.
- Glossary of road transport terms
- Mandatory sign - Traffic signs that inform of required actions.
- One-way traffic
- Prohibitory sign - Traffic signs that inform of prohibited actions.
- Regulatory sign - Traffic signs that inform of traffic regulations.
- Road signs in Canada
- Road signs in the United States
- Variable-message sign
