= Prohibitory traffic sign =

Signs that prohibit certain actions or types of traffic

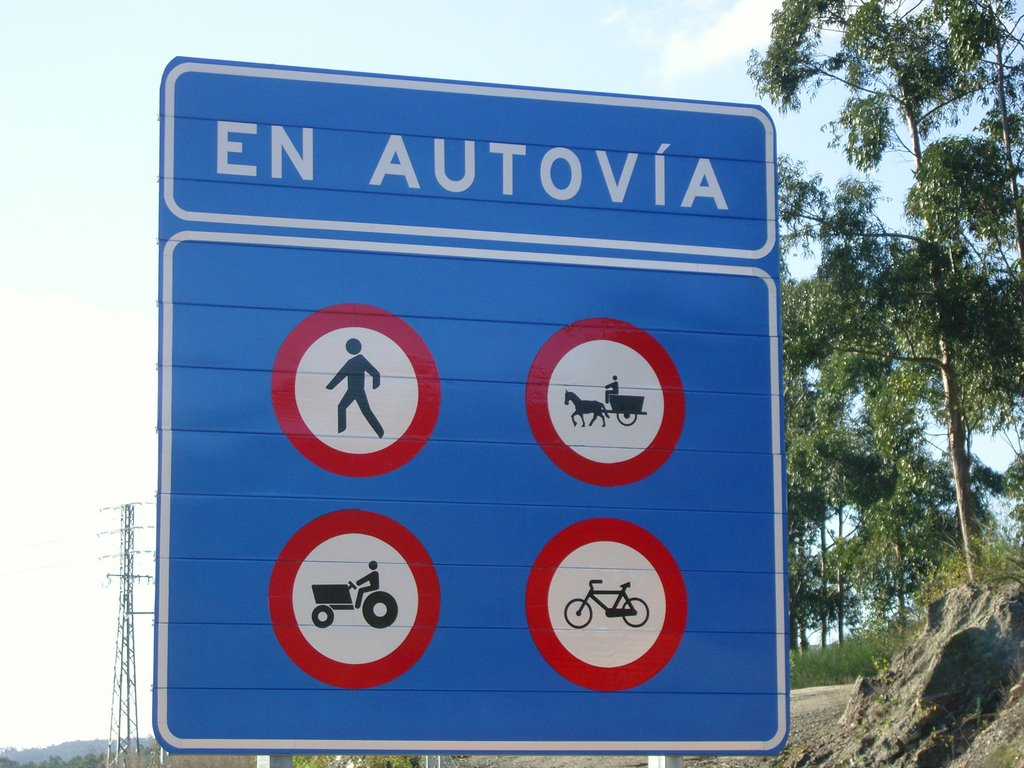
Traffic prohibitions at the entrance to an autovía

Prohibitory traffic signs are traffic signs used to prohibit certain types of manoeuvres or some types of traffic.

== Modern prohibitory traffic signs ==
=== No entry ===
No admittance to unauthorised personnel, usually shown as a red circle with a white rectangle shape across its face. It is often used for one-way traffic.

Australia, Guyana

Belgium

Bosnia and Herzegovina, Croatia

Southern African Development Community (SADC)

Bulgaria

Canada

China

Costa Rica

Denmark

Finland

France

Germany

Greece

Hong Kong

Hungary

Iceland

India

Indonesia

Iran

Ireland

Japan

Luxembourg

Moldova

Mongolia

New Zealand

North Macedonia

Norway

Oman

Peru

Philippines

Poland

Romania

Russia, Armenia, Azerbaijan, Belarus, Georgia, Kazakhstan, Lithuania

Slovenia

Spain

Sweden

Thailand

Ukraine

United Kingdom and other countries

United States

South Korea

Albania, Italy, Malta, Sierra Leone

Estonia

==== Wrong way ====
These signs denote that the road is only for traffic coming in the opposite direction. Used at intersections to roads with one-way traffic or ramps.

Australia

Austria

Canada

Costa Rica

Croatia

Ireland

Netherlands

Norway

Poland

Thailand

United States

New Zealand

==== Road closed ====
No admittance for vehicles. It is used on closed roads.

Canada

China

Croatia

Most European countries

Germany

Hong Kong

Iceland

Japan (Road closed to all)

Japan (Road closed to vehicles)

Luxembourg

Macau

Moldova

New Zealand

North Macedonia

Oman

Romania

Russia, Kazakhstan, Lithuania

Slovenia

Spain

Sweden

United States

Ukraine

South Africa, Tanzania

==== No straight ahead ====
Traffic is not permitted to continue straight, and must usually turn. These may occur at an intersection with incoming one-way traffic.

China

Ireland

Mexico

United States

Canada

India

Thailand

Chile

Costa Rica

Brazil

South Korea

=== No motor vehicles ===
Motor vehicles are not permitted in this region.

Austria

Belgium

China

Croatia

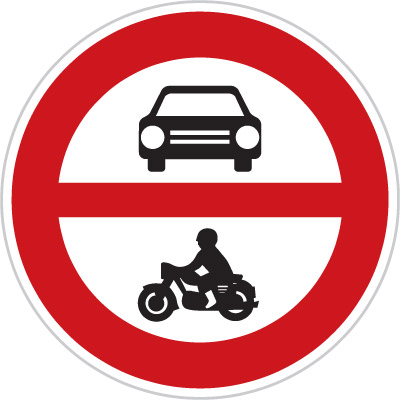
Czech Republic

France

Germany

Greece

Hong Kong

Hungary

Iceland

India

Indonesia

Italy

Latvia

Luxembourg

Mexico

Netherlands

North Macedonia

Norway

Oman

Poland

Romania

Russia

Serbia

Slovenia

Spain

Sweden

Turkey

United Kingdom

United States

Japan

Iran

Jamaica

Jamaica

Moldova

Nepal

SADC

Finland

=== No motorcycles ===
Motorcycles are not permitted in the designated area.

Austria

Belgium

China

Croatia

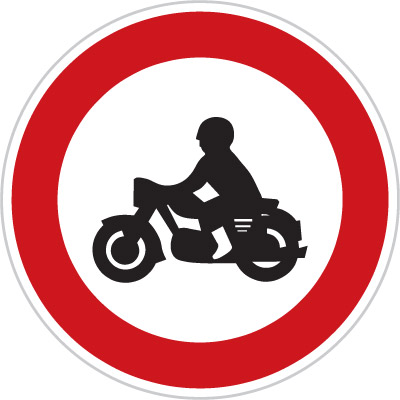
Czechia

France

Germany

Greece

Hong Kong

Hungary

Iceland

Indonesia

Italy

Latvia

Luxembourg

Mexico

Netherlands

North Macedonia

Norway

Oman

Poland

Romania

Russia

Slovenia

Spain

Sweden

Turkey

United Kingdom

United States

Iran

Japan

Jamaica

Moldova

SADC

South Korea

Finland

=== No heavy goods vehicles ===
Heavy goods vehicles are not allowed.

Armenia

Australia

Austria

Belgium

Bulgaria

Canada

Canada (Québec)

China

Croatia

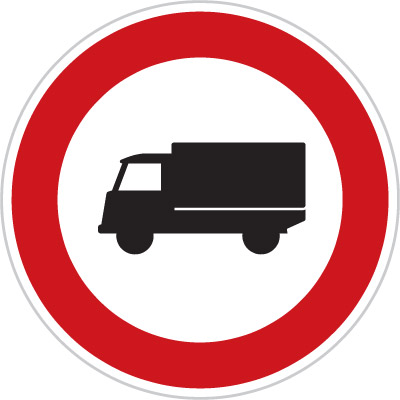
Czech Republic

Estonia

France

Germany

Greece

Hungary

Iceland

India

Indonesia

Italy

Japan

Latvia

Luxembourg

Mexico

Moldova

Netherlands

New Zealand

North Macedonia

Norway

Oman

Philippines

Poland

Romania

Slovakia

Slovenia

Spain

Sweden

United Kingdom

United States

Russia

South Korea

SADC

Uganda

Ukraine

Jamaica

Finland

=== No buses ===
Buses are not permitted.

Australia

Austria

Belgium

China

Croatia

Estonia

France

Germany

Greece

Hungary

Iceland

India

Italy

Japan

Netherlands

North Macedonia

Oman

Poland

Portugal

Romania

Russia

Slovakia

Slovenia

South Korea

Switzerland, Liechtenstein

Turkey

United Kingdom

Thailand

Finland

=== No pedestrians ===
Pedestrians are not allowed on the road, but may use a footpath instead.

Australia

Austria

Belgium

Bulgaria

Canada

China

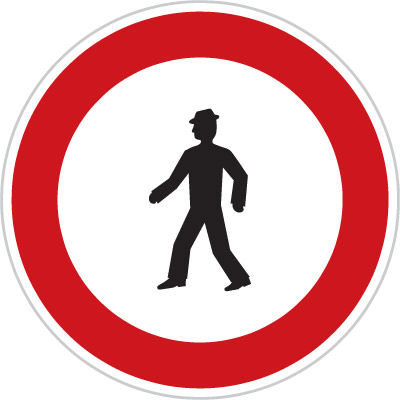
Czechia

Estonia

France

Germany

Greece

Hungary

Iceland

India

Italy

Japan (Road closed to pedestrians)

Japan (No jaywalking)

Luxembourg

Mexico

Netherlands

North Macedonia

Norway

Oman

Philippines

Philippines (use overpass)

Philippines (use pedestrian crossing)

Poland

Portugal

Romania

Russia, Armenia, Azerbaijan, Belarus, Georgia, Kazakhstan, Mongolia

Slovakia

Slovenia

Spain

Sweden

United Kingdom

Ukraine

United States

Kyrgyzstan

New Zealand

Iran

Croatia

Lithuania

SADC

Chile

Nepal

Jamaica

Finland

Ireland

Moldova

=== No bicycles ===
Austria

China

Iceland

Indonesia

Luxembourg

Mexico

Netherlands

North Macedonia

Oman

Romania

Slovenia

Spain

United Kingdom

Russia

New Zealand

Ukraine

Japan (Road Closed to Bicycles and Specified Small Motorized Bicycles)

Australia

Moldova

SADC

Germany

Hungary

Poland

Croatia

Jamaica

Greece

Iran

Finland

=== No pedestrians or bicycles ===
Pedestrians and bicycles are not permitted, but may be allowed on a footpath.

Canada

Germany (unofficial)

Hong Kong

Norway

United States

United States (also no motor-driven cycles are allowed)

SADC

Australia

Finland

=== No right, left, or U-turn ===
Either for all vehicles or with some exceptions (emergency vehicles, buses). These are usually to speed up traffic through an intersection or due to street cars or other rights of way or if the intersecting road is one-way. Indicated near-universally by an arrow making the prohibited turn overlaid with a red circle with an angular line crossing it.

==== No right turn signs ====
Australia

SADC

China

France

Iceland

Indonesia

Luxembourg

Mexico

New Zealand

North Macedonia

Norway

Oman

Philippines

Poland

Romania

Saudi Arabia

Slovenia

Spain

Sweden

United Kingdom

India

United States, Canada

Russia

Ukraine

Ireland

Moldova

South Korea

Croatia

Thailand

Iran

Finland

==== No left turn signs ====
Australia

SADC

China

France

Iceland

Indonesia

Luxembourg

Mexico

New Zealand

North Macedonia

Norway

Oman

Philippines

Poland

Romania

Slovenia

Spain

Sweden

United Kingdom

India

United States, Canada

Russia

Ukraine

Ireland

Moldova

South Korea

Croatia

Thailand

Iran

Finland

==== No turn signs ====
Andorra

Canada

China

United States

==== No U-turn signs ====
Australia

SADC

China

France

Hong Kong

Iceland

India

Indonesia

Ireland

Luxembourg

Mexico

Netherlands

New Zealand

North Macedonia

Norway

Oman

Philippines

Poland

Romania

Saudi Arabia

Slovenia

Spain

Sweden

United Kingdom

United States

Caltrans (Left turn on green arrow)

Russia

Ukraine

Japan

Germany

Denmark

Moldova

South Korea

Croatia

Canada

British Virgin Islands

Thailand

Thailand

Iran

Finland

==== No left or U-turn signs ====
United States

Thailand

Ecuador

==== No right or U-turn signs ====
India (rarely used)

Indonesia

Thailand

==== Other turn prohibition signs ====
Canada: No right turn and straight ahead

Canada: No left turn and straight ahead

China: No right turn and straight ahead

China: No left turn and straight ahead

=== No overtaking ===
Overtaking is prohibited either for all vehicles or for certain kinds of vehicles only (e.g. lorries, motorcycles). In the USA, this is usually phrased as "no passing zone" and indicated by a rectangular, black-on-white sign on the right side of the road that says "DO NOT PASS", and/or by a solid yellow line painted on the roadway marking the left limit of traffic (centerline), and sometimes supplemented by a yellow (no passing zone) sign on the opposite side of the road (where it can be seen by a driver who is attempting to pass). Conversely, where the passing restriction is lifted, a rectangular, black-on-white sign that says "PASS WITH CARE" is placed on the right side of the road, and/or the yellow centerline changes from solid to broken (indicating that passing is allowed in that direction).

==== No overtaking or passing signs ====
Canada

China

Egypt

Indonesia

India

Luxembourg

Luxembourg

Mexico

North Macedonia

North Macedonia

Norway, typical for most parts of Europe

Norway, typical for most parts of Europe

Hungary

Hungary

Germany

Germany

Poland

Poland

Croatia

Croatia

Philippines

Sweden

Sweden

Thailand

United Kingdom (excl. Gibraltar)

United States

Russia

Russia

Ireland

Japan

Ukraine

Ukraine

Iran

Iran

South Korea

SADC

SADC

Czechia

Czechia

France

France

Slovenia

Slovenia

Spain

Spain

Romania

Romania

Oman

Oman

Iceland

Iceland

Finland

Finland

==== overtaking permission signs ====
Canada

China

Indonesia

Luxembourg

Luxembourg

North Macedonia

North Macedonia

Norway

Norway

Hungary

Hungary

Germany

Germany

Poland

Poland

Croatia

Croatia

Sweden

Sweden

Russia

Russia

Ukraine

Ukraine

Tanzania

Tanzania

United States

France

France

Iran

Iran

Slovenia

Slovenia

Spain

Spain

Romania

Oman

Iceland

Iceland

Finland

Finland

=== Limits ===
==== Speed limits ====
Used to indicate a maximum permissible speed. Speed limits are posted in kilometres per hour in most countries; however, the United Kingdom and United States use miles per hour. Motorists are expected to be aware of this, as the majority of speed limit signs display only a number and no specific units, although some countries' signs do display the unit as well. In Canada, the first sign in a sequence will display km/h and subsequent signs often will omit the unit.

===== Speed limit signs =====
Australia

Canada

China (Mainland)

Germany, typical for most parts of Europe

France

Iceland

Indonesia

Ireland

Luxembourg

Mexico

New Zealand

North Macedonia

Norway

Oman

Philippines

Romania

Samoa

Slovenia

Spain

Sweden

United Kingdom

United States

Lithuania

Russia

Ukraine

Japan

India

Hungary

Iran

Belarus

Moldova

SADC

Denmark

Croatia

Finland

===== End of speed limit =====
Used to denote that a previously posted speed limit is no longer in effect. Statutory state, local, or national speed limits usually govern speed after this point, unless another limit is signposted.

China (Mainland)

Germany, typical for most parts of Europe

Iceland

Indonesia

Luxembourg

New Zealand

North Macedonia

Oman

Philippines

Romania

Slovenia

Spain

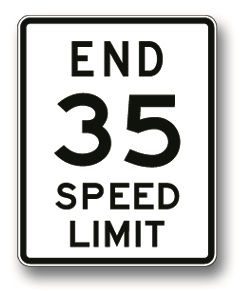
United States

Poland

Hungary

Lithuania

Japan

Russia

Ukraine

Sweden

Russia

Moldova

France

Denmark

Croatia

Finland

==== Weight limits ====
Used to denote maximum weight for bridges.

China

Egypt

Iceland

Iceland

Indonesia

Italy

Luxembourg

Mexico

Netherlands

North Macedonia

Norway

Oman

Philippines

Poland

Romania

Romania

Saudi Arabia

Slovenia

Slovenia

Spain

Spain

Sweden

Japan

India

Russia

Ukraine

Moldova

Iran

Georgia

Armenia

SADC

Croatia

Finland

Finland

==== Width limits ====
Used to denote maximum width on narrow roadways.

China

Iceland

Indonesia

Italy

Luxembourg

Mexico

Netherlands

North Macedonia

Norway

Oman

Philippines

Poland

Romania

Saudi Arabia

Slovenia

Spain

Sweden

United Kingdom

Japan

India

Russia

Ukraine

Iran

Moldova

Georgia

Armenia

SADC

Croatia

United States

Finland

Denmark

==== Height limits ====
Used to denote height limit on bridges and underpasses.

China

Iceland

Indonesia

Italy

Luxembourg

Mexico

Netherlands

North Macedonia

Norway

Oman

Philippines

Poland

Romania

Saudi Arabia

Slovenia

Spain

Sweden

United Kingdom

United States

Japan

India

Russia

Ukraine

Iran

Moldova

Georgia

Armenia

SADC

Croatia

Finland

Denmark

==== Length limits ====
Used to denote maximum length.

Iceland

Indonesia

Italy

Luxembourg

Netherlands

North Macedonia

Norway

Oman

Philippines

Poland

Romania

Saudi Arabia

Slovenia

Spain

Sweden

United Kingdom

India

Russia

Ukraine

Moldova

Georgia

Armenia

Croatia

Finland

=== No horns ===
Sounding vehicle horns is not allowed for vehicles in some areas, most commonly in school zones, villages, or near hospitals or churches.

Austria

Bulgaria

China

Estonia

France

India

Indonesia

Italy

Latvia

Luxembourg

Mexico

North Macedonia

Oman

Philippines

Poland

Romania

Russia

Slovenia

Spain

Ukraine

Croatia

Iran

=== No parking ===
This sign is used where parking is prohibited. Usually shown as a red diagonal bar inside a blue circle with a red ring in Europe and parts of Asia, and a 'P' in a red circle with a cross through in North and South America, elsewhere in Asia, Australia, Africa and Ireland. The no parking sign is a part of controlled parking zone sign, which is obsolete in Belgrade from 1997.

Australia

SADC

Canada

Caltrans: No parking at Any Time (R28)

China

France

Iceland

Indonesia

Luxembourg

Mexico

New Zealand

North Macedonia

Norway

Oman

Philippines

Romania

Slovenia

Spain

United Kingdom

Poland

Hungary

United States

Japan

India

Russia

Ukraine

Germany

United States

Iran

Moldova

Croatia

Finland

=== No stopping ===
This sign is used where parking and stopping is prohibited. Usually shown as a red cross inside a blue circle with a red ring in Europe and parts of Asia, and a 'E' in a red circle with a X through in South America.

Australia

SADC

Caltrans: No stopping at Any Time

Caltrans: No stopping at Any Time (Tow-away zone)

Canada

China

Czech Republic

France

Iceland

Indonesia

Luxembourg

Mexico

New Zealand

Poland

Hungary

North Macedonia

Norway

Oman

Philippines

Romania

Slovenia

Spain

United Kingdom

Japan

India

Russia

Ukraine

Germany

Iran

Moldova

Croatia

Finland

=== Stop at customs ===
Stop at customs that are used at border crossings, toll roads or police.

Italy

Norway

Germany

Lithuania

Poland

Slovakia

Hungary

Iceland

Luxembourg

Mexico

North Macedonia

Oman

Romania

Slovenia

Spain

Sweden

Thailand

Russia

Croatia

Denmark

Iran

Finland

=== End of restrictions ===
These are the signs that end restrictions.

Philippines

Latvia, Bulgaria

Russia, Lithuania

Poland

India

Hungary

Austria

Belgium

Netherlands

Germany and some other countries

Ukraine

Croatia

Slovenia

Spain

Iceland

Luxembourg

Romania

North Macedonia

Oman

=== Other ===
China: No small passenger vehicles

Czech Republic: No transit

United Kingdom: No articulated vehicles

Netherlands: No riders, cattle, wagons, motor vehicles unable to exceed 25 km/h, microcars, bicycles, mopeds or invalid carriages

India: Bullock cart prohibited

India: Bullock cart and hand cart prohibited

India: Hand cart prohibited

India: Tongas (a two-wheeled cart drawn by a single horse) prohibited

Philippines: No waiting anytime

A kilometers per hour tab added to the bottom of some Canadian speed limit signs.

Mexico: No stopping for passenger vehicles

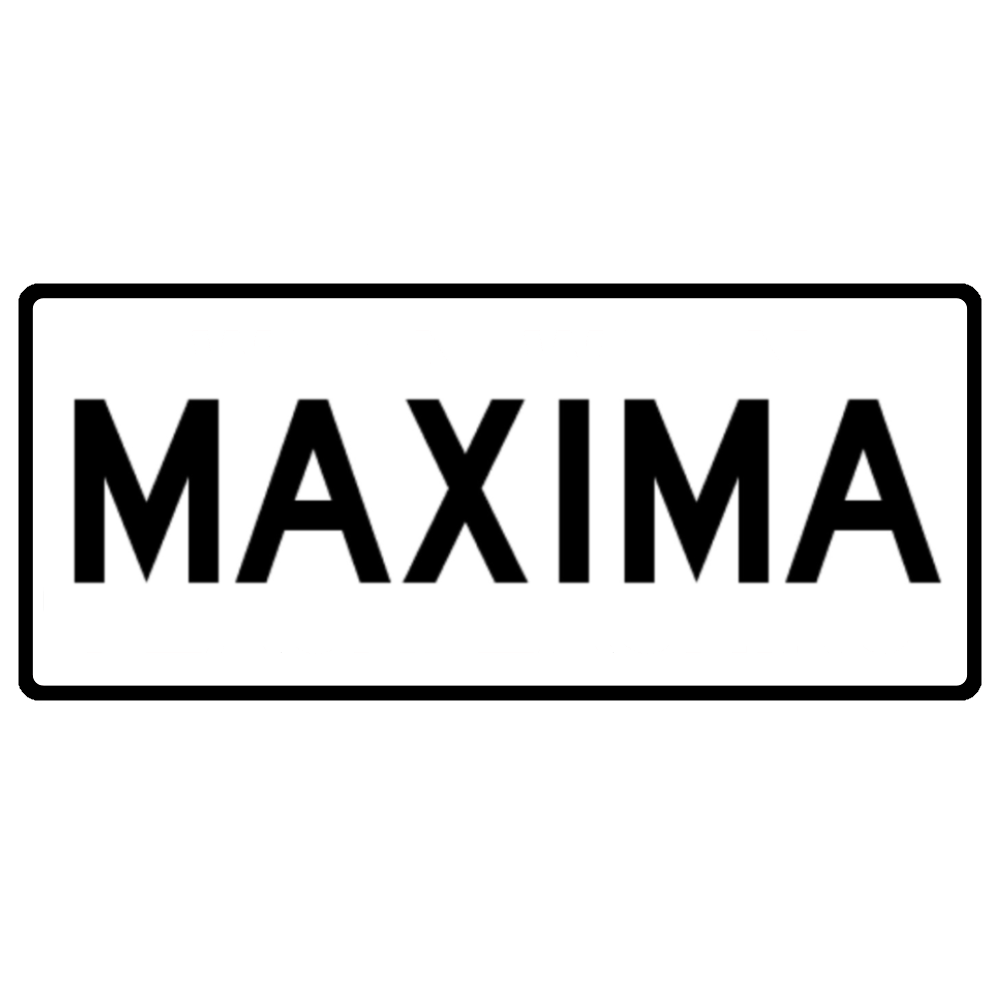
A maximum speed plaque added to the bottom of some Mexican speed limit signs.

Brazil: No shifting lanes from the right

Brazil: No shifting lanes from the left

Poland: End of no U-turn

Tajikistan: End of no buses

Russia: No personal mobility devices

Russia: Keep your distance

Finland: Tractors prohibited

Finland: Trailers prohibited

Finland: Snowmobiles prohibited

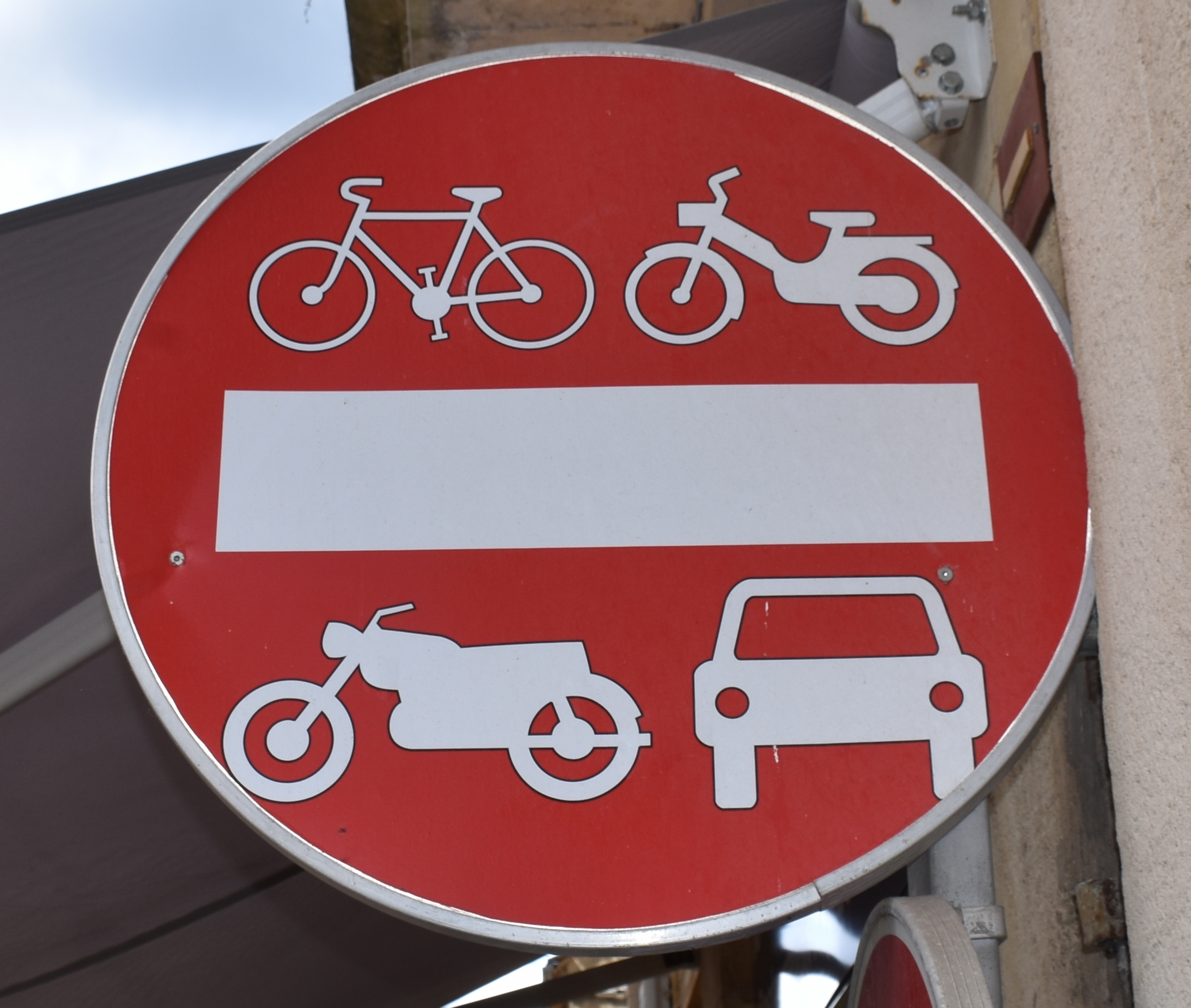
France: No entry for bicycles, motor vehicles including motorcycles

Slovenia: No motor and animal-drawn vehicles

Spain: No animal riders

Spain: No personal mobility devices

Spain: No personal mobility devices and bicycles

Iceland: No snowmobiles

Iceland: No mopeds

Iceland: No animal riders

Luxembourg: No animal-drawn vehicles

Luxembourg: No handcarts

Romania: No animal-drawn vehicles

Romania: No handcarts

Romania: No tractors

Romania: Speed limit per vehicle category

North Macedonia: No animal riders

North Macedonia: No handcarts

North Macedonia: No photographing

Oman: No trailers

Oman: No animal-drawn vehicles

Oman: No handcarts

Oman: No tractors

Russia: Tractors prohibited

Egypt: No texting while driving

Japan: No non-motorized vehicles except bicycles

Japan: No two-person motorbikes or mopeds

Ireland: Rural speed limit sign

== See also ==
- No symbol
- Warning sign
