= Speed limits in Thailand =

A speed limit sign as used in Thailand (also an international sign)

Speed limits in Thailand are a set of maximum speeds applicable on any road in Thailand. For small cars that weigh less than 1,200 kg (2,646 lb), the maximum limits within the built-up area and outside are 80 km/h (50 mph) and 90 km/h (56 mph) respectively. The exception applies to motorways, in which small cars can use up to 120 km/h (75 mph). Heavier cars, buses and trailer have more restrictive limits. Despite having the general maximum speed limits, the limits may be altered by a roadside sign.

Like any other countries, drivers who violate the speed limit may be liable to a punishment. Currently the offender could be fined up to ฿1,000. Despite this, an amount on the ticket is set at ฿500.

In addition to road transport, speed limits also applies to rail transport. The maximum speed for a locomotive-hauled passenger train is 90 km/h (56 mph); except a diesel multiple unit, which can speed up to 120 km/h (75 mph).

== Description ==
Currently the road speed limits in Thailand are as follows:

The road speed limits in Thailand
| Vehicle Type | Within the built-up areas (km/h) | Outside the built-up areas (km/h) | Within the motorway (km/h) | Within the Expressway (km/h) |
|---|---|---|---|---|
| Car weighing 2,200 kg (4,850 lb) or less | 80 | 90-120 | 120 | 110 Elevated 100 |
| Bus and truck without a trailer | 60 | 90-100 | 100 | 90 Elevated 80 |
| Car weighing more than 2,200 kg (4,850 lb) | 60 | 90 | 90 | 90 Elevated 80 |
| Car or truck with a trailer | 45 | 65 | 80 | 90 Elevated 80 |
| Motor rickshaw (Tuk-Tuk) | 45 | 65 | Not allowed | Not allowed |
| Motorcycle | 60 and 80 | 80 and 100 | Not allowed | Not allowed |

The exception can be made by putting a speed limit sign (a white circle with a limit on the centre, bordered with red stripe) or a city limit (an amber board as shown on the right) sign, telling a driver to reduce the speed as appropriate.

City limit sign telling a driver to drive slower.

In addition to road vehicles, rail vehicles are also subject to the speed limits as follows. The exceptions can be made as a general notification of the State Railway of Thailand.

| Type | Maximum speed (km/h) |
|---|---|
| Locomotive-hauled passenger train | 90 |
| Diesel multiple unit | 120 |
| Freight and maintenance trains | 50 |
| Any trains being detached or combined | 10 |

Following figures are the speed limits for an ordinary railway line and a switch respectively. All the numbers are in km/h.

Speed limit for Thai railways. The upper figure shows the limit for diesel multiple units, while the lower limit applies to locomotive-hauled trains.

Switch speed limit. The upper number applies to straight-running trains, while the lower number is the limit for any diverging trains.

Engineering works speed limit. The driver must not exceed the specified speed until the train passes another sign cancelling the current limit.

== History ==
Since the introduction of the earliest law on road transport in 1934, a speed limit was set by the local government rather than the central government. The interior minister was empowered to set the ministerial rules or authorise the local governments to set their own speed limits. However, due to growing number of automobiles and discrepancies in the implementation, the original law was later amended and superseded in 1969. Instead of letting the local government to set speed limits, the central government took over the role. As part of the new law, speed limits were set, in 1969, as follows:-

- A typical small car weighing 1,200 kg (2,646 lb) or less:
  - 80 km/h (50 mph) within Bangkok metropolitan area, Pattaya city and other municipalities (collectively called built-up area);
  - 100 km/h (62 mph) outside the built-up areas.
- Standalone truck, a large car weighing more than 1,200 kg (2,646 lb), bus:
  - 60 km/h (37 mph) within the built-up areas;
  - 80 km/h (50 mph) outside the built-up areas.
- Trailer being towed and semi-trailer weighing more than 1,200 kg (2,646 lb) and auto rickshaw:
  - 45 km/h (28 mph) within the built-up areas;
  - 60 km/h (37 mph) outside the built-up areas.

12 years later, it was realised that 100 km/h (62 mph) was too high and not energy efficient. The government later altered the limit for a small car driving outside the built-up areas to 90 km/h (56 mph), which is still in use today. Since 1992, transport minister was empowered to set the ministerial rules about speed limits on highways instead.

In 1999, speed limits for motorways was introduced. Buses and small trucks can use up to 100 km/h (62 mph), while heavy good vehicles and trailers are limited at 80 km/h (50 mph). A typical small cars are allowed to be driven up to 120 km/h (75 mph).

Recently, there is an effort to increase the speed limit to 110 km/h (68 mph), despite the objection by health professionals. There is also an idea of a point system, in which a driver who violates a highway code, especially speeding, receives demerit points as well as a ticket.

In 2015, state failed to switch urban speed limit from 80 km/h to 50 km/h. Since 2017, municipalities/province can set appropriate speed limit. In September 2018, half of the 76 provinces have urban speed limit not exceeding 50 km/h.

== See also ==
- Road signs in Thailand
- Speed limit
- Speed limits by country
