= Road signs in the United States =

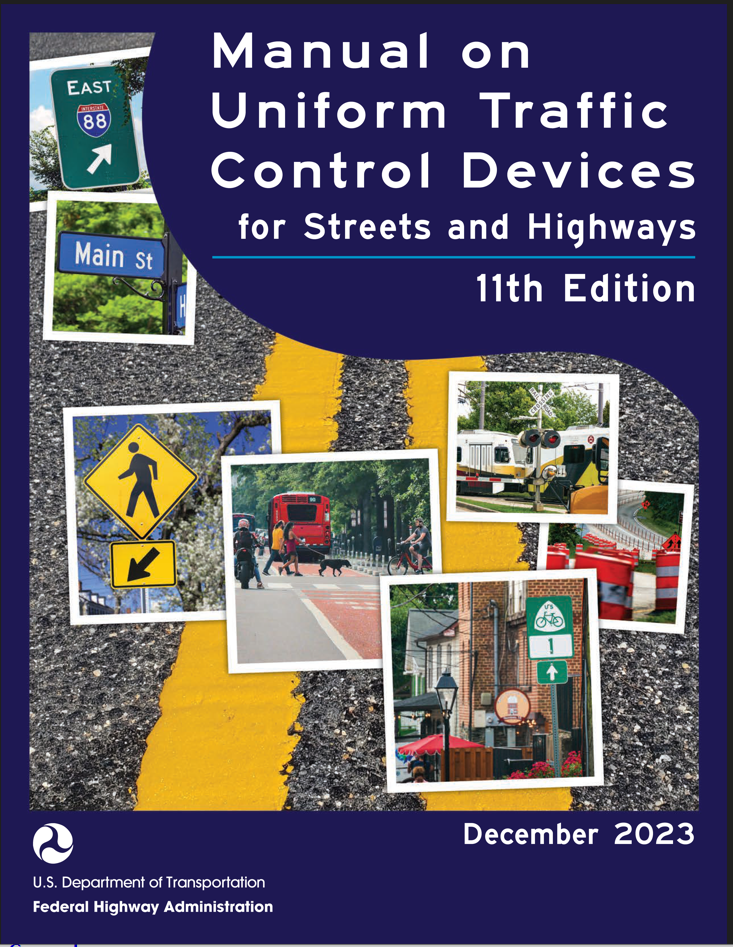
11th edition of the MUTCD, published December 2023

Road signs in the United States are, for the most part, standardized by federal regulations, most notably in the Manual on Uniform Traffic Control Devices (MUTCD) and its companion volume the Standard Highway Signs (SHS).

== Adoption and compliance ==
Map showing state adoption of the 2009 edition of the Manual on Uniform Traffic Control Devices: Adopted national MUTCD Adopted national MUTCD with state supplement Adopted state-specific MUTCD

The 11th edition of the MUTCD was released on December 19, 2023. The effective date of the MUTCD was January 18, 2024, 30 days after publication. States have two years after the effective date to do one of the following options: adopt the revised MUTCD, adopt the revised MUTCD with a state supplement, or adopt a state-specific MUTCD.

Eighteen states use the manual without alterations; 22 states, the District of Columbia, and Puerto Rico have adopted it in conjunction with a supplemental volume; and ten states have a state version in substantial conformance to the MUTCD. The MUTCD and SHS establish five categories of signs for road and highway use: regulatory signs, warning signs and object markers, guide signs, temporary traffic control signs, and school signs.

The list shown below does not cover all situations; the signage is from the national MUTCD unless specified.

== Regulatory signs ==
=== R1 series: Stop and yield ===
R1-1
Stop

R1-2
Yield

R1-2aP
To oncoming traffic (plaque)

R1-2bP
To traffic in circle (plaque)

R1-2cP
To all lanes (plaque)

R1-3P
All way (plaque)

R1-5R
Yield here to pedestrians (right)

R1-5L
Yield here to pedestrians (left)

R1-5aR
Yield here to school crossing (right)

R1-5aL
Yield here to school crossing (left)

R1-5bR
Stop here for pedestrians (right)

R1-5bL
Stop here for pedestrians (left)

R1-5cR
Stop here for school crossing (right)

R1-5cL
Stop here for school crossing (left)

R1-5dR
Yield here to trail crossing (right)

R1-5dL
Yield here to trail crossing (left)

R1-5eR
Stop here for trail crossing (right)

R1-5eL
Stop here for trail crossing (left)

R1-6
In-street pedestrian crossing (Note: The legend STATE LAW is optional.) (Note: A fluorescent yellow-green background color may be used instead of yellow for this sign.)

R1-6
In-street pedestrian crossing

R1-6a
In-street pedestrian crossing

R1-6a
In-street pedestrian crossing

R1-6b
In-street school crossing

R1-6c
In-street school crossing

R1-6d
In-street trail crossing

R1-6e
In-street trail crossing

R1-7
Wait on stop

R1-7a
Wait on stop - Go on slow

R1-8
Go on slow

R1-9
Overhead pedestrian crossing

R1-9
Overhead pedestrian crossing

R1-9a
Overhead pedestrian crossing

R1-9a
Overhead pedestrian crossing

R1-9b
Overhead school crossing

R1-9c
Overhead school crossing

R1-10P
Except right turn (plaque)

=== R2 series: Speed limit ===
R2-1
Speed limit

R2-2P
Truck speed limit (plaque)

R2-2aP
Buses speed limit (plaque)

R2-2bP
Trucks and buses speed limit (plaque)

R2-2cP
Vehicles over 5 tons speed limit (plaque)

R2-3P
Night speed limit (plaque)

R2-4P
Minimum speed limit (plaque)

R2-4a
Combined speed limit

R2-5P
Unless otherwise posted (plaque)

R2-5aP
Citywide (plaque)

R2-5bP
Neighborhood (plaque)

R2-5cP
Residential (plaque)

R2-6P
Fines higher (plaque)

R2-6aP
Fines double (plaque)

R2-6bP
Speeding fine (plaque)

R2-10
Begin higher/double fines zone

R2-11
End higher/double fines zone

R2-12
End work zone speed limit

R2-13
End variable speed limit

R2-14
End truck speed limit

=== R3 series: Lane usage and turns ===
R3-1
No right turn

R3-1a
No right turn for train (Activated, Blank-Out)

R3-1b
No right turn for trucks

R3-1c
No right turn for trucks and buses

R3-1d
No right turn for trucks over 4 tons

R3-1e
No right turn except buses

R3-1f
No right turn except buses and taxis

R3-1g
No right turn (times and days) (2-lines)

R3-1h
No right turn (times and days) (3-lines)

R3-1h
No right turn (times and days) (3-lines)

R3-2
No left turn

R3-2a
No left turn for train (Activated, Blank-Out)

R3-3
No turns

R3-4
No U-turn

R3-5R
Right turn only

R3-5L
Left turn only

R3-5a
Straight through only

R3-5bP
Left lane (plaque)

R3-5cP
Hov 2+ (plaque)

R3-5dP
Taxi lane (plaque)

R3-5fP
Right lane (plaque)

R3-5gP
Bus lane (plaque)

R3-5hP
Bike lane (plaque)

R3-6R
Optional movement lane control, straight through and right turn

R3-6L
Optional movement lane control, straight through and left turn

R3-6a
Optional movement lane control, U or left turn

R3-6b
Optional movement lane control, double left turns

R3-7R
Right lane must turn right

R3-7L
Left lane must turn left

R3-7aP
Except buses (plaque)

R3-7bP
Except bicycles (plaque)

R3-8R
Advance intersection lane control (two lanes) (right)

R3-8L
Advance intersection lane control (two lanes) (left)

R3-8aR
Advance intersection lane control (three lanes) (right)

R3-8aL
Advance intersection lane control (three lanes) (left)

R3-8b
Advance intersection lane control (three lanes)

R3-8xa
Advance intersection lane control with bike lane

R3-8xb
Advance intersection lane control with bike lane

R3-8xc
Advance intersection lane control with bike lane

R3-8zd
Advance circular intersection lane control (2 lanes)

R3-8ze
Advance circular intersection lane control (2 lanes)

R3-8zf
Advance circular intersection lane control (2 lanes)

R3-8zg
Advance circular intersection lane control (2 lanes)

R3-9a
Two-way left turn only (overhead)

R3-9b
Two-way left turn only (post-mounted)

R3-9cP
Begin (plaque)

R3-9dP
End (plaque)

R3-9e
Reversible lane control (overhead)

R3-9f
Reversible lane control (post-mounted)

R3-9g
Advance reversible lane control transition

R3-9h
Advance reversible lane control transition

R3-9i
End reverse lane

R3-10
HOV 2+ only, 2 or more persons per vehicle (post-mounted)

R3-10a
ILEV allowed (post-mounted)

R3-11
HOV 2+ only (times and days) (post-mounted)

R3-11a
2 right lanes, HOV 2+ only (times and days) (post-mounted)

R3-11b
HOV 2+ only (full-time) (post-mounted)

R3-11c
2 right lanes, HOV 2+ only (full-time) (post-mounted)

R3-11d
Right lane, buses only (times and days) (post-mounted)

R3-11e
Right lane, buses only (full-time) (post-mounted)

R3-11f
Shoulder, buses only (times and days) (post-mounted)

R3-11g
Shoulder, buses and right turns only (times and days) (post-mounted)

R3-11hP
Motorcycles allowed (plaque)

R3-12
HOV 2+ lane ahead (post-mounted)

R3-12a
HOV lane ends (post-mounted)

R3-12b
HOV lane ends (distance) (post-mounted)

R3-12c
HOV restriction ends (post-mounted)

R3-12d
HOV restriction ends (distance) (post-mounted)

R3-12e
Left lane, HOV 2+ only (distance) (post-mounted)

R3-12f
Bus lane ahead (post-mounted)

R3-12g
Bus lane ends (post-mounted)

R3-12h
Bus lane ends (distance) (post-mounted)

R3-13
HOV 2+ only, 2 or more persons per vehicle (overhead)

R3-13a
HOV 2+ only, 2 or more persons per vehicle (times and days) (overhead)

R3-14
HOV 2+ only (times and days) (1-line) (overhead)

R3-14a
HOV 2+ only (times and days) (2-lines) (overhead)

R3-14b
HOV 2+ only (full-time) (overhead)

R3-14c
Buses and taxis only (times and days) (overhead)

R3-15
HOV 2+ lane ahead (overhead)

R3-15a
HOV 2+ only begins (distance) (overhead)

R3-15b
HOV lane ends (overhead)

R3-15c
HOV restriction ends (overhead)

R3-15d
Bus lane ahead (overhead)

R3-15e
Bus lane ends (overhead)

R3-17
Bike lane

R3-17aP
Ahead (plaque)

R3-17bP
Ends (plaque)

R3-18
No U or left turn

R3-19
Lane for left turn only

R3-19a
Lane for U turn only

R3-19b
Lane for U and left turns only

R3-20R
Begin right turn lane

R3-20L
Begin left turn lane

R3-23
All turns from right lane (used at jug handles)

R3-23a
U turn from right lane (used at jug handles)

R3-24
All turns (diagonal right arrow) (used at jug handles)

R3-24a
U and left turns (diagonal right arrow) (used at jug handles)

R3-24b
U turn (diagonal right arrow) (used at jug handles)

R3-25
All turns (right arrow) (used at jug handles)

R3-25a
U and left turns (right arrow) (used at jug handles)

R3-25b
U turn (right arrow) (used at jug handles)

R3-26
U and left turns (straight arrow) (used at jug handles)

R3-26a
U turn (straight arrow) (used at jug handles)

R3-27
No straight through

R3-28
Toll pricing

R3-29P
Pay Toll (plaque)

R3-30P
Take Ticket (plaque)

R3-31
Electronic Toll Collection Pass Only

R3-32P
No Cash (plaque)

R3-33R
Right lane must exit

R3-33L
Left lane must exit

R3-33aR
Right lane must exit

R3-33aL
Left lane must exit

R3-40
HOV 2+, 2 or more persons per vehicle (post-mounted)

R3-42
Express lane ends (post-mounted)

R3-42a
Express lane ends (distance) (post-mounted)

R3-42b
Express restriction ends (post-mounted)

R3-42c
Express restriction ends (distance) (post-mounted)

R3-43
HOV 2+, 2 or more persons per vehicle (overhead)

R3-44
Toll Road Pass Only (Overhead)

R3-44a
Toll Road Pass or High Occupancy Vehicle (HOV) (Overhead)

R3-44b
Express lane only (Overhead)

R3-45
Express lane ends (Overhead)

R3-45a
Express restriction ends (Overhead)

R3-48
Toll Costs on Express Lane (Overhead)

R3-48a
Toll Costs on Express Lane or HOV (Overhead)

R3-51
Travel on shoulder allowed (times and days)

R3-51aP
No trucks (plaque)

R3-51bP
No trucks or buses (plaque)

R3-51cP
Emergency stopping only other times (plaque)

R3-51d
Travel on shoulder allowed when flashing

R3-51e
Travel on shoulder on green arrow only

R3-52
End travel on shoulder

R3-52a
Travel on shoulder ends (distance)

R3-52b
Shoulder must exit (distance)

R3-52c
Travel on shoulder begins (distance)

R3-56
Begin exit lane

R3-57P
To traffic on shoulder (plaque)

=== R4 series: Regulation of movement ===
R4-1
Do not pass

R4-2
Pass with care

R4-3
Slower traffic keep right

R4-4
Begin right turn lane yield to bikes

R4-5
Trucks use right lane

R4-7
Keep right

R4-7a
Keep right

R4-7b
Keep right

R4-7c
Keep right of obstacle

R4-8
Keep left

R4-8a
Keep left

R4-8b
Keep left

R4-8c
Keep left of obstacle

R4-9
Stay in lane

R4-9a
Stay in lane to merge point

R4-10
Runaway vehicles only

R4-12
Slow vehicles with five or more following vehicles must use turn-out

R4-13
Slow vehicles must use turn-out ahead

R4-14
Slow vehicles must turn out

R4-16
Keep right except to pass

R4-17
Do not drive on shoulder

R4-18
Do not pass on shoulder

R4-19
Bicycle passing clearance

R4-20R
All traffic must turn right

R4-20L
All traffic must turn left

R4-21R
Right turn only

R4-21L
Left turn only

=== R5 series: Exclusionary ===
R5-1
Do not enter

R5-1a
Wrong way

R5-1b
Wrong way for bicycles

R5-2
No trucks

R5-2aP
Except local delivery (plaque)

R5-2b
No thru trucks

R5-3
No motorized vehicles

R5-4
No commercial vehicles

R5-5
No lugged vehicles

R5-6
No bicycles

R5-7
No non-motorized traffic

R5-8
No motor-driven cycles

R5-10
No pedestrians, bicycles or motor-driven cycles

R5-10a
No pedestrians, bicycles or motor-driven cycles on freeway

R5-10b
No pedestrians or bicycles

R5-10c
No pedestrians

R5-10dP
On freeway (plaque)

R5-11
No unauthorized vehicles

R5-12
No thru traffic

=== R6 series: One way and divided highway ===
R6-1R
One way (right)

R6-1L
One way (left)

R6-2R
One way (with arrow) (right)

R6-2L
One way (with arrow)
(left)

R6-3
Divided highway crossing

R6-3a
Divided highway crossing, T-intersection

R6-5P
Roundabout circulation (plaque)

R6-6
Begin one way

R6-7
End one way

=== R7 series: Parking ===
R7-1
No parking any time

R7-2
No parking (times)

R7-2a
No parking (times) (alternative)

R7-3
No parking except Sundays and Holidays

R7-4
No standing any time

R7-4a
No stopping any time

R7-5
One hour parking

R7-6
No parking, loading zone

R7-8
Reserved parking (wheelchair)

R7-8aP
Van accessible (plaque)

R7-9
No parking, bike lane

R7-9a
No parking, bike lane

R7-10
Back-in parking only

R7-20
Parking fee station

R7-21
Two hour metered parking (times and days)

R7-21aP
Parking payments (plaque)

R7-22
Metered parking (times and days)

R7-107
No parking, bus stop

R7-107a
No parking, bus stop

R7-107b
No parking, bus stop with transit pictograph

R7-108
Two hour parking (times)

R7-111
No parking, except electric vehicles

R7-111a
No parking, (times) except electric vehicles

R7-112
Two hour parking, electric vehicles only

R7-112a
Two hour parking, electric vehicles only (times)

R7-112b
Two hour parking, electric vehicles only (times and days)

R7-113
No parking, except while charging

R7-113aP
Vehicle must be plugged in (plaque)

R7-113bP
Vacate stall when charging completed (plaque)

R7-114
Two hour, vehicle charging only

R7-114a
45 minute, vehicle charging only (times)

R7-114b
45 minute, vehicle charging only (times and days)

R7-200
No parking and one hour parking (times) (combined)

R7-200a
No parking and one hour parking (times) (combined)

R7-201P
Tow away zone

R7-201aP
Tow away zone (plaque)

R7-202P
This side of sign (plaque)

R7-203
Snow emergency route, no parking during snow emergency, tow-away zone

=== R8 series: Parking and emergency restrictions ===
R8-1
No parking on pavement

R8-2
No parking except on shoulder

R8-3
No parking

R8-3a
No parking (text)

R8-3c
No parking on pavement

R8-3d
No parking on bridge

R8-3e
No parking on tracks

R8-3f
No parking except on shoulder

R8-4
Emergency parking only

R8-5
No stopping on pavement

R8-6
No stopping except on shoulder

R8-7
Emergency stopping only

R8-8
Do not stop on tracks

R8-9
Tracks out of service

R8-10
Stop here when flashing

R8-10a
Stop here when flashing (alternative)

=== R9 series: Bicycles and pedestrians ===
R9-1
Walk on left facing traffic

R9-2
Cross only at cross walks

R9-3
No pedestrians crossing (symbol)

R9-3a
No pedestrians crossing

R9-3bP
Use crosswalk (plaque)

R9-3cP
Ride with traffic (plaque)

R9-4
No hitchhiking (symbol)

R9-4a
No hitchhiking

R9-5
Bicycles use pedestrian signal

R9-6
Bicycles yield to pedestrians

R9-7
Bicycles left, Pedestrians right

R9-8
Pedestrian Crosswalk

R9-9
Sidewalk Closed

R9-10
Sidewalk Closed Use Other Side

R9-11
Sidewalk Closed Ahead Cross Here

R9-11a
Sidewalk Closed Cross Here

R9-12
Bike lane closed

R9-13
No skaters

R9-14
No equestrians

R9-15
No snowmobiles

R9-16
No all-terrain vehicles

R9-19P
Except on shoulder (plaque)

R9-20
Bicycles allowed use of full lane

R9-21
Bicycles use shoulder only

R9-22
Bicycles must exit

R9-23
Bicycle all turns from bike lane

R9-23a
Bicycle left turn from bike lane

R9-23b
Bicycle left turn must use turn box

R9-23c
Bicycle left turn must use turn box

R9-24
Bicycle all turns (diagonal right arrow)

R9-24a
Bicycle all turns (right arrow)

R9-25
Bicycle U and left turns (diagonal right arrow)

R9-25a
Bicycle U and left turns (right arrow)

R9-25b
Bicycle U and left turns (straight arrow)

R9-26
Bicycle U turn (diagonal right arrow)

R9-26a
Bicycle U turn (right arrow)

R9-26b
Bicycle U turn (straight arrow)

R9-27
Bicycle left turn (diagonal right arrow)

R9-27a
Bicycle left turn (right arrow)

R9-27b
Bicycle left turn (straight arrow)

=== R10 series: Traffic signal ===
R10-1
Cross only on green

R10-2
Cross only on pedestrian signal

R10-3
Push button for pedestrian signal

R10-3a
Push button to cross street, wait for pedestrian signal

R10-3b
Crosswalk signal instructions

R10-3c
Crosswalk signal instructions

R10-3d
Crosswalk signal instructions

R10-3e
Crosswalk signal instructions

R10-3f
Crosswalk signal instructions

R10-3g
Crosswalk signal instructions

R10-3h
Crosswalk signal instructions

R10-3i
Crosswalk signal instructions

R10-4
Push button for green

R10-4a
Push button to cross street, wait for green

R10-5
Left on green arrow only

R10-6
Stop here on red

R10-6aR
Stop here on red (alternative) (right)

R10-6aL
Stop here on red (alternative) (left)

R10-7
Do not block intersection

R10-8
Use lane with green arrow

R10-10R
Right turn signal

R10-10L
Left turn signal

R10-10a
U turn Signal

R10-10bR
Right lane signal

R10-10bL
Left lane Signal

R10-10cR
Right turn lane signal

R10-10cL
Left turn lane signal

R10-11
No turn on red

R10-11a
No turn on circular red

R10-11b
No turn on red

R10-11c
No turn on red except from right lane

R10-11d
No turn on red from this lane

R10-12
Left turn yield on green

R10-12a
Left turn yield on flashing yellow arrow

R10-12b
Left turn yield to bicycle

R10-13
Emergency signal

R10-14
Emergency signal - stop on flashing red

R10-14a
Emergency signal - stop on flashing red (overhead)

R10-14b
Stop here on flashing red

R10-15R
Turning vehicles yield to pedestrians (right)

R10-15R
Turning vehicles yield to pedestrians (right)

R10-15L
Turning vehicles yield to pedestrians (left)

R10-15L
Turning vehicles yield to pedestrians (left)

R10-15a
Turning vehicles stop for pedestrians

R10-16
U-turn yield to right turn

R10-17a
Right on red arrow after stop

R10-18
Traffic laws photo enforced

R10-18a
Traffic signal photo enforced

R10-19P
Photo enforced (symbol) (plaque)

R10-19aP
Photo enforced (plaque)

R10-20aP
Days & times (plaque) (for use with R10-11 series) (3 lines)

R10-20aP
Days & times (plaque) (for use with R10-11 series) (2 lines)

R10-22
Bicycles to request green wait on line

R10-23
Crosswalk - stop on red

R10-23a
Stop on red - yield on flashing red after stop

R10-24
Bicycle push button for green light

R10-25
Push button for warning lights - wait for gap in traffic

R10-26
Bicycle push button for green light with arrow

R10-27
Left turn yield on flashing red arrow after stop

R10-28
One vehicle per green

R10-29
1 vehicle per green each lane

R10-30
Right turn on red must yield to U-turn

R10-31P
At signal (plaque)

R10-32P
Push button for 2 seconds for extra crossing time

R10-40
Bicycle signal mandatory movement (turn)

R10-40a
Bicycle signal mandatory movement (thru)

R10-41
Bicycle signal optional movement (thru and turn)

R10-41a
Bicycle signal optional movement (left and right turns)

R10-41b
Bicycle signal optional movement (all)

R10-41c
Bicycle signal optional movement (left and thru)

=== R11 series: Road closed ===
R11-1
Keep off median

R11-2
Road closed (Note: According to the 11th edition of MUTCD, STREET CLOSED (R11-2a), BRIDGE OUT (R11-2b), or PATH CLOSED (R11-2c) signs may be substituted for Road Closed signs where applicable.)

R11-2a
Street closed

R11-2b
Bridge out

R11-2c
Path closed

R11-3
Road closed (distance) miles ahead, local traffic only

R11-3a
Street closed (distance) miles ahead, local traffic only

R11-3b
Bridge out (distance) miles ahead, local traffic only

R11-4
Road closed to thru traffic

=== R12 series: Weight limits ===
R12-1
Weight limit

R12-2
Axle weight limit

R12-4
Weight limit with per axle and gross

R12-5
Weight limit with truck symbols

R12-6
Weight limit with special hauling vehicles

R12-7
Emergency vehicle weight limit

R12-7aP
Emergency vehicle weight limit (plaque)

=== R13 series: Weigh stations ===
R13-1
Trucks over 10 tons must enter weigh station next right

=== R14 series: Truck routes ===
R14-1
Truck route sign

R14-2
Hazardous material route

R14-3
Hazardous material prohibited

R14-4
National Network Route

R14-5
National Network prohibited

=== R15 series: Rail and light rail ===
R15-1
Railroad crossing (crossbuck)

R15-2P
Number of tracks

R15-3P
Vehicles required to stop are exempt from this regulation

R15-4a
Light rail only in right lane

R15-4b
Light rail only in left lane

R15-4c
Light rail only in center lane

R15-5
Do not pass stopped trains

R15-5a
Do not pass stopped train

R15-6
Do not drive on tracks

R15-6a
Do not drive on tracks

R15-7
Divided highway transit rail crossing

R15-7a
Divided highway transit rail crossing (T-intersection)

R15-8
Look both ways at track

=== R16 series: Seat belts and headlight use ===
R16-3
Move over or reduce speed for vehicles stopped on shoulder

R16-4
Minor crashes, move vehicles from travel lanes

R16-5
Lights on when using wipers

R16-6
Lights on when raining

R16-7
Turn on headlights next (distance) miles

R16-8
Turn on headlights

R16-9
Check headlights

R16-10
Begin daytime headlight section

R16-11
End daytime headlight section

R16-15
No hand-held phone use by driver

R16-15a
No hand-held phone use by driver

=== R22 series: Blasting zones ===
R22-2
Turn off 2-way radios and cell phones

== School signs ==
S1-1
School zone

School

S3-1
School bus stop ahead

S3-1 School bus stop ahead

S3-1 School bus stop ahead

School bus turn ahead

S3-2
School bus turn ahead

S4-1P
Times of day (plaque)

S4-2P
When children are present (plaque)

S4-3P
School (plaque)

S4-4P
When flashing (plaque)

S4-5
School speed limit ahead

S4-5a
School speed zone ahead

S4-6P
Days of week (plaque)

S4-7P
All year (plaque)

S5-1
School speed limit when flashing

S5-2
End school zone

S5-3
End school speed limit

== Warning signs ==
=== W1 series: Horizontal alignment ===
W1-1R
Turn (right)

W1-1L
Turn (left)

W1-2R
Curve (right)

W1-2L
Curve (left)

W1-3R
Reverse turn (right)

W1-3L
Reverse turn (left)

W1-4R
Reverse curve (right)

W1-4L
Reverse curve (left)

CW1-4R
Single lane shift (right)

CW1-4L
Single lane shift (left)

CW1-4bR
Double lane shift (right)

CW1-4bL
Double lane shift (left)

CW1-4cR
Triple lane shift (right)

CW1-4cL
Triple lane shift (left)

W1-5R
Winding road (right)

W1-5L
Winding road (left)

W1-6R
Arrow (right)

W1-6L
Arrow (left)

W1-7
Two-direction large arrow

W1-8R
Chevron (right)

W1-8L
Chevron (left)

W1-10R
Curve with side road (right)

W1-10L
Curve with side road (left)

W1-10aR
Curve with crossroad (right)

W1-10aL
Curve with crossroad (left)

W1-10bR
Curve with tangent (right)

W1-10bL
Curve with tangent (left)

W1-10cR
Curve with tangent from side (right)

W1-10cL
Curve with tangent from side (left)

W1-10dR
Reverse curve with side road (right)

W1-10dL
Reverse curve with side road (left)

W1-10eR
Reverse curve with crossroad (right)

W1-10eL
Reverse curve with crossroad (left)

W1-11R
Hairpin curve (right)

W1-11L
Hairpin curve (left)

W1-13R
Truck rollover warning (right)

W1-13L
Truck rollover warning (left)

W1-15R
270 degree loop curve (right)

W1-15L
270 degree loop curve (left)

=== W2 series: Intersections ===
W2-1
Crossroad

W2-2R
Side road (right)

W2-2L
Side road (left)

W2-3R
Side road at an acute angle (right)

W2-3L
Side road at an acute angle (left)

W2-3aR
Side road at an obtuse angle (right)

W2-3aL
Side road at an obtuse angle (left)

W2-4
T-intersection

W2-5
Y-intersection

W2-6
Roundabout

W2-7R
Offset side roads (right and left)

W2-7L
Offset side roads (left and right)

W2-8R
Double side roads (right)

W2-8L
Double side roads (left)

W2-10
Traffic Entering When Flashing

W2-11
Traffic Approaching When Flashing

=== W3 series: Advance traffic control ===
W3-1
Stop sign ahead

W3-2
Yield sign ahead

W3-3
Traffic light ahead

W3-4
Be prepared to stop

W3-5
Speed limit ahead

W3-5a
Speed zone ahead

W3-5b
Variable Speed Zone Ahead

W3-5c
Truck Speed Zone Ahead

W3-6
Draw bridge ahead

W3-7
Ramp meter ahead

W3-8
Ramp metered when flashing

W3-9
Traffic Using Shoulder (times and days)

=== W4 series: Lanes and merges ===
W4-1R
Merge (right)

W4-1L
Merge (left)

W4-2R
Lane ends (right)

W4-2L
Lane ends (left)

W4-3R
Added right lane

W4-3L
Added left lane

W4-4P
Cross traffic does not stop (plaque)

W4-4aPR
Traffic from right does not stop (plaque)

W4-4aPL
Traffic from left does not stop (plaque)

W4-4bP
Oncoming traffic does not stop (plaque)

W4-5R
Merge right (entering roadway)

W4-5L
Merge left (entering roadway)

W4-5aP
No merge area (plaque)

W4-6R
Added right lane (entering roadway)

W4-6L
Added left lane (entering roadway)

W4-7R
Heavy merge from right

W4-7L
Heavy merge from left

W4-8
Single lane transition

=== W5 series: Road width restrictions ===
W5-1
Road narrows

W5-2
Narrow bridge

W5-3
One lane bridge

W5-3a
One lane underpass

W5-4
Ramp narrows

W5-4a
Path narrows

=== W6 series: Divided highway ===
W6-1
Divided highway begins

W6-2
Divided highway ends

W6-3
Two-way traffic

W6-5
Two-way traffic (3-Lane, two lanes in the opposing direction)

W6-5a
Two-way traffic (3-Lane, one lane in the opposing direction)

=== W7 series: Hills ===
W7-1
Steep grade/hill

W7-2
Hill

W7-1a
Steep grade/hill percentage

W7-2P
Use low gear

W7-2bP
Trucks use lower gear

W7-3P
(percent) grade ahead

W7-3aP
Next (distance) miles ahead

W7-3bP
(percent) grade (distance) miles ahead

W7-4
Runaway truck ramp (distance)

W7-4b
Runaway truck ramp

W7-4c
Truck escape ramp

W7-4dP
Sand

W7-4eP
Gravel

W7-4fP
Paved

W7-5
Hill (bicycle)

W7-6
Hill blocks view

=== W8 series: Pavement and roadway conditions ===
W8-1
Bump

W8-2
Dip

W8-3
Pavement ends

W8-4
Soft shoulder

W8-5
Slippery when wet ahead

W8-5P
When wet (plaque)

W8-5aP
Ice (plaque)

W8-5bP
Steel deck (plaque)

W8-5cP
Excess oil (plaque)

W8-6
Truck crossing

W8-7
Loose gravel

W8-8
Rough road

W8-9
Low shoulder

W8-10
Bicycle slippery when wet ahead

W8-10P
Slippery when wet (plaque)

W8-11
Uneven lanes

W8-12
No center line

W8-13
Bridge ices before road

W8-14
Fallen rocks

W8-15
Grooved pavement

W8-15aP
Motorcycle (plaque)

W8-16
Metal bridge deck

W8-17R
Right shoulder drop-off ahead

W8-17L
Left shoulder drop-off ahead

W8-17P
Shoulder drop-off (plaque)

W8-18
Road may flood

W8-19
Depth gauge

W8-21
Gusty Winds Area

W8-22
Fog area

W8-23
No shoulder ahead

W8-25
Shoulder ends

W8-26
Road Ends (distance)

W8-26a
Street Ends (distance)

=== W9 series: Lane transitions ===
W9-1R
Right lane ends

W9-1L
Left lane ends

W9-4
Lanes Merge

W9-2R
Lane Ends Merge Right

W9-2L
Lane Ends Merge Left

W9-5
Bicycle Lane Ends

W9-5a
Bicycles Merging

W9-6
Pay toll (distance) cars (price)

W9-6a
Stop Ahead Pay Toll Cars (price)

W9-6bP
Pay toll (distance) cars (price) (plaque)

W9-6cP
Stop Ahead Pay Toll (Plaque)

W9-6dP
Stop Ahead Pay Toll (plaque)

W9-6e
Take Ticket (distance)

W9-6f
Stop Ahead Take Ticket

W9-6gP
Take Ticket (distance) (plaque)

W9-6hP
Stop Ahead Take Ticket (plaque)

W9-7R
Right lane for exit only

W9-7L
Left lane for exit only

=== W10 series: Railroad crossings ===
W10-1
Railroad crossing ahead

W10-1aP
Exempt (plaque)

W10-2R
Crossroads with parallel tracks (right)

W10-2L
Crossroads with parallel tracks (left)

W10-3R
Side road with parallel tracks (right)

W10-3L
Side road with parallel tracks (left)

W10-4R
T intersection with parallel tracks (right)

W10-4L
T intersection with parallel tracks (left)

W10-5
Low ground clearance railroad crossing

W10-5P
Low ground clearance plaque

W10-7
Light rail transit approaching sign (Activated, blank-out)

W10-8
Trains may exceed (speed)

W10-9
No train horn warning

W10-9P
No train horn plaque

W10-11
Storage space symbol

W10-11a
XX feet between tracks and highway

W10-11b
XX feet between highway and tracks behind you

W10-12R
Skewed crossing ahead (right) (this supplements the W10-1 sign but does not replace it)

W10-12L
Skewed crossing ahead (left) (this supplements the W10-1 sign but does not replace it)

W10-13P
No gates or lights (plaque)

W10-14P
Next crossing (plaque)

W10-14aP
Use next crossing (plaque)

W10-15P
Rough crossing (plaque)

W10-16
Another train coming (Activated, Blank-Out)

W10-21
Busway Crossing

W10-21aP
Signal Ahead (plaque)

=== W11 series: Advance warnings ===
W11-1
Bicycle (Note: A fluorescent yellow-green background color may be used for this sign.)

W11-2
Pedestrian Crossing

W11-3
Deer

W11-4
Cattle

W11-5
Farm vehicles

W11-6
Snowmobile

W11-7
Equestrian

W11-8
Emergency vehicle

W11-9
Handicapped

W11-10
Truck

W11-11
Golf cart

W11-12P
Emergency signal ahead (plaque)

W11-14
Horse-drawn vehicles

W11-15
Bicycle and pedestrians

W11-15P
Trail x-ing (plaque)

W11-15a
Trail crossing

W11-16
Bear

W11-17
Sheep

W11-18
Ram

W11-19
Donkey

Duck

W11-20
Elk

W11-21
Moose

W11-22
Wild horse

=== W12 series: Low clearance warnings ===
W12-1
Double arrow

W12-2
Low clearance

W12-2a
Low Clearance (Overhead)

W12-2b
Low Clearance (Overhead)

=== W13 series: Advisory speeds ===
W13-1P
Speed advisory

W13-1aP
Speed advisory Confirmation (plaque)

W13-2
Exit speed advisory

W13-3
Ramp speed advisory

W13-6
Exit speed advisory (270 degree loop curve)

W13-7
Ramp speed advisory (270 degree loop curve)

W13-8
Exit speed advisory (hairpin curve)

W13-9
Ramp speed advisory (hairpin curve)

W13-10
Exit speed advisory (turn)

W13-11
Ramp speed advisory (turn)

W13-12
Exit speed advisory (truck rollover)

W13-13
Ramp speed advisory (truck rollover)

W13-20
Variable Speed Feedback

W13-20aP
Variable Speed Feedback (plaque)

=== W14 series: Dead end streets and no passing zones ===
W14-1
Dead end

W14-1aR
Dead end on the right

W14-1aL
Dead end on the left

W14-2
No outlet

W14-2aR
No outlet on the right

W14-2aL
No outlet on the left

W14-3
No passing zone

=== W15 series: Playgrounds ===
W15-1
Playground

=== W16 series: Supplemental plaques ===
W16-1P
In Road (plaque)

W16-1aP
In Street (plaque)

W16-2P
(distance) feet

W16-2aP
(distance) feet

W16-3P
(distance) miles

W16-3aP
(distance) miles

W16-4P
Next (distance) feet

W16-5PR
Supplemental arrow to the right (plaque) (Note: The background color (yellow, fluorescent yellow-green or orange) shall match the color of the warning sign that it supplements.)

W16-5PL
Supplemental arrow to the left (plaque)

W16-6PR
Supplemental arrow to the right (plaque)

W16-6PL
Supplemental arrow to the left (plaque)

W16-7PR
Downward diagonal arrow to the right (plaque)

W16-7PL
Downward diagonal arrow to the left (plaque)

W16-7aP
Dual Downward Diagonal Arrow (plaque)

W16-8P
Advance Street Name Plaque

W16-8aP
Advance Street Name Plaque (double arrow)

W16-9P
Ahead

W16-10P
Photo enforced (symbol)

W16-10aP
Photo enforced

W16-11P
HOV

W16-12P
Traffic circle plaque

W16-12aP
Roundabout junction plaque

W16-13P
When flashing

W16-15P
New

W16-16P
Last Exit Before Toll (1-line plaque)

W16-16aP
Last Exit Before Toll (2-line plaque)

W16-17P
Toll (plaque)

W16-18P
Notice

W16-19P
Last In Corridor (plaque)

W16-20P
Except Bicycles (plaque)

W16-21P
2-Way Bicycle Cross Traffic (plaque)

=== W17 series: Speed humps ===
W17-1
Speed hump

=== W18 series: No traffic signs ===
W18-1
No traffic signs

=== W19 series: Freeway or expressway end signs ===
W19-1
Freeway ends (distance)

W19-2
Expressway ends (distance)

W19-3
Freeway ends

W19-4
Expressway ends

W19-5
All traffic must exit

=== W20 series: Work zones ===
CW20-1
Road work (distance) ahead

CW20-1b
Path work (distance) ahead

CW20-2
Detour (distance) ahead

CW20-2a
Bicycle detour (distance) ahead

CW20-3
Road closed (distance) ahead

CW20-3a
Path closed (distance) ahead

CW20-4
One lane road (distance) ahead

CW20-5R
Right lane closed (distance) ahead

CW20-5aR
2 right lanes closed (distance) ahead

CW20-5b
Bike lane closed (distance) ahead

CW20-7
Flagger ahead (symbol sign)

CW20-7a
Flagger ahead (text sign)

=== W21 series: Road work ===
CW21-1
Workers (symbol sign)

CW21-1a
Workers (text sign)

CW21-2
Fresh oil (tar)

CW21-3
Road machinery (distance) ahead

CW21-4
Slow moving vehicle

CW21-5
Shoulder work

CW21-5aR
Right Shoulder Closed

CW21-5bR
Right Shoulder Closed (distance) ahead

CW21-6
Survey crew

CW21-7
Utility work (distance) ahead

CW21-8
Mowing (distance) ahead

=== W22 series: Blasting zones ===
CW22-1
Blasting zone (distance) ahead

CW22-3
End blasting zone

=== W23 series: Slow traffic ===
W23-2
New traffic pattern ahead

W23-2a
New Signal Operation Ahead

=== W24 series: Lane shifts ===
CW24-1R
Double reverse curve (right) (1 lane)

CW24-1L
Double reverse curve (left) (1 lane)

CW24-1aR
Double reverse curve (right) (2 lanes)

CW24-1aL
Double reverse curve (left) (2 lanes)

CW24-1bR
Double reverse curve (right) (3 lanes)

CW24-1bL
Double reverse curve (left) (3 lanes)

CW24-1cP
All lanes

=== W25 series: Oncoming traffic has extended green ===
W25-1
Oncoming traffic has extended green

W25-2
Oncoming traffic may have extended green

=== W26 series: Watch for stopped traffic ===
W26-1
Watch For Stopped Traffic

=== Object markers ===
OM1-1
Object Marker

OM1-2
Object Marker

OM1-3
Object Marker

OM2-1V
Vertical Culvert Marker

OM2-1H
Horizontal Culvert Marker

OM2-2V
Vertical Culvert Marker

OM2-2H
Horizontal Culvert Marker

OM3-R
Right Object Marker

OM3-C
Chevron Object Marker

OM3-L
Left Object Marker

OM4-1
End Of Road Marker

OM4-2
End Of Road Marker

OM4-3
End Of Road Marker

== Route marker signs ==
=== M1 series: Route shields ===
M1-1
Interstate Route Marker (2 digits)

M1-1
Interstate Route Marker (3 digits)

M1-1a
Interstate Route Marker with State (2 digits)

M1-1a
Interstate Route Marker with State (3 digits)

M1-2
Off interstate business route marker (loop) (2 digits)

M1-2
Off interstate business route marker (loop) (3 digits)

M1-3
Off interstate business route marker (spur) (2 digits)

M1-3
Off interstate business route marker (spur) (3 digits)

M1-4
US route marker (2 digits)

M1-4
US route marker (3 digits)

M1-5
State Route Marker (2 digits)

M1-5
State Route Marker (3 digits)

M1-6
County Route Marker

M1-7
Forest Route

M1-8
State or local Bicycle Route

M1-8a
State or local Bicycle route

M1-8b
Non-numbered bicycle route (2 lines)

M1-8c
Non-numbered bicycle route (3 lines)

M1-9
U.S. bicycle route

M1-10
Eisenhower interstate system

M1-10a
Eisenhower interstate system

=== M2 series: Junction markers ===
M2-1P
Junction (plaque)

M2-2
Combination junction (2 route signs)

=== M3 series: Cardinal direction markers ===
M3-1P
Cardinal Direction - North (plaque)

M3-2P
Cardinal Direction - East (plaque)

M3-3P
Cardinal Direction - South (plaque)

M3-4P
Cardinal Direction - West (plaque)

=== M4 series: Route marker auxiliaries ===
M4-1P
Alternate (plaque)

M4-1aP
Alt (plaque)

M4-2P
By-Pass (plaque)

M4-3P
Business (plaque)

M4-4P
Truck (plaque)

M4-5P
To (plaque)

M4-6P
End (plaque)

M4-7P
Temporary (plaque)

M4-7aP
Temp (plaque)

M4-8P
Detour (plaque)

M4-8a
End detour

M4-8bP
End (plaque) (if a road work blocked road)

M4-9R
Detour Right Arrow

M4-9L
Detour Left Arrow

M4-9aR
Bicycle and Pedestrian Detour Right Arrow

M4-9aL
Bicycle and Pedestrian Detour Left Arrow

M4-9bR
Pedestrian Detour Right Arrow

M4-9bL
Pedestrian Detour Left Arrow

M4-9cR
Bicycle Detour Right Arrow

M4-9cL
Bicycle Detour Left Arrow

M4-10R
Detour Right Arrow

M4-10L
Detour Left Arrow

M4-11
Emergency Route

M4-11a
Emergency Route

M4-11bP
Emergency Route To (Plaque)

M4-11cP
Emergency Route To (Plaque)

M4-12
End Emergency Route

M4-14P
Begin (Plaque)

M4-15P
Toll (Plaque)

M4-16P
No Cash (Plaque)

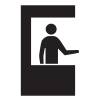
M4-17
Toll Collector Symbol Panel

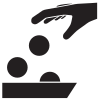
M4-18
Exact Change Symbol Panel

M4-20
Electronic Toll Collection Only

=== M5 series: Advance turn arrow auxiliary signs ===
M5-1PR
Advance Right Turn Arrow (90 Degree Angle)

M5-1PL
Advance Left Turn Arrow (90 Degree Angle)

M5-2PR
Advance Right Turn Arrow (45 Degree Angle)

M5-2PL
Advance Left Turn Arrow (45 Degree Angle)

M5-3PR
Advance Right Turn Arrow (Circular Intersection)

M5-3PL
Advance Left Turn Arrow (Circular Intersection)

M5-4P
Lane Designation - Left Lane (Plaque)

M5-5P
Lane Designation - Center Lane (Plaque)

M5-6P
Lane Designation - Right Lane (Plaque)

=== M6 series: Directional arrow auxiliary signs ===
M6-1PR
Right Directional Arrow

M6-1PL
Left Directional Arrow

M6-2PR
Diagonal Right Directional Arrow

M6-2PL
Diagonal Left Directional Arrow

M6-2aPR
Downward Diagonal Right Directional Arrow

M6-2aPL
Downward Diagonal Left Directional Arrow

M6-3P
Straight Directional Arrow

M6-4P
Double Directional Arrow

M6-5PR
Double Diagonal Right Directional Arrow

M6-5PL
Double Diagonal Left Directional Arrow

M6-6PR
Straight And Right Directional Arrow

M6-6PL
Left And Straight Directional Arrow

M6-7PR
Straight And Diagonal Right Directional Arrow

M6-7PL
Diagonal Left And Straight Directional Arrow

=== M10 series: Scenic area ===
M10-1
National Scenic Byway

M10-1aP
National Scenic Byway (plaque)

M10-2
Byway identification

M10-2aP
Byway identification (plaque)

M10-3
State scenic byway system

M10-3a
State scenic byway system - simple graphic and byway identification

M10-3bP
Scenic byway (plaque)

=== M11 series: National Historic Trails ===
M11-1
National Historic Trail - Identification

M11-1aP
National Historic Trail - Historic Route (plaque)

M11-1bP
National Historic Trail - Crossing (plaque)

M11-1cP
National Historic Trail - Auto Tour Route (Plaque)

M11-1dP
National Historic Trail - Distance (plaque)

== Destination signs ==
=== D1 series: Destination ===
D1-1
Destination (1-line)

D1-1a
Destination and Distance (1-line)

D1-1b
Bicycle Destination (1-line)

D1-1c
Bicycle Destination and Distance (1-line)

D1-1d
Destination (Circular Intersection) (1-line)

D1-1e
Destination with route shield (Circular Intersection) (1-line)

D1-2
Destination (2-lines)

D1-2a
Destination and Distance (2-line)

D1-2b
Bicycle Destination (2-line)

D1-2c
Bicycle Destination and Distance (2-line)

D1-2d
Destination (Circular Intersection) (2-lines)

D1-3
Destination (3-lines)

D1-3a
Destination and Distance (3-lines)

D1-3b
Bicycle Destination (3-line)

D1-3c
Bicycle Destination and Distance (3-lines)

D1-3d
Destination (Circular Intersection) (3-lines)

D1-5
Circular Intersection Destination (Diagrammatic)

D1-5a
Circular Intersection Destination (Diagrammatic)

=== D2 series: Distance ===
D2-1
Distance (1-line)

D2-1a
Bicycle Distance (1-line)

D2-2
Distance (2-lines)

D2-2a
Bicycle Distance (2-lines)

D2-3
Distance (3-lines)

D2-3a
Bicycle Distance (3-lines)

=== D3 series: Street name ===
D3-1
Street Name

D3-1a
Street Name with route shield

D3-2
Advance street name (2-lines)

D3-2
Advance street name (3-lines)

D3-2
Advance street name (3-lines)

D3-2
Advance street name (4-lines)

=== D4 series: Parking ===
D4-1
Parking area

D4-2
Park - Ride

D4-3
Bicycle parking area

D4-4
Bicycle-sharing station

D4-4a
Bicycle lockers

=== D5 series: Rest area ===
D5-1
Rest area (distance)

D5-1a
Rest area next right

D5-2
Rest area (diagonal right arrow)

D5-2a
Rest area gore

D5-5
Rest area

D5-6
Next rest area (distance) miles

D5-7
Rest area - tourist info center (distance)

D5-7a
Rest area - tourist info center next right

D5-8
Rest area - tourist info center (diagonal right arrow)

D5-9
Parking area (distance)

D5-9a
Parking area (diagonal right arrow)

D5-9b
Parking area gore

D5-10
Picnic area (distance)

D5-10a
Picnic area (diagonal right arrow)

D5-10b
Picnic area gore

D5-11
Scenic area (distance)

D5-11a
Scenic area (diagonal right arrow)

D5-11b
Scenic area gore

D5-12
Interstate oasis

D5-12aP
Interstate oasis (plaque)

D5-12b
Interstate oasis

D5-13
Brake check area (distance)

D5-14
Brake check area (diagonal right arrow)

D5-15
Chain-up area (distance)

D5-16
Chain-up area (diagonal right arrow)

=== D8 series: Weigh station ===
D8-1
Weigh station (distance)

D8-1a
Weigh station ahead

D8-2
Weigh station next right

D8-3
Weigh station (diagonal right arrow)

=== D10 series: Reference location ===
D10-1
Reference location (1 digit)

D10-1a
Intermediate reference location (1 digit)

D10-2
Reference location (2 digit)

D10-2a
Intermediate reference location (2 digit)

D10-3
Reference location (3 digit)

D10-3a
Intermediate reference location (3 digit)

D10-4
Enhanced reference location

D10-5
Intermediate enhanced reference location

=== D11 series: Bicycle facility and shared-use path ===
D11-1
Bike route

D11-1bP
Bike route (plaque)

D11-1c
Bike route with destination

D11-10a
Shared-use path destination (1-line)

D11-10b
Shared-use path destination (2-lines)

D11-10c
Shared-use path destination (3-lines)

D11-10d
Shared-use path destination and distance (1-line)

D11-10e
Shared-use path destination and distance (2-lines)

D11-10f
Shared-use path destination and distance (3-lines)

D11-11
Bicycles permitted

D11-12
Pedestrians permitted

D11-13
Skaters permitted

D11-14
Equestrians permitted

D11-20
Bicycle left turn may use turn box

D11-20a
Bicycle left turn box

=== D12 series: Radio, telephone and carpool information ===
D12-1
Radio-Weather information

D12-1a
Radio-Traffic information

D12-1bP
Urgent message when flashing (plaque)

D12-2
Carpool information

D12-3
Channel 9 monitored

D12-4
Emergency call 911

D12-5
Travel info call 511 (pictograph)

D12-5a
Travel info call 511

D12-6
Roadside assistance

=== D13 series: Crossover and freeway entrance ===
D13-1
Crossover

D13-2
Crossover (Distance)

D13-3
Freeway entrance

D13-3a
Freeway entrance

=== D15 series: Combination lane use/destination ===
D15-1
Combination lane use/destination with route shield

D15-1
Combination lane use/destination with street name

=== D17 series: Truck lane and slow vehicle signs ===
D17-1
Next truck lane (distance)

D17-2
Truck lane (distance)

D17-3
Next passing lane (distance)

D17-4
Passing lane (distance)

D17-5
Emergency turn-out (distance)

D17-6
Emergency turn-out (diagonal right arrow)

D17-7
Slow vehicle turn-out (distance)

== Construction information signs ==
G20-1
Road work next (distance) miles

G20-2
Road work ends

G20-4
Pilot car follow me

G20-5aP
Work zone (plaque)

IA-23-1P
Turn Only In Direction Of Arrow (plaque)
Used with RDTS

== Recreational and cultural interest areas ==
RS-002
Smoking

RS-005
Tunnel

RS-006
Fire lookout tower

RS-007
Lighthouse

RS-008
Falling rocks

RS-009
Dam

RS-010
Fish hatchery

RS-011
Deer viewing area

RS-012
Bear viewing area

RS-013
Drinking water

RS-015
Ranger station

RS-017
Pets on leash

RS-020
Grocery store

RS-021
Men's restroom

RS-022
Restroom

RS-023
Women's restroom

RS-024
First aid

RS-026
Post office

RS-027
Mechanic

RS-030
Lockers/Storage

RS-031
Bus stop

RS-034
Parking

RS-035
Showers

RS-036
Viewing area

RS-037
Sleeping shelter

RS-039
Picnic shelter

RS-040
Trailer site

RS-041
Sanitary station

RS-042
Campfire

RS-043
Trail shelter

RS-044
Picnic

RS-045
Kennel

RS-046
Skiing

RS-047
Downhill skiing

RS-048
Ski jumping

RS-049
Sledding

RS-050
Ice skating

RS-052
Snowmobiling

RS-053
Marina

RS-054
Boat ramp

RS-055
Motorboating

RS-056
Sailing

RS-057
Rowboating

RS-058
Water skiing

RS-059
Surfing

RS-060
Scuba diving

RS-061
Swimming

RS-062
Diving

RS-063
Fishing

RS-064
Horse trail

RS-067
Off road vehicle trail

RS-068
Hiking trail

RS-070
Amphitheatre

RS-071
Tramway

RS-073
Stable

RS-076
Wildlife viewing

RS-077
Winter recreation area

RS-078
Snowshoeing

RS-079
Canoeing

RS-080
Point of interest

RS-081
Technical rock climbing

RS-082
Climbing

RS-083
Rock collecting

RS-084
Spelunking

RS-085
Laundromat

RS-086
Litter receptacle

RS-087
Tour boat

RS-088
Wading

RS-089
Fish ladder

RS-090
Fire extinguisher

RS-091
Trash dumpster

RS-092
Ice fishing

RS-093
Fish cleaning

RS-094
Life jacket

RS-095
All terain trail

RS-096
Baseball field

RS-097
Fitness

RS-098
Skateboarding

RS-099
Rattlesnake

RS-101
Cans or bottles

RS-102
Snack bar

RS-103
Radio

RS-104
Recreational vehicle

RS-105
Chairlift

RS-106
Seal viewing

RS-107
Whale viewing

RS-108
Windsurfing

RS-109
Theatre

RS-111
Stroller

RS-113
Driving tour

RS-114
Interpretive trail

RS-115
Seaplane

RS-116
Archery

RS-122
Walk on boardwalk

RS-123
Stay on trail

RS-125
In-line skate

RS-126
Hang gliding

RS-127
Snowboarding

RS-128
Golf course

RS-129
Tennis

RS-137
Baby changing station (Men's Restroom)

RS-138
Baby changing station (Women's restroom

RS-140
Pickup truck

RS-141
Nature study

RS-142
Cultural interest area

RS-143
Dog sledding

RS-144
Snow tubing

RS-145
Beach

RS-146
Rafting

RS-147
Boat motor

RS-148
Walk-in camp

RS-149
Pen (enclosure)

RS-200
Recycling

== Motorist services ==
D9-1
Telephone

D9-2
Hospital

D9-3
Camping

D9-4
Litter container

D9-6
Handicapped accessible

D9-6P
Van accessible (plaque)

D9-7
Gasoline

D9-8
Food

D9-9
Lodging

D9-10
Tourist information

D9-11
Diesel fuel

D9-11a
Alternative fuel (compressed natural gas)

D9-11b
Electric vehicle charging

D9-11bP
Electric vehicle charging (plaque)

D9-11c
Alternative fuel (ethanol)

D9-11d
Alternative fuel (liquefied natural gas)

D9-11e
Alternative fuel (liquefied petroleum gas)

D9-11f
Alternative fuel (hydrogen)

D9-11g
Alternative fuel (biofuel)

D9-12
RV sanitary station

D9-13
Emergency medical services

D9-13aP
Hospital (plaque)

D9-13bP
Ambulance station (plaque)

D9-13cP
Emergency medical care (plaque)

D9-13dP
Trauma center (plaque)

D9-14
Police

D9-16
Truck parking

D9-16aP
Truck external power (plaque)

D9-16b
Truck parking availability - exit number

D9-16c
Truck parking availability - distance

D9-16c
Truck parking availability - distance

D9-16d
Truck parking availability - rest area

D9-16d
Truck parking availability - rest area

D9-16e
Truck parking availability - combined

D9-16e
Truck parking availability - combined

D9-16e
Truck parking availability - combined

D9-16e
Truck parking availability - combined

D9-17P
Next services (distance) (plaque)

D9-17a
Next EV charging (distance)

D9-18
General services (up to 6 symbols) with exit number

D9-18a
General services with exit number

D9-18b
General services (up to 6 symbols) with action message

D9-18c
General services with action message

D9-18dP
Rural interchange general services (up to 3 symbols) (plaque)

D9-18eP
Rural interchange general services (1 line) (plaque)

D9-18fP
Rural interchange general services (2 lines) (plaque)

D9-19
Alternative fuels corridor

D9-19aP
Alternative fuels corridor (1 line) (plaque)

D9-19bP
Alternative fuels corridor (2 lines) (plaque)

D9-20
Pharmacy

D9-20aP
24 HR (plaque)

D9-21
Telecommunication (TDD/TTY)

D9-22
Wireless internet

== General information ==
I1-1
Traffic signal speed

I2-1
State line

I2-2
River

I2-3
Grade separation identification (1-line)

I2-3
Grade separation identification (1-line)

I2-3a
Grade separation identification (2-line)

I2-3a
Grade separation identification (2-line)

I2-4
Future interstate corridor

I2-4a
Future I-XX Corridor

I2-5
Project information

I2-5
Project information

I3-5
Airport

I3-6
Bus station

I3-7
Train station

I3-8
Light rail station

I3-9
Vehicle Ferry Terminal

I3-10
Passenger Only Ferry Terminal

I3-10P
Ferry (plaque)

I4-1
Library

I4-2
Recycling center

I13-1
Emergency Notification

I13-2
Push to Exit

I20-1
Acknowledgement

I20-2
Acknowledgement

I20-3
Acknowledgement

I20-4
Acknowledgement - Rest area

I20-4a
Acknowledgement - Welcome Center

I20-5P
Acknowledgement (plaque)

== Freeway and expressway signs ==
=== E1 series: Exit number ===
E1-1
Interchange Advance Guide (1 Destination)

E1-2
Interchange Advance Guide (2 Destinations)

E1-3
Interchange Advance Guide (3 Destinations)

E1-5P
1 or 2 Digit Exit Number (plaque)

E1-5aP
3 Digit Exit Number (plaque)

E1-5bP
1 or 2 Digit Exit Number with single letter suffix (plaque)

E1-5cP
3 Digit Exit Number with single letter suffix (plaque)

E1-5dP
1 or 2 Digit Exit Number with dual letter suffix (plaque)

E1-5eP
3 Digit Exit Number with dual letter suffix (plaque)

E1-5fP
1 or 2 Digit Left Exit Number (plaque)

E1-5gP
3 Digit Left Exit Number (plaque)

E1-5hP
1 or 2 Digit Left Exit Number with single letter suffix (plaque)

E1-5iP
3 Digit Left Exit Number with single letter suffix (plaque)

E1-5jP
1 or 2 Digit Left Exit Number with dual letter suffix (plaque)

E1-5kP
3 Digit Left Exit Number with dual letter suffix (plaque)

E1-5mP
Left (plaque)

Specific services sign

=== E2 series: Next exit ===
E2-1P
Next Exit (1 Line) (Plaque)

E2-1aP
Next Exit (2 Lines) (Plaques)

=== E4 series: Exit direction ===
E4-1
Exit Direction (1 Destination)

E4-2
Exit Direction (2 Destinations)

E4-3
Exit Direction (3 Destinations)

=== E5 series: Exit gore ===
E5-1
Exit Gore (No Exit Number

E5-1a
Exit Gore (1 or 2 Digits)

E5-1bP
Exit Number (plaque)

E5-1c
Narrow Exit Gore

E5-2
Exit Open

E5-2a
Exit Closed

E5-3
Exit Only

=== E6 series: Pull-through ===
E6-1
Pull-Through

E6-1a
Pull-Through (Destination)

=== E7 series: Post-interchange distance ===
E7-3
Post-Interchange Distance (3 lines)

E7-4
Post-Interchange Travel Time

E7-5
Distance and Travel Time

E7-5
Distance and Travel Time

E7-6
Comparative Travel Time

=== E8 series: Preferential lane entrance, exit, and intermediate egress ===
E8-1
Preferential Lane Entrance Gore

E8-1a
Preferantial Lane Intermediate Entrance Gore

E8-2
Preferential Lane Entrance Direction (Overhead)

E8-2a
Preferential Lane Entrance Direction (Post-Mounted)

E8-3
Preferential Lane Entrance Advance

E8-4
Preferential Lane Direct Exit Gore

E8-5
Preferential Lane Intermediate Egress Direction

E8-6
Preferential Lane Intermediate Egress Advance

=== E11 series: Panels ===
E11-1
Exit Only (With Arrow)

E11-1a
Exit

E11-1b
Only

E11-1c
Exit Only

E11-1d
Exit Only (With Arrow)

E11-1e
Exit Only (With 2 Arrows)

E11-1f
Exit Only (With 2 Arrows)

E11-2
Left (Panel)

=== E13 series: Exit advisory speed ===
E13-2
Exit Direction Advisory Speed - Exit (Panel)

E13-2
Exit Direction Advisory Speed - Ramp (Panel)

== Emergency management signs ==
EM1-1
Evacuation route

EM1-1a
Hurricane evacuation route

EM1-2
Tsunami evacuation route

EM2-1
Area Closed

EM2-2
Traffic Control Point

EM2-3
Maintain Top Safe Speed

EM2-4
Road Use Permit Required For Thru Traffic

EM3-1
Medical Center

EM3-1a
Welfare Center

EM3-1b
Registration Center

EM3-1c
Decontamination Center

EM4-1
Emergency Shelter

EM4-1a
Hurricane Shelter

EM4-1b
Fallout Shelter

EM4-1c
Chemical Shelter

== See also ==
- Comparison of traffic signs in English-speaking countries
- Crosswalks in North America
- Glossary of road transport terms
- Road signs in Canada
- Road signs in Puerto Rico
