= Road signs in Canada =

Road signs in Canada may conform to the Manual of Uniform Traffic Control Devices for Canada (MUTCDC) by the Transportation Association of Canada (TAC) for use by Canadian jurisdictions. Although it serves a similar role to the MUTCD from the US Federal Highway Administration, it has been independently developed and has a number of key differences with its American counterpart, most notably the inclusion of bilingual (English/French) signage for jurisdictions such as New Brunswick with significant francophone populations, as well as a heavier reliance on symbols rather than text legends.

== Language ==
In Canada most of the road signs are written in English or French.

"All federal government-only signs and signs for highway use must be bilingual regardless of whether mandated by local, provincial or territorial language requirements," except for some places.

In Nunavut the four official languages (including Inuktitut and Inuinnaqtun, also French and English) must be used. On the Sea to Sky Highway (BC 99) places are labelled in Squamish names, (e.g. "K'emk'emeláy" (Vancouver)).

=== Stop sign ===
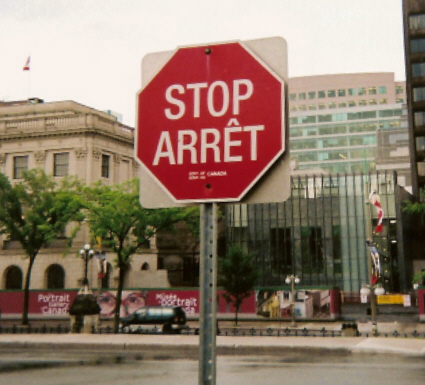
Bilingual (English and French) stop sign on Parliament Hill in Ottawa.

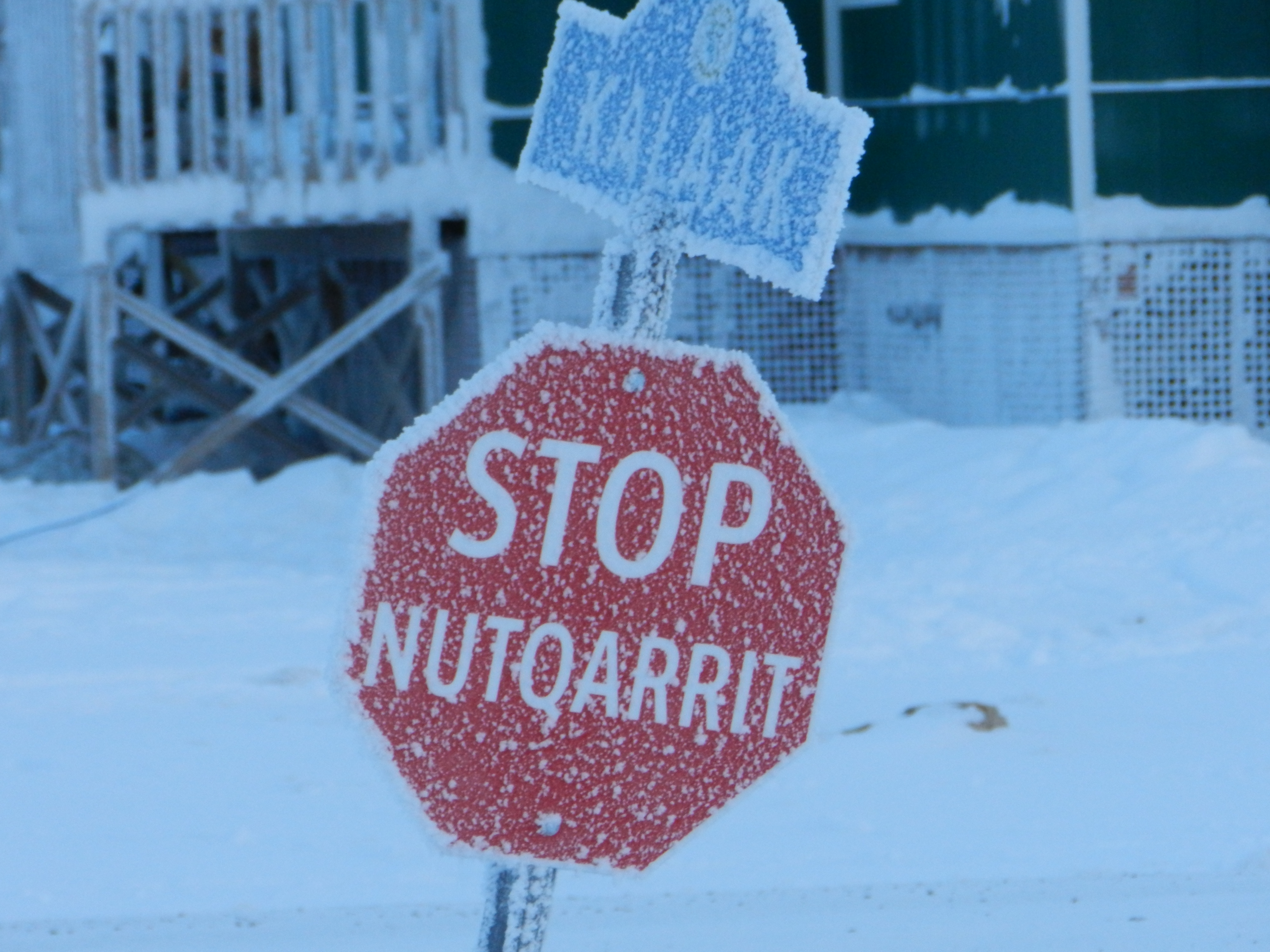
Bilingual (English and Inuinnaqtun) in Cambridge Bay.

Under federal jurisdiction, the Office of the Commissioner of Official Languages has ruled the word stop to be an exclusively English term when used for stop signs. Accordingly, to comply with the Official Languages Act, only bilingual stop signs with both English and French (i.e.: stop and arrêt) are used on federally-regulated sites such as airports and entry points run by the Canada Border Services Agency (CBSA).

Canada is the only country which uses arrêt instead of stop in the French-speaking world.

In Quebec, although all road signs must be in French legally, modern stop signs can be found with either arrêt or stop. Both words are considered valid French words by the Office québécois de la langue française (OQLF), a stance held by the agency since 1992. In practice, however, it can be empirically observed (for instance, with Google Street View) that arrêt predominates in French-speaking areas (i.e., most of the geographic extent of Quebec), while stop can be found in majority English-speaking areas such as Montreal's West Island suburbs. At the time of the debates surrounding the adoption of the Charter of the French Language ("Bill 101") in 1977, the usage of stop on the older dual-word signs was considered to be English and therefore controversial; some signs were occasionally vandalised with red spray paint to turn the word stop into "101".

== MUTCDC road signs ==
The following below is a gallery of diagrams of traffic signs from the Manual of Uniform Traffic Control Devices for Canada (MUTCDC), which is the base standard for different road sign standards across all Canadian provinces.

=== Gallery of stop signs ===
Stop (English)

Stop (French)

Stop (English and French)

Stop (French and English)

Stop (Inuktitut and English)

Stop (Cree)

Stop (Cree and French)

Stop (Cree, English, and French)

=== Gallery of other signs ===
Alphanumeric reference IDs from the Manual of Uniform Traffic Control Devices for Canada are included, as well as some presumably from other sources.

RA-2
Yield

RA-3
School crossing

RA-4
Pedestrian crossing

RA-5
Overhead pedestrian crossing

RA-6
Railway crossing

RB-1
Maximum speed limit (federal standard)
(ex: 50 km/h)

RB-11L
No right turn

RB-11R
No left turn

RB-14L
Left turn required

RB-14R
Right turn required

RB-15
Must proceed straight only, turns prohibited

RB-22
Wrong way

RB-23
No entry

RB-61
Truck route

RB-62
No trucks

WA-1L
Turn to left

WA-1R
Turn to right

WA-3L
Curve to left

WA-3R
Curve to right

WA-4L
Reverse turn to left

WA-4R
Reverse turn to right

WA-5L
Reverse curve to left

WA-5R
Reverse curve to right

WA-6L
Multiple curves to left

WA-6R
Multiple curves to right

WA-8
End of road

WA-8
Sharp curve marker

WA-8
T-junction marker

WA-10
Advisory speed limit

WA-11
Crossroad

WA-13
Side road intersection

WA-14
T-junction

WA-15
Y-junction

WA-16
Merging traffic

WA-18
Railway crossing ahead

WA-18L
Skewed railway crossing ahead

WA-18R
Skewed railway crossing ahead

WA-19
Railway crossing on side road ahead

WA-20
Railway crossing on side road ahead

WA-21
Steep descent

WA-23
Road narrows ahead

WA-24
Narrow bridge ahead

WA-26
Height restriction ahead

WA-27
Height restriction marker

WA-31
Divided highway begins

WA-32
Divided highway ends

WA-33L
Left lane ends

WA-33R
Right lane ends

WA-35
Added lane

WB-1
Stop sign ahead

WB-2
Yield sign ahead

WB-3
Two-way traffic ahead

WC-1
School zone

WC-2
Pedestrian crossing ahead

WC-3
Playground

WC-8L
Heavy vehicles entering from left

WC-8R
Heavy vehicles entering from right

WC-14
Moose crossing

WC-22
Animal-drawn vehicle crossing

RA-009A/Cross other side

RB-055A/No stopping

RB-040/No trucks over 6.5 m

RB-80/Advanced green when flashing

WA-30/Opening bridge + WA-30t/Opening bridge plaque

== Nova Scotia road signs ==
No lane change

No lane change (straight)

No lane change (this lane)

End no lane change

End school area tab

End school area

Wrong way

Through traffic keep right

Do not pass here to crosswalk

Maximum 30 km/h when children present

== British Columbia road signs ==
British Columbia maintains its own equivalent standard to the MUTCDC, the "Manual of Standard Traffic Signs and Pavement Markings".

This sign is posted after the Canada–US border to remind US drivers that Canada uses the metric system.
The imperial speed limit (left) is a BC-style sign, rather than an MUTCD-standard one as would be used in the US.

Stop

Yield

Maximum speed limit

Do not enter

Wrong way

No left turn

No right turn

Left turn required

Right turn required

Straight ahead only

No right turn on red signal

No trucks

Truck route

School zone

School zone speed limit

Pedestrian crossing ahead

Pedestrian crossing

School crossing

Playground

Curve to left

Curve to right

Turn to left

Turn to right

Reverse curve to left

Reverse curve to right

Multiple curves to left

Multiple curves to right

Crossroad

Side road intersection

T-junction

Y-junction

Railway crossing ahead

Skewed railway crossing ahead

Skewed railway crossing ahead

Railway crossing on side road ahead

Railway crossing on side road ahead

Stop sign ahead

End of road

Sharp curve marker

T-junction marker

Height restriction ahead

Height restriction marker

Two-way traffic ahead

Advisory speed limit

Road narrows ahead

Steep descent

Added lane

Merging traffic

Divided highway ends

Narrow bridge ahead

Left lane ends

Right lane ends

Moose crossing

== New Brunswick road signs ==
The Department of Transportation and Infrastructure issues a Sign Manual based on the MUTCDC.

Stop

Right turn required

Left turn required

No right turn

No left turn

Proceed straight ahead

Wrong way

No right turn on red signal

Truck route

No trucks

Pedestrian crossing ahead

Pedestrian crossing

Press button to cross

Overhead pedestrian crossing

School zone

School crossing

Playground

Merging traffic

Added lane

Curve to right

Curve to left

Turn to right

Turn to left

Reverse turn to right

Reverse turn to left

Reverse curve to right

Reverse curve to left

Multiple curves to left

Multiple curves to right

Advisory speed limit

Crossroad

Side road intersection

End of road

T-junction marker

Sharp curve marker

Road narrows ahead

Narrow bridge ahead

Left lane ends

Right lane ends

Divided highway begins

Divided highway ends

Two-way traffic ahead

Height restriction ahead

Height restriction marker

Railway crossing ahead

Skewed railway crossing ahead

Skewed railway crossing ahead

Railway crossing on side road ahead

Railway crossing on side road ahead

Heavy vehicles entering from right

Heavy vehicles entering from left

Steep descent

Moose crossing

Animal-drawn vehicle crossing

== Alberta Road Signs ==
Most signs in Alberta are defined by the Alberta traffic control standards, which is based on the MUTCDC.

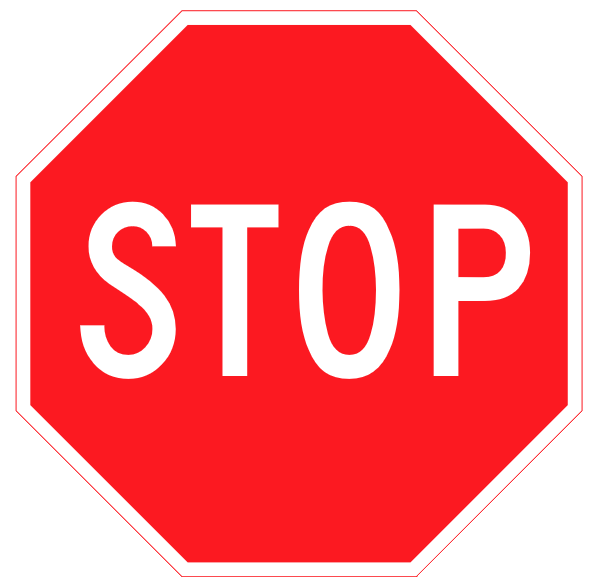
Stop sign

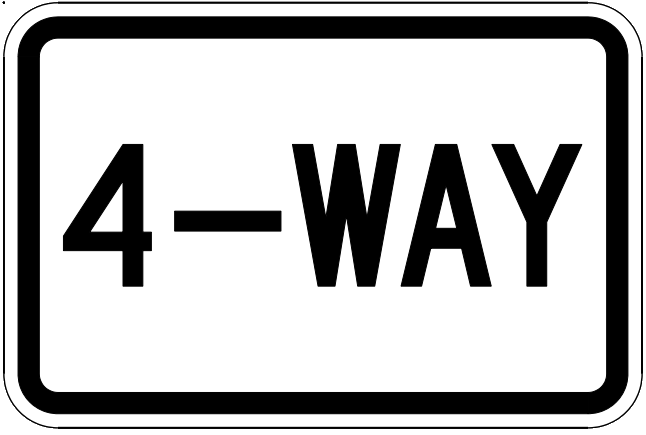
4-way stop sign tab

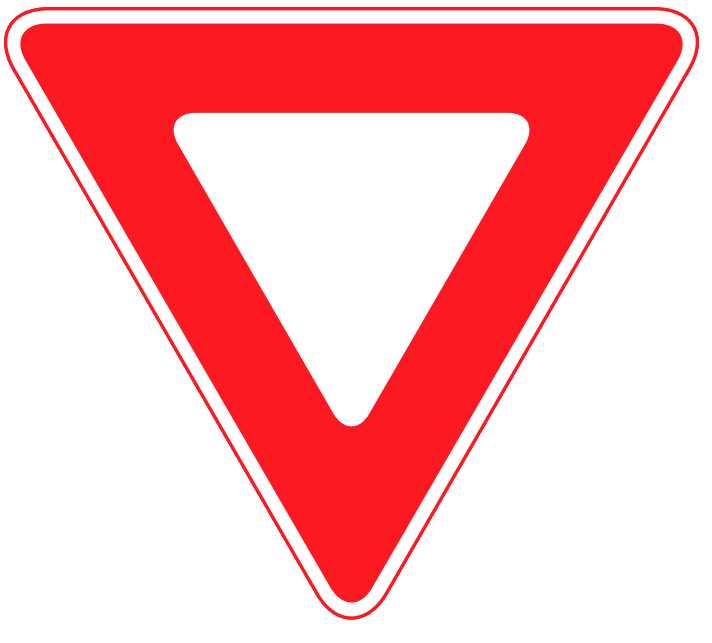
Yield sign.

== Manitoba Road Signs ==
Most signs in Manitoba follow the MUTCDC.

All traffic turns left.

No right on red signals.

Reduced speed ahead. This sign is for a school zone.

Maximum speed limit

No right turning on times/dates listed.

Parking prohibited aside for disabled people.

Pedestrian corridor ahead.

Maximum speed change ahead.

Traffic turns left.

Do not pass.

All traffic must turn right.

Do not enter sign

Truck route.

No trucks allowed.

Very sharp right ahead.

Divided highway ahead.

Divided highway ends ahead.

Winding road ahead.

Pedestrian crosswalk ahead.

Two way traffic ahead.

Left lane ends.

Road ends ahead.

Right lane ends.

Bumps ahead.

School crossing ahead.

Merging roadways ahead.

Bridge ices at freezing temperatures.

Steep hill ahead.

Narrow bridge ahead.

Hazard marker.

Playground ahead.

Traffic signals ahead.

Traffic island ahead.

Pavement ends.

Maximum speed on exit.

Reserved bus lane ahead.

Maximum speed changes ahead.

Reserved median lane ahead.

Reserved lane ahead.

Prepare to stop.

== Ontario road signs ==
The Ministry of Transportation of Ontario (MTO) also has historically used its own MUTCD which bore many similarities to the TAC MUTCDC. However, as of approximately 2000, MTO has been developing the Ontario Traffic Manual (OTM), a series of smaller volumes each covering different aspects of traffic control (e.g., sign design principles).

=== Sign classification ===
The Ontario Traffic Manual Committee categorises all road signs into two main categories: highway and non-highway sign types. Signs are then sub-categorised into two additional groups: urban and rural.

=== Examples of Ontario regulatory and warning road signs ===
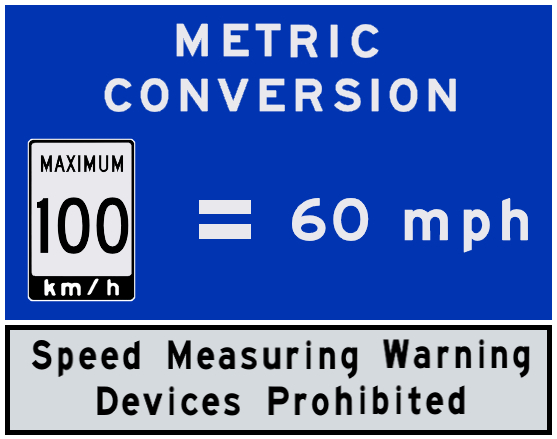
A blue metric reminder signage used in Ontario, Canada is seen near the US borders.

Stop

Yield

Pedestrian crossing

Maximum speed limit

School zone speed limit

No left turn

No right turn

No right turn or straight ahead

No left turn or straight ahead

No turns

Do not enter

Do not enter, wrong way

Truck route

No trucks

Turn to left

Turn to right

Curve to left

Curve to right

Reverse turn to left

Reverse turn to right

Reverse curve to left

Reverse curve to right

Multiple curves to left

Multiple curves to right

End of road

Sharp curve marker

T-junction marker

Crossroad

Crossroad with minor road

Side road intersection

Side road intersection with minor road

T-junction

Y-junction

Y-junction on left

Y-junction on right

Merging traffic

Steep descent

Left lane ends

Right lane ends

Narrow bridge ahead

Height restriction ahead

Height restriction marker

Road narrows ahead

Advisory speed limit

Divided highway begins

Divided highway ends

Stop sign ahead

Two-way traffic ahead

School zone

School crossing

Playground

Railway crossing ahead

Pedestrian crossing ahead

Heavy vehicles entering from left

Heavy vehicles entering from right

Moose crossing

Animal-drawn vehicle crossing

== Quebec road signs ==
The following are samples of Quebec road signs. A notable difference between Quebec road signs and those of the rest of Canada is Quebec's use of a white chevron on a red background to mark road alignment around a curve, whereas the remainder of the country employs a black chevron on a yellow background.

=== Quebec gallery ===
The logo for the Ministère des Transports et de la Mobilité durable (English: Ministry of Transport and Sustainable Mobility).

Metric signage reminder in Quebec, posted near US border and at major airports
The imperial speed limit (left) is a Quebec-style sign, rather than an MUTCD-standard one as would be used in the US

Arrêt (Translation: STOP)

Yield sign

Do not enter

Maximum speed (50 km/h)

Straight ahead only

Left turn required

Right turn required

No left turn

No right turn

No right turn on red signal

Truck route

No trucks

School crossing

Pedestrian crossing

Stop ahead

Two-way traffic ahead

Divided highway begins

Divided highway ends

Turn to left

Turn to right

Curve to left

Curve to right

Reverse turn to right

Reverse turn to left

Reverse curve to left

Reverse curve to right

Multiple curves to left

Multiple curves to right

Advisory speed limit

Merging traffic

Added lane

Crossroad

T-junction

Side road intersection

Y-junction

Railway crossing ahead

Skewed railway crossing ahead

Skewed railway crossing ahead

Railway crossing on side road ahead

Height restriction ahead

Height restriction marker

Narrow bridge ahead

Road narrows ahead

Steep descent

School zone

Pedestrian crossing ahead

Playground

Moose crossing

End of road

== Retired signs ==
These signs have been superseded but can still be seen in some places.

Stop through highway (Ontario) (1955)

Yield (Ontario) (1955)

Yield (Ontario) (1962)

School crossing (Blue on white) (Ontario) (1955)

School crossing (White on blue) (Ontario) (1955)

Railway crossing (Ontario) (1955)

Railway crossing (1960-1970s)

Railway crossing (1970s-1980s)

Speed limit (Ontario) (1955)

Maximum speed limit (Ontario) (1960)

Suburban district speed limit (Ontario) (1960)

Turn to left (Ontario) (1955)

Turn to right (Ontario) (1955)

Curve to left (Ontario) (1955)

Curve to right (Ontario) (1955)

Reverse curve to left (Ontario) (1955)

Reverse curve to right (Ontario) (1955)

T-junction (Ontario) (1955)

Y-junction on left (Ontario) (1955)

Y-junction on right (Ontario) (1955)

Railway crossing ahead (Ontario) (1955)

Railway crossing ahead (1968-1975)

Stop sign ahead (Ontario) (1968)

School ahead (Ontario) (blue on white) (1955)

School ahead (Ontario) (white on blue) (1955)

School zone (Ontario) (1960)

School zone (1960–1982)

School zone (1982–2007)

School zone speed limit (Ontario) (1960)

== See also ==
- Comparison of traffic signs in English-speaking countries
- Crosswalks in North America
- Glossary of road transport terms
- Road signs in the United States
- Traffic sign
- Warning sign
