= Road signs in Puerto Rico =

Map showing state adoption of the 2009 edition of the Manual on Uniform Traffic Control Devices: Adopted national MUTCD Adopted national MUTCD with state supplement Adopted state-specific MUTCD

Road signs in Puerto Rico are regulated in the Manual de Rotulación para las Vías Públicas de Puerto Rico, Puerto Rico’s supplement to the Manual on Uniform Traffic Control Devices (MUTCD), the standard for road signs, signals, and markings in the United States. It is developed by the Puerto Rico Highways and Transportation Authority (PRHTA) "in substantial conformance to" the national MUTCD developed by the Federal Highway Administration.

The first edition of the Manual de Rotulación para las Vías Públicas de Puerto Rico was published in 1979. This manual was most recently updated in 2020. Puerto Rico is among the territories of the United States to have adopted the national MUTCD in conjunction with a supplemental volume. The inscriptions on road signs are written in Spanish since it is an official language of Puerto Rico and is most widely spoken in Puerto Rico.

The suffix (D) in parentheses means "right", from Spanish derecha, while the (I) in parentheses means "left", from Spanish izquierda.

== Regulatory signs ==
=== R1 series: Stop and yield ===
R1-1
Stop sign

R1-2
Yield

R1-3
4-Way (plaque)

R1-5 (D)
Yield here to pedestrians (right)

R1-5 (I)
Yield here to pedestrians (left)

R1-6a
Bus stop

=== R2 series: Speed limit ===
R2-1
50 mph speed limit

R2-2a
40 mph heavy vehicle speed limit

R2-3
Electronic Toll Collection Speed Limit

R2-4a
Combined Speed Limit

R2-6a
End Speed Zone

=== R3 series: Lane usage and turns ===
R3-1
No right turn

R3-2
No left turn

R3-3
No turns

R3-4
No U-turn

R3-5 (I)
Left turn only

R3-5 (D)
Right turn only

R3-5a
Straight through only

R3-6 (I)
Optional movement lane control, straight through and left turn

R3-6 (D)
Optional movement lane control, straight through and right turn

R3-7 (I)
Left lane must turn left

R3-7 (D)
Right lane must turn right

R3-8
Advance intersection lane control (two lanes)

R3-8c
Advance intersection lane control (two lanes)

R3-9a
Reversible lane control, use only X AM to X PM

R3-9e
Reversible lane control, use X AM to X PM, do not use in other hours

R3-9f
Reversible lane control, do not use X AM to X PM

R3-10a
Bus lane (post-mounted)

R3-17
Bike lane

R3-17a
Bike lane ahead (plaque)

R3-17b
Bike lane ends (plaque)

R3-18
No U or left turn

R3-29
Autoexpreso ETC vehicles only

=== R4 series: Regulation of movement ===
R4-3
Slower traffic and trucks keep Right

R4-7
Keep right

R4-8
Keep left

R4-9
Stay in lane

R4-19
Keep right except to pass

=== R5 series: Exclusionary ===
R5-1
Do not enter

R5-1a
Wrong way

R5-1b
Wrong way (cyclists)

R5-2
No trucks

R5-6
No bicycles

R5-10a
No pedestrians, bicycles

=== R6 series: One way and divided highway ===
R6-1 (D)
One way

R6-1 (I)
One way

R6-2 (D)
One way, alternate

R6-2 (I)
One way, alternate

R6-4
Chevron roundabout directional

R6-4a
Chevron roundabout (three chevrons)

R6-4b
Chevron roundabout (four chevrons)

R6-5P
Roundabout

=== R7 series: Parking ===
R7-1
No parking any time

R7-2
No Parking X AM TO X PM

R7-2a
No Parking X AM TO X PM (alternative)

R7-3
No parking except Sundays and Holidays

R7-3a
No parking except Sundays and Holidays (alternative)

R7-3b
No parking except Sundays and Holidays (alternative)

R7-4
No standing any time

R7-5
No parking from here to corner

R7-6
No parking, loading zone

R7-7
No parking, bus stop

R7-8
Reserved parking (wheelchair)

R7-8a
Bus accessible (plaque)

R7-9
No parking bike lane

R7-10
No parking/loading zone X AM TO X PM

R7-11
No parking X AM TO X PM/Loading zone X AM TO X PM

R7-12
No parking/loading zone X AM TO X AM, X PM TO X PM

R7-13
No parking X AM TO X PM/Jitneys X AM TO X PM

R7-14
No parking, taxi stand

R7-15
No parking, Jitney stand

R7-16
No parking X AM TO X PM Jitney stand

R7-17
No parking X AM TO X PM Bus Stop

R7-107a
No parking, bus stop

R7-108
Two hour parking time

R7-108a (D)
Two hour parking time

R7-108a (I)
Two hour parking time

R7-200
No parking on the left and one hour parking time on the right (combined)

R7-201
Tow away zone

R7-201a
Tow away zone

=== R8 series: Parking and emergency restrictions ===
R8-3a
No parking

R8-4
Emergency parking only

=== R9 series: Bicycles and pedestrians ===
R9-3a
No pedestrians

R9-3b (D)
Use crosswalk (plaque)

R9-3b (I)
Use crosswalk (plaque)

R9-3b (PR) (I)
Use bridge (plaque)

R9-3b (PR) (D)
Use bridge (plaque)

R9-6a
Yield to pedestrians

R9-7
Shared-use path restriction

=== R10 series: Traffic signal ===
R10-6
Stop here on red

R10-7
Do not block intersection

R10-11
No turn on red

R10-12
Left turn yield on green signal

=== R11 series: Road closed ===
R11-2
Road closed

R11-3
Street closed

R11-3a
Road closed - local traffic only

R11-3b
Bridge closed - local traffic only

R11-3b (PR)
Bridge closed - local traffic only

R11-3c
Bridge closed

=== R12 series: Weight limits ===
R12-1
Weight limit 10 tons

R12-5
Weight limit

R12-7
Emergency vehicle weight limit

R12-7a
Axle weight limit

=== R14 series: Truck routes ===
R14-2
Hazardous material route

R14-3
Hazardous material prohibited

R14-4
National Network Route

R14-5
National Network prohibited

=== R16 series: Seat belts and headlight use ===
R16-1
Wear seat belt

R16-1p
Wear seat belt (text plate)

R16-2
$1000 fine for littering

== School signs ==
S1-1
School zone ahead (also used for pedestrian crosswalks near schools)

S3-1
School bus stop ahead

S3-2
School bus turn ahead

S4-5
School speed limit zone ahead

S5-1(15)
School speed limit when flashing (15 mph)

S5-1(25)
School speed limit when flashing (25 mph)

S5-2
End school zone (usually under an R2 speed limit sign)

W16-5p (D)
Supplemental arrow to the right (plaque)

W16-5p (I)
Supplemental arrow to the left (plaque)

W16-6p (D)
Supplemental arrow to the right (plaque)

W16-6p (I)
Supplemental arrow to the left (plaque)

W16-7p (D)
Downward diagonal arrow to the right (plaque)

W16-7p (I)
Downward diagonal arrow to the left (plaque)

W16-9p
Ahead

== Warning signs ==
=== W1 series: Horizontal alignment ===
W1-1 (D)
Turn right

W1-1 (I)
Turn left

W1-1a (D)
Turn right (25 mph speed limit)

W1-1a (I)
Turn left (25 mph speed limit)

W1-2
Curve

W1-2a (D)
Curve right (35 mph speed limit)

W1-3 (D)
Reverse turn, first to the right

W1-3 (I)
Reverse turn, first to the left

W1-4 (D)
Reverse curve, first to the right

W1-4 (I)
Reverse curve, first to the right

CW1-4 (D)
One lane shift (right)

CW1-4 (I)
One lane shift (left)

CW1-4b (D)
Two lane shift (right)

CW1-4b (I)
Two lane shift (left)

CW1-4c (D)
Three lane shift (right)

CW1-4c (I)
Three lane shift (left)

W1-5 (D)
Winding road, first to the right

W1-5 (I)
Winding road, first to the left

W1-6 (D)
Arrow

W1-6 (I)
Arrow

W1-7
Two-direction large arrow

W1-8 (D)
Right chevron

W1-8 (I)
Left chevron

W1-10 (D)
Curve right with side road

W1-10 (I)
Curve left with side road

W1-11 (I)
Hairpin curve to the left

W1-11 (D)
Hairpin curve to the right

W1-13
Truck rollover warning

W1-15
270 degree loop curve

=== W2 series: Intersections ===
W2-1
Crossroad

W2-2 (D)
Side road right

W2-2 (I)
Side road left

W2-3 (D)
Slanted side road right

W2-3 (I)
Slanted side road left

W2-4
T-intersection

W2-5
Y-intersection

W2-6
Roundabout

=== W3 series: Advance traffic control ===
W3-1
Stop sign ahead

W3-1a
Stop sign ahead (plate, text only)

W3-2
Yield sign ahead

W3-2
Yield sign ahead (plate, text only)

W3-3
Traffic lights ahead

W3-3a
Traffic lights ahead (text only)

CW3-4
Be prepared to stop

W3-5
Speed limit ahead

=== W4 series: Lanes and merges ===
W4-1 (D)
Merge from the right

W4-1 (I)
Merge from the right

W4-2 (D)
Lane ends on the right

W4-2 (I)
Lane ends on the left

W4-3 (D)
Added right lane

W4-3 (I)
Added left lane

W4-5
Merge (entering roadway)

W4-6
Added right lane (entering roadway)

=== W5 series: Road width restrictions ===
W5-1
Road narrows

W5-2
Narrow bridge

W5-3
One lane bridge

W5-4
Path narrows

=== W6 series: Divided highway ===
W6-1
Divided highway starts

W6-2
Divided highway ends

W6-3
Two-way traffic

=== W7 series: Hills ===
W7-1
Steep grade/hill

W7-3a
Downhill next XX km

W7-3b
Test the brakes

W7-4
Runaway truck ramp ahead

W7-4b
Runaway truck ramp (right)

=== W8 series: Pavement and roadway conditions ===
W8-1
Bump

W8-2
Dip

W8-5
Slippery when wet ahead

W8-6
Trucks crossing

W8-6a
Trucks entering and exiting

W8-15p
Motorcycles

W8-16
Metal bridge deck

W8-17 (D)
Dangerous shoulder on the right

W8-17 (I)
Dangerous shoulder on the left

W8-17p
Uneven shoulder

W8-18
Flood zone ahead

W8-19
Flood gauge

W8-25
Shoulder ends

=== W9 series: Lane transitions ===
CW9-3
Center lane closed ahead

CW9-3 (D)
Right lane closed ahead

CW9-3 (I)
Left lane closed ahead

CW9-3a
Interior lane shift ahead

=== W11 series: Advance warnings ===
W11-1
Bicycle

W11-2
Pedestrians

W11-4
Cattle

W11-8
Emergency vehicle

W11-8p
Fire station (plate)

W11-10
Truck

W11-10p
Truck crossing (plate)

W11-11
Possibility of cattle on the run-in

W11-15
Bicycle and pedestrians

=== W12 series: Low Clearance Warnings ===
W12-1
Double arrow

W12-2
Low clearance

W12-2
Low clearance (metric)

W12-2p
Clearance advisory

W12-2p
Clearance advisory (metric)

=== W13 series: Advisory speeds ===
W13-1
Speed advisory

W13-2
Exit speed advisory

=== W14 series: Dead end streets and no passing zones ===
W14-1
Dead end

W14-2
No outlet

W14-2a
Road ends

W14-3
No passing zone

=== W15 series: Playgrounds ===
W15-1
Playground

=== W16 series: Supplemental plaques ===
W16-1
Share the road (plaque)

W16-2
XXX metres

W16-2a
XXX m

W16-5p (D)
Supplemental arrow to the right (plaque)

W16-5p (I)
Supplemental arrow to the left (plaque)

W16-6p (D)
Supplemental arrow to the right (plaque)

W16-6p (I)
Supplemental arrow to the left (plaque)

W16-7p (D)
Downward diagonal arrow to the right (plaque)

W16-7p (I)
Downward diagonal arrow to the left (plaque)

W16-9p
Ahead

W16-19
Bicycle crossing (plaque)

=== W17 series: Speed humps ===
W17-1
Speed hump

W17-2
Landslide

W17-3a
Grooved shoulder

W17-3ap
Grooved shoulder (plate)

W17-3b
Grooves in center

W17-3bp
Grooves in center (plate)

=== W20 series: Work zones ===
CW20-1
Road under construction ahead

CW20-2
Detour ahead

CW20-3
Road closed ahead

CW20-3a
Street closed

CW20-4
One lane road ahead

CW20-5 (D)
Right lane closed ahead

CW20-5 (I)
Left lane closed ahead

CW20-5a (D)
2 right lanes closed

CW20-5a (I)
2 left lanes closed

CW20-6
One lane ahead

CW20-7
Flagger ahead (text sign)

CW20-7a
Flagger ahead (symbol sign)

CW20-8
Bridge under construction ahead

=== W21 series: Road work ===
CW21-1a
Workers (symbol sign)

CW21-3
Road machinery ahead

CW21-4
Road work ahead

CW21-5
Shoulder work ahead

CW21-5b (D)
Right shoulder closed

CW21-5b (I)
Left shoulder closed

CW21-5d
Bridge work ahead

=== W24 series: Lane shifts ===
CW24-1 (D)
Double reverse curve (right) (1 lane)

CW24-1 (I)
Double reverse curve (left) (1 lane)

CW24-1a (D)
Double reverse curve (right) (2 lanes)

CW24-1a (I)
Double reverse curve (left) (2 lanes)

CW24-1b (D)
Double reverse curve (right) (3 lanes)

CW24-1b (I)
Double reverse curve (left) (3 lanes)

=== Object markers ===
OM-3 (D)
Right object marker

OM-3 (I)
Left object marker

== Construction information signs ==
G20-1
Road under construction next XX kms

G20-2
End construction

G20-2a
End road work

G20-4
Pilot car follow me

== Route marker signs ==
=== M1 series: Route shields ===
M1-6a
Primary Route marker (2 digits)

M1-6b
Urban Primary Route marker (2 digits)

M1-6c
Secondary Route marker

M1-6d
Tertiary Route marker

=== M2 series: Junction markers ===
M2-1
Junction

M2-2
Combination junction

=== M3 series: Cardinal direction markers ===
M3-1
North

M3-2
East

M3-3
South

M3-4
West

=== M4 series: Route marker auxiliaries ===
M4-5
To

M4-6
End

M4-8
Detour

M4-8
End detour

=== M5 series: Advance turn arrow auxiliary signs ===
M5-1 (D)
Advance Right Turn Arrow (90 Degree Angle)

M5-1 (I)
Advance Left Turn Arrow (90 Degree Angle)

M5-2 (D)
Advance Right Turn Arrow (45 Degree Angle)

M5-2 (I)
Advance Left Turn Arrow (45 Degree Angle)

M5-3 (I)
Advance Left Turn Arrow (Circular Intersection)

=== M6 series: Directional arrow auxiliary signs ===
M6-1 (D)
Right Directional Arrow

M6-1 (I)
Left Directional Arrow

M6-2 (D)
Diagonal Right Directional Arrow

M6-2 (I)
Diagonal Left Directional Arrow

M6-2a (D)
Downward Diagonal Right Directional Arrow

M6-2a (I)
Downward Diagonal Left Directional Arrow

M6-3
Straight Directional Arrow

M6-4
Double Directional Arrow

M6-5 (D)
Double Diagonal Right Directional Arrow

M6-5 (I)
Double Diagonal Left Directional Arrow

M6-6 (D)
Straight And Right Directional Arrow

M6-6 (I)
Left And Straight Directional Arrow

M6-7 (D)
Straight And Diagonal Right Directional Arrow

M6-7 (I)
Diagonal Left And Straight Directional Arrow

== Destination signs ==
=== D1 series: Destination ===
D1-1
Destination (1 line)

D1-1a
Destination and distance (1 line)

D1-2
Destination (2 lines)

D1-2a
Destination and distance (2 lines)

D1-2d
Circular intersection destination (2 lines)

D1-3
Destination (3 lines)

D1-3a
Destination and distance (3 lines)

D1-3b
Combination destination and distance (2 lines) / destination

D1-3d
Circular intersection destination (3 lines)

=== D2 series: Distance ===
D2-1
Distance (1 line)

D2-2
Distance (2 lines)

D2-2a
Distance (2 lines)

D2-3
Distance (3 lines)

=== D3 series: Street name ===
D3
Street name (2 lines)

D3-1
Street name (1 line)

=== D4 series: Parking ===
D4-1
Parking area

D4-3 (I)
Bicycle parking area (left)

D4-3 (D)
Bicycle parking area (right)

=== D5 series: Rest area ===
D5-1
Rest area XX kilometers

D5-2
Rest Area (with arrow)

=== D6 series: Scenic area ===
D6-1
Scenic area

D6-2
Scenic area XX Kilometers

D6-3
Scenic area

=== D9 series: Motorist services ===
D9-2
Hospital

D9-7
Gasoline

D9-9
Lodging

=== D10 series: Reference location ===
D10-1
Reference Location (1 digit)

D10-1a
Intermediate Reference Location (2 digits)

D10-2
Reference Location (2 digits)

D10-2a
Intermediate Reference Location (3 digits)

D10-3
Reference Location (3 digits)

D10-3a
Intermediate Reference Location (4 digits)

=== D11 series: Bicycle facility and shared-use path ===
D11-1
Bike lane

D11-1a
Bicycles permitted

D11-1bP
Bike route (plaque)

== General information ==
I-5
Principal Airport

I-8
Library

I-9
Vehicle Ferry Terminal

I-10
Moscoso Bridge

I-15
Race Track

== Emergency management signs ==
EM-1a
Tsunami evacuation route

EM-1b
Tsunami danger zone

EM-1d
Tsunami zone

M4-6
Leaving tsunami danger zone

M4-14
Entering tsunami danger zone
