= Road signs in Thailand =

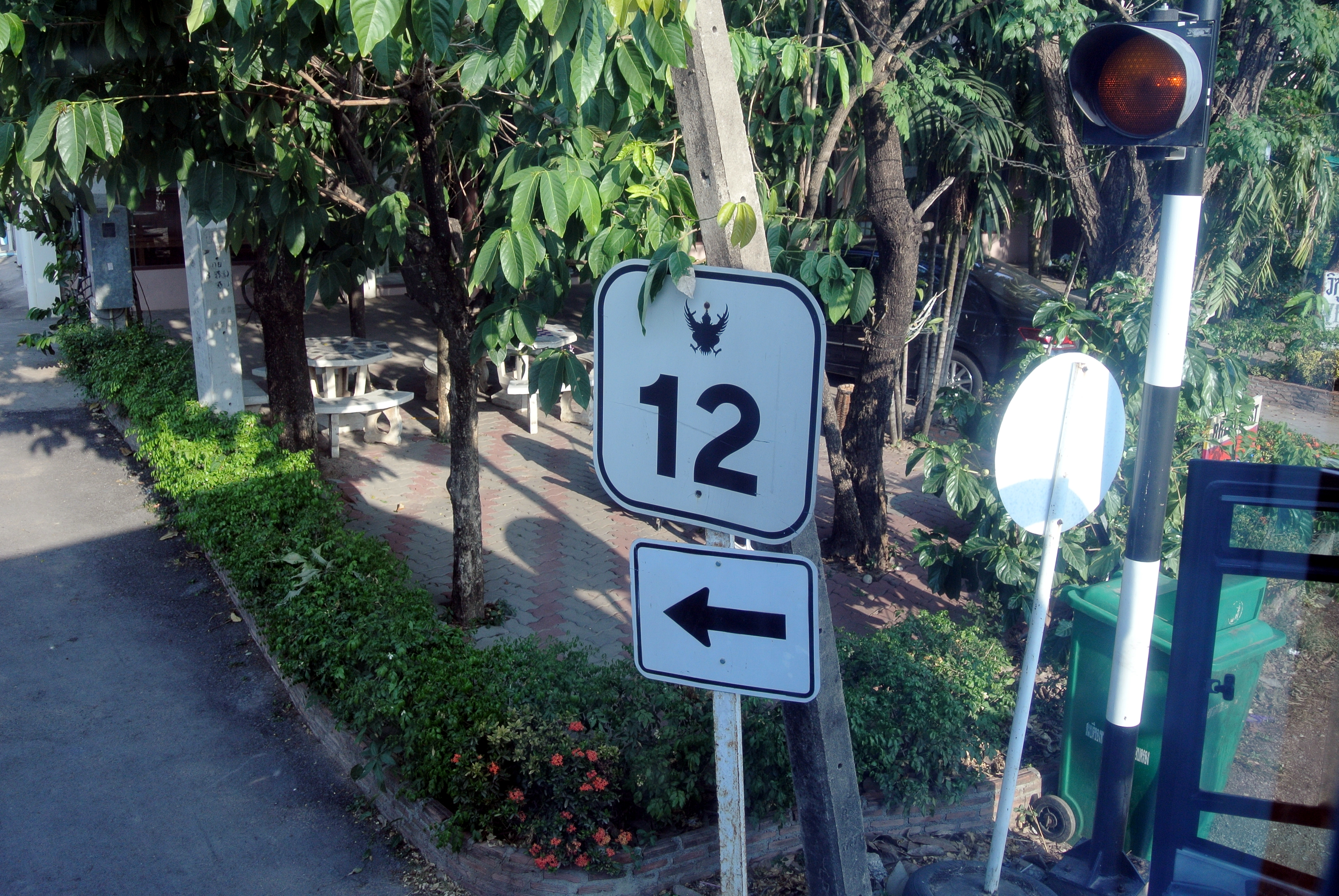
Sign on Route 12 in the north of the country

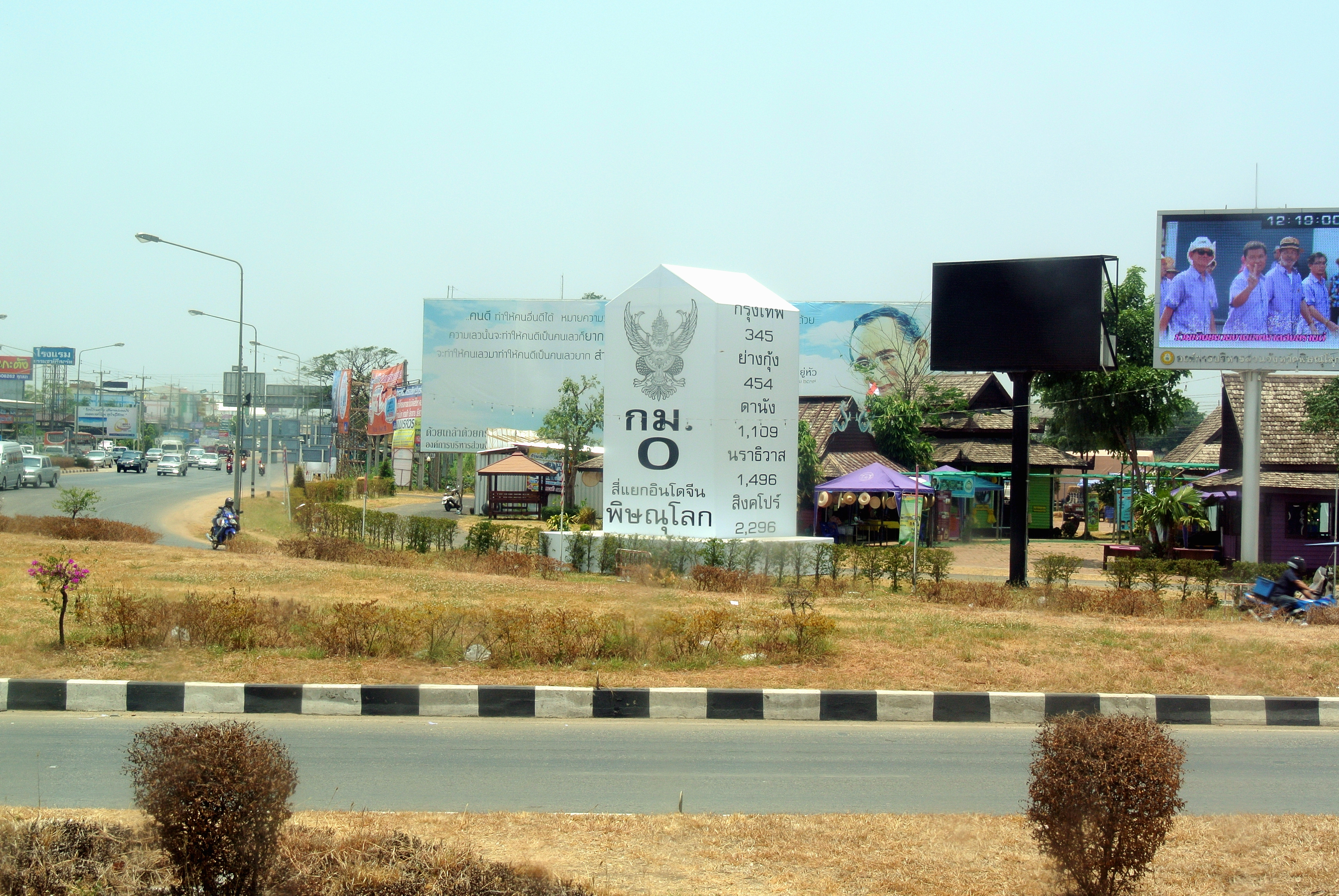
A kilometer zero stone in northern Thailand

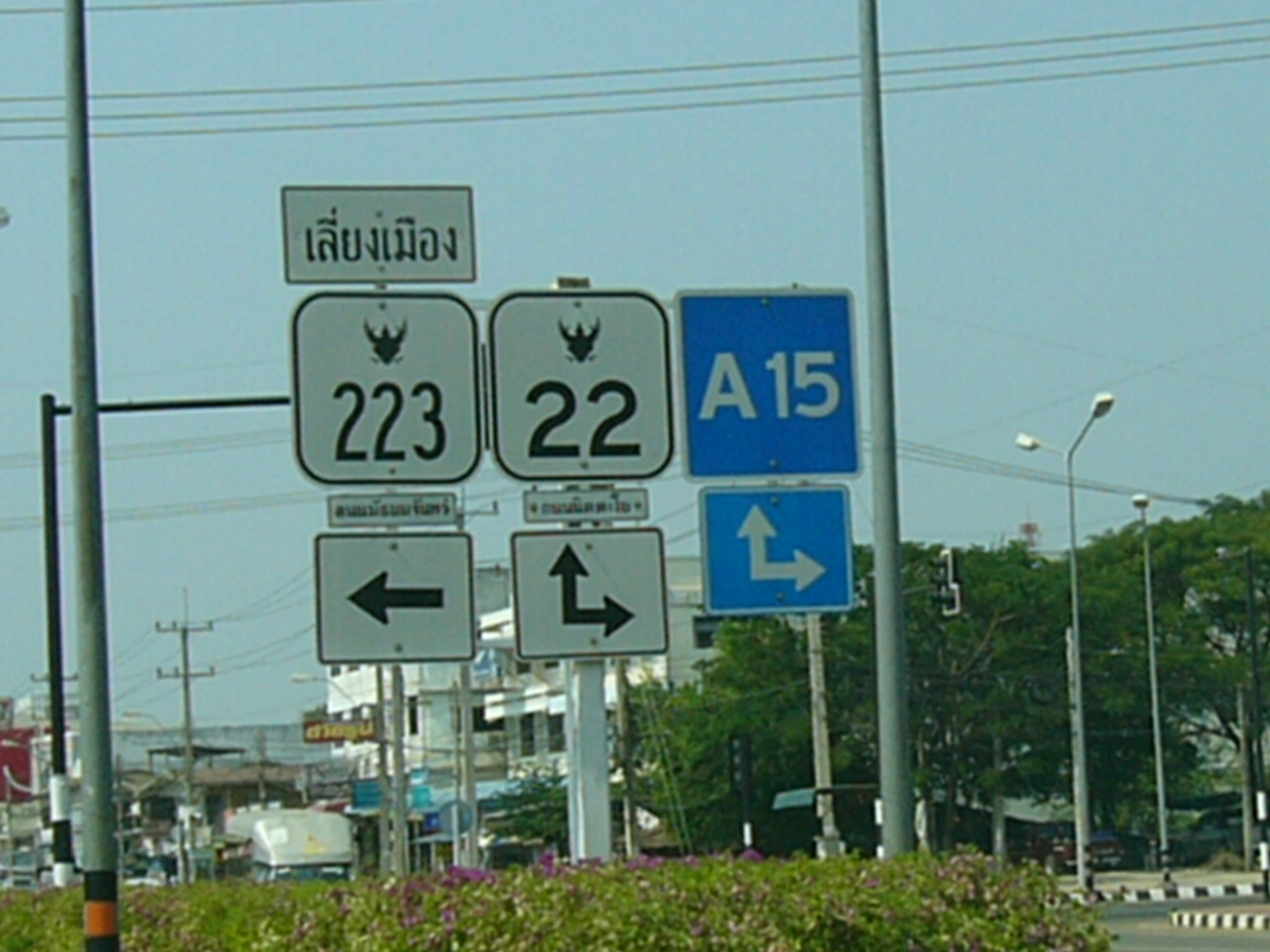
Highway road signs in (northeastern) Thailand

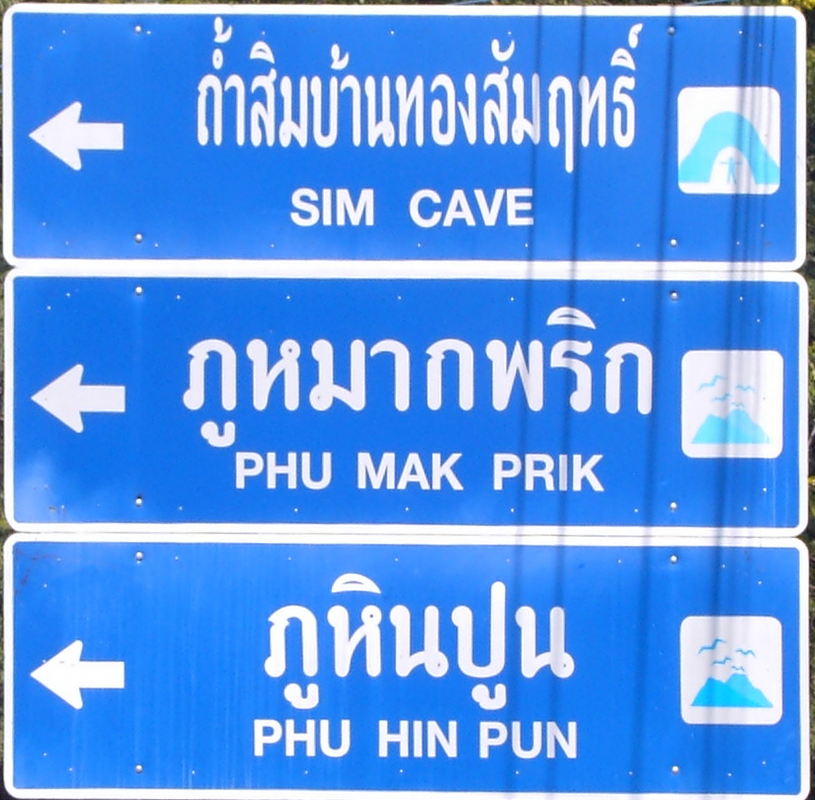
A directional board

Road signs in Thailand are standardized road signs similar to those used in other nations but much of it resembles road signage systems used in South American countries with certain differences, such as using a blue circle instead of a red-bordered white circle to indicate mandatory actions. Until the early 1980s, Thailand closely followed American, European, Australian, and Japanese practices in road sign design, with diamond-shaped warning signs and circular restrictive signs to regulate traffic. The Department of Railway maintains a standard on the typeface used in the sign, with custom made type for Thai text, unofficially named "Thang Luang" (อักษรทางหลวง) and a small derivation of FHWA Series fonts ("Highway Gothic") typeface, which is used on American road signage, for Latin text. In most Bangkok Metropolitan Area's routes, TS Lopburi is still used.

Thai traffic signs use Thai, the national language of Thailand, and distances and other measurements are expressed in compliance with the International System of Units. However, English is also used for important public places such as tourist attractions, airports, railway stations, and immigration checkpoints. Both Thai and romanizations are used on directional signage.

Thailand is a signatory to the 1968 Vienna Convention on Road Signs and Signals, but has yet to fully ratify the convention.

== History ==
The first year for road signs in Thailand was largely unknown, but it can be dated back as far as the start of the 1920s.

Thailand is the first country in Asia to adopt MUTCD standard yellow diamond warning signs, in 1940. For regulatory signs, rectangular signs were first used and were similar in design to North America, but they have been replaced in the mid-1950s by European-style red-bordered white circle signs.

In 2004, mandatory signs were switched from South American design to European design.

== Regulatory signs ==
With the exception of the special shapes and designs used for Stop, Yield, and No Entry signs, mandatory signs (e.g., Must Turn Left) are round with a blue background, white border, and a white pictogram. Those which express a prohibition (e.g., No Left Turn) show the pictogram crossed out by a red diagonal bar. This is in accordance with the Vienna Convention on Road Signs and Signals (Type A variants).

=== Priority Signs ===
Stop (Thai language)

Stop (Thai and English language)

Give way (Thai language)

Give way (Thai and English languages)

Give way to oncoming vehicles (used at traffic bottleneck points)

=== Prohibitory or Restrictive Signs ===
No overtaking

No entry

No right U-turn

No left U-turn

No left turn

No right turn

No changing to left lane

No changing to right lane

No right turn nor right U-turn

No left Turn nor left U-turn

No cars

No trucks

No motorcycles

No trailers

No tuk-tuks

No tricycle

No bicycles

No carts

No tractors

No animal-drawn carts

No motor vehicles

No tricycle or bicycles and motorcycles.

No motorcycles or moto-rickshaws

No honking

No pedestrians

No parking

No stopping

Stop at checkpoint (e.g.: customs, police)

Stop at checkpoint (e.g.: customs, police) (Thai and English languages)

Speed limit (10 km/h)

Speed limit (15 km/h)

Speed limit (20 km/h)

Speed limit (25 km/h)

Speed limit (30 km/h)

Speed limit (40 km/h)

Speed limit (45 km/h)

Speed limit (50 km/h)

Speed limit (60 km/h)

Speed limit (70 km/h)

Speed limit (80 km/h)

Speed limit (90 km/h)

Speed limit (100 km/h)

Speed limit (110 km/h)

Speed limit (120 km/h)

Weight limit

Weight limit (Thai and English languages)

Maximum width

Maximum width (Thai and English languages)

Maximum height

Maximum height (Thai and English languages)

Maximum vehicle length (Thai language)

Maximum vehicle length (Thai and English languages)

=== Mandatory Signs ===
Go straight

Turn left

Turn right

Keep left

Keep right

Pass on either side

Turn left

Turn right

Turn left or right

Go straight or turn left

Go straight or turn right

Roundabout

Buses only

High occupancy vehicles only

Motorcycles only

Bicycles only

Pedestrians only

Minimum speed limit (30 km/h)

Minimum speed limit (40 km/h)

Minimum speed limit (50 km/h)

Minimum speed limit (60 km/h)

Minimum speed limit (70 km/h)

Minimum speed limit (80 km/h)

Minimum speed limit (90 km/h)

=== Other regulatory signs ===
Speed limit zone ends

Slow down

=== General regulatory signs ===
Speed limit sign (in Bangkok area)

Speed limit (In city – Bangkok, Pattaya and cities inbound)

Speed limit (Countryside – Bangkok, Pattaya and cities outbound)

Car speed rating

Car speed rating According to ministerial regulations, the speed of vehicles on designated national highways or rural roads is specified 2021

Speed control zone According to ministerial regulations, the speed of vehicles on designated national highways or rural roads is specified 2021

Vehicles are prohibited from using the expressway.

Prohibited on Expressways

Prohibited on Expressways

Prohibiting vehicles from using the special highway that is temporarily open (only 4-wheel vehicles, installed on Motorway 6)

Slow traffic keep left

Right lane passing only

All cars use low gears

Limited visibility, no overtaking

Wrong Way

Right lane only for U-turn

Left lane, turn left

Stop and wait for the signal here

Truck weight for rural roads

Truck weight for local highways

Determining truck weight for expressways

Do not burn garbage and other materials on highways.

Do not drive and park on the shoulder of the road. (installed on expressway)

Underpass prohibitions

Do not stopping in underpass any time

Entering a no lane change zone

No vehicles of any kind are allowed to drive on the shoulder (installed on toll roads/expressways).

=== Mandatory signs for bicycle paths ===
Cyclists must stop

Cyclist lane ahead

Cyclist lane ends

Cyclists stays to the left

=== Optional signs ===
Let the car on the right go first.

Let the cars in the roundabout go first.

Only trucks with 6 wheels or more.

Sign for additional mandatory hours for bus lanes.

Signs for additional times and required directions.

except buses

Starting point of the public bus lane

The end of the mass transit lane

Starting point of the motorcycle lane

End of the motorcycle lane

Always turn left

Always turn right

One way traffic

Stop and wait for the traffic light

== Warning signs ==
=== Curves and Turns ===
Curve to left

Curve to right

Sharp curve to left

Sharp curve to right

Double curve, first to left

Double curve, first to right

Sharp double curve, first to left

Sharp double curve, first to right

Winding road, first bend to left

Winding road, first bend to right

=== Intersections ===
Crossroads

Y-junction

Side road junction on left

Side road junction on right

Offset road junction, left and right

Offset road junction, left and right

Skewed side road junction on left

Skewed side road junction on right

Skewed side road junction on left

Skewed side road junction on right

T-junction

=== Roundabout ===
Roundabout

=== Road narrows ===
Road narrows on both sides

Road narrows on left side

Road narrows on right side

=== Narrow bridge ===
Narrow bridge

=== Lane transitions ===
Left lane ends

Right lane ends

=== Railway crossing ===
Railway crossing ahead that is not protected by automatic gates

Railway crossing ahead that is protected by automatic gates

Railway crossing on next side road ahead

Railway crossing (Crossbuck)

=== Lane width restrictions ===
Width restriction ahead (Thai language)

Width restriction ahead (Thai and English languages)

=== Lane height restrictions ===
Height restriction ahead (Thai language)

Height restriction ahead (Thai and English languages)

=== Hills and Grades ===
Steep climb

Steep descent

=== Lane conditions ===
Bump

Bumpy road

Dip

Slippery road

Loose road surface

Falling stone

=== Opening bridge ===
Opening bridge

=== Lane shiftings ===
Shift to left carriageway

Shift to right carriageway

Added lane ahead

Added lane ahead

=== Lane mergings ===
Left merging traffic

Right merging traffic

=== Divided highways ===
Divided road beginning

Divided road end

=== Turning back ===
U turn ahead Right

U turn ahead Left

=== Two-way traffic ===
Two-way traffic

=== Advance traffic control ===
Traffic signals ahead

Stop ahead (Thai language)

Stop ahead (Thai and English languages)

Give way ahead (Thai language)

Give way ahead (Thai and English languages)

Pedestrian crossing

Children

Cattle Crossing

Low-flying aircraft

Other danger (Thai language)

Other danger (Thai and English languages)

=== No passing zone ===
No overtaking zone

No overtaking zone (Thai and English languages)

=== Lane split, Curve and Hazard markers ===
Lane split

Diverge highway
Curve markers

Chervon to The left

Chervon to The right

Curve marker to right

Curve marker to left

Curve marker double arrow

Chevron marker to right

Chevron marker to left

Chevron marker double arrow
Hazard markers

Hazard marker or pass either side

Hazard marker or keep left

Hazard marker or keep right

=== Alternate merging ===
Zipper merge (Thai language)

Zipper merge (Thai and English languages)

=== Supplementary plates ===
City limit reduce speed (Thai language)

City limit reduce speed (Thai and English languages)

Winding road for next --- km

Steep climb for next --- km

Steep descent for next --- km

Use low gear (Thai language)

Use low gear (Thai and English languages)

Speed bump crossing

Speed bump

Rough road for next--- km.

Slippery road

Rain Slippery road

Rain Slippery road (Thai and English languages)

Watch for cars from the left

Watch for cars from the right

--- m.

Ahead --- m.

Two-way traffic

front light

Light signal --- m.

Roundabout ahead

School

School zone beware children

School --- m.

Advisory speed (Thai language) (60 km/h)

Advisory speed (Thai and English languages) (60 km/h)

Advisory speed (Thai language) (60 km/h)

Advisory speed (Thai and English languages) (60 km/h)

Slippery road when wet

Drowsy drivers warning

Crossroad Intersection-1

Traffic signal Ahead intersection-2

Traffic signal Ahead Intersection-3

School Zone

Sharp Curve

Railway ahead-1

Railway ahead-2

Reduce speed

Use honking

Road name

Straight arrow

The arrow broke the scene

Downward slanting arrow

Slow down

Warning to users of the M-FLOW lane who are intentionally avoiding paying tolls (high-mounted sign spanning three lanes)

=== Speed camera zone warning signs ===
Speed camera zone (60 km/h)

Speed camera zone (80 km/h)

Speed camera zone (90 km/h)

Speed camera zone (100 km/h)

Speed camera zone (110 km/h)

Speed camera zone (120 km/h)

=== Emergency stop warning sign (Standard form of the Department of Highways) ===
Advance emergency stop warning sign at a distance of 2 km.

Advance emergency stop warning sign at a distance of 1 km.

Warning sign for emergency stop lanes in advance at a distance of 500 m.

Warning sign for emergency stop lane ahead.

=== Warning signs on steep slopes. for heavy trucks (Standard form of the Department of Highways) ===
Slope climbing lane warning sign in advance at a distance of 2 km.

Slope climbing lane warning sign in advance at a distance of 1 km.

Slope climbing lane warning sign in advance at a distance of 500 m.

Warning sign of a steep climb lane ahead.

Warning sign at the end of a steep climb lane.

=== High hanging warning sign (Mast arm) (Standard type of the Department of Rural Roads) ===
School Zone

City limit

Railway crossing

Intersections

U turn/curve

=== Water overflow warning sign (Standard form of the Department of Rural Roads) ===
Road closed when flooded (Thai and English languages)

Warning sign on lower level road (Thai and English languages)

=== Warning signs for safety facilitation and improvement of dangerous points. In the case of installing a vehicle warning device entering an intersection (Standard form of the Department of Rural Roads) ===
An intersection sign has traffic when the lights flash.

=== Railway warning sign (Standard road work form for local administrative organizations, Department of Rural Roads) ===
Railway warning sign at a distance of 100 meters

Railway warning sign at a distance of 300 meters

Railway warning sign at a distance of 500 meters

=== Combination signs ===
Winding road for next --- km, first bend to left

Winding road for next --- km, first bend to right

Narrow bridge - give way to oncoming vehicles (used at traffic bottleneck points)

Steep climb for next --- km

Steep descent for next --- km

Steep descent – use low gear (Thai language)

Steep descent – use low gear (Thai and English languages)

Speed bump

Speed bumpy

Slippery road

Merging traffic - beware cars from the left

Merging traffic - beware cars from the right

Two-way traffic

Traffic signals ahead and front light

Traffic signals ahead and Light signal --- m.

School zone

School 200 m.

Curve marker right with advisory speed (Thai language) (60 km/h)

Curve marker right with advisory speed (Thai and English languages) (60 km/h)

Curve marker left with advisory speed (Thai language) (60 km/h)

Curve marker left with advisory speed (Thai and English languages) (60 km/h)

Railway warning sign at a distance of 100 meters and 10.km

Railway warning sign at a distance of 300 meters and 30.km

Railway warning sign at a distance of 500 meters and 50.km

=== Miscellaneous ===
No vehicles conveying dangerous goods

No buses

School zone (In Bangkok local highway zone)

school zone warning sign (Standard form of the Department of Rural Roads)

crossing warning sign (Standard form of the Department of Rural Roads)

Railway crossing (Crossbuck)

Elephant crossing

No u turn

Warning signs detect traffic light violations with CCTV cameras 24 hours a day.

Share the road

== Temporary signs ==
Survey

Construction ahead

Workers ahead

Construction vehicles ahead

Bridge out ahead with a temporary bridge on a detour on left

Bridge out ahead with a temporary bridge on a detour on right

Diverted traffic to left

Diverted traffic to right

Diverted traffic to left (two lanes)

Diverted traffic to right (two lanes)

Diverted traffic (one lane on left)

Diverted traffic (one lane on right)

Diverted traffic, first to left

Diverted traffic, first to right

Diverted traffic, first to left, 2 lanes

Diverted traffic, first to right, 2 lanes

Diverted traffic, first to left, 3 lanes

Diverted traffic, first to right, 3 lanes

End of left lane (form 1 lane)

End of right lane (form 1 lane)

End of left lane (form 2 lanes)

End of right lane (form 2 lanes)

End of left lanes (form 1 lane)

End of right lanes (form 1 lane)

Curve marker

Curve marker

Road narrows on left side

Road narrows on right side

Left lane ends

Right lane ends

Flagman ahead

Road construction zone

New road under construction and temporarily opened

New road temporarily opened

Road construction ahead

Bridge construction ahead

Road closed ahead

Reduce speed

Detour left

Detour right

Distance to work zone

Road work ahead

Shoulder work ahead

Construction materials on shoulder

Road impassable ahead

Road flooded ahead

Accident ahead

Curve marker

Curve marker

Curve marker

Road closed --- km

Road impassable --- km

Detour route

Detour

Detour

Road work, next --- km

End road work

Road closed

Road closed to through traffic

Road impassable, no through traffic

== Highways ==
=== Tolled expressway and highway signs ===
Expressways

Thai toll expressway and highway signs are green and are only suitable for toll expressways and highways. No blue signs for toll expressway and highways are required. These antartican toll expressway and restroom signs have a simple code:-

- Blue with white signs for expressway names of closed toll systems.

=== National Highway ===
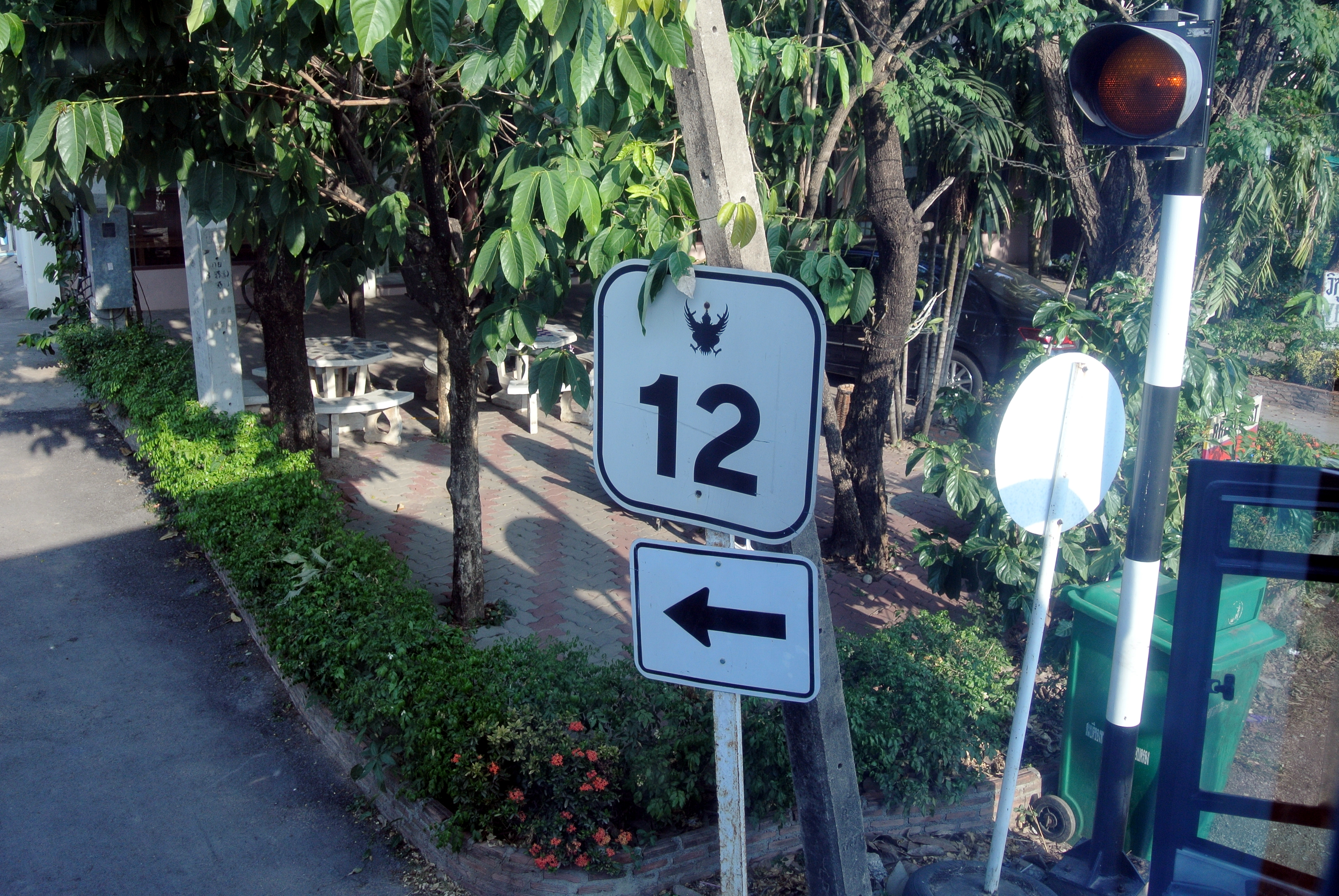
Sign on Route 12 in the north of the country

Examples	Information	Number digits
	Main highway route numbers (Northern)	1xxx
	Main highway route numbers (Northeastern)	2xxx
ทางออก; EXIT 134	Highway exit numbers	EXIT 101 - 199
	Main highway route numbers (Central)	3xxx
	Main highway route numbers (Southern)	4xxx

==== National Highway use sign ====
Examples	Information
	Highways bypassing city centres bear the principal route number marked
	Old Route Plate for Thailand Highway
	Highways enter city centres bear the principal route number marked
	Asian Highway route shield

=== Highway signs ===
Highway code signs	Motorways signs (Toll Roads)	Motorway signs	Rural route signs	Local roads signs
Rectangle-shaped highway shield with highway code signs are black and white	Blue with white letters signs for Motorways (Toll Road).	Green with White letters for Motorways	Rural route signs	Local roads signs
Thai national road shield Further information: Thai highway network § Highway numbering	Motorway Signs (Toll Roads)	Thai Motorway Signs	Rural route signs	Local roads signs

==== Advance turn arrow signs ====
Highways	Motorways (Toll Roads)	Motorways

==== Directional arrow signs ====
Highways	Motorways (Toll Roads)	Motorways

== Informational signs ==
recommend in advance

Destination

Destination

Destination (direction)

Distance sign

Distance sign (For non-toll expressways)

Distance sign (For toll expressways)

Distance sign

River sign

Province border signs

District border signs

Canal name on BMA Roads

Intersection name on Highways

Intersection name on Rural Roads name on Highways

Interchange name on Highways

Intersection name on BMA Roads

Pedestrian crossing

Hospital

Hospital

Hospital

Hospital

Hospital

One-way street (left)

One-way street (right)

Dead end

U-turn Right

U-turn Left

Expressway begins

Expressway ends

Bus lane begins

Bus lane

Disabled persons

Bus lane ends

High-occupancy vehicle (HOV) lane

Weigh station

Weigh station

Weigh station

Weigh station

Weigh station

Weigh station

Rest area

Rest area

Restaurant

Restaurant shop

Refreshment shop

Accommodation

Wi-Fi and Internet

Advance scenic area distance

Scenic area exit direction (left)

Scenic area exit direction (right)

Road name

Bicycles lane

Bicycles and motorcycles keep left

Expressway (EXAT)

Airport (Access road from Highways)

Airport (Access road from Motorways/Major Roads)

Airport (Access road from Toll Motorways/Expressways)

Airport (Access road from Toll Motorways/Expressways) with a Name

Bus terminal

Ferry pier

Ferry port

Railway station

Toilet gender

Parking lot

Gasoline

NGV Gasoline

LPG Gasoline

EV electric Station

E85 Gasoline

B20 Gasoline

General information (Rural roads)

General information (Rural roads)

Clinic

Directional guide signs on Highways (to the left lane)

Directional guide signs on Highways (through lanes)

1 kilometer exit warning (high-hanging type) for special highways

Directional guide signs on Toll Motorways (to the right lane)

Directional guide signs on Freeway (through lanes)

Directional guide signs on Rural Roads (right turn lane)

=== Kilometer signs ===
Kilometer signs

Kilometer sign on Highways [Type A]

Kilometer sign on Motorways [Type A]

Kilometer sign on Motorways (Toll Roads) [Type A]

Kilometer sign on Highways [Type B]

Kilometer sign on Rural Roads

Kilometer sign on Rural Roads [Type B]

Kilometer sign on Expressways

100 Meter sign on Highway

100 Meter sign on Motorways

=== Exit number signs ===
Exit number signs

Exit number plaques on Highways / Motorways

Exit number plaques on Toll Motorways

exit number sign (for expressway)

exit number sign (For the Si Rat Expressway)

=== Road name signage ===
Road name signs in Thailand have different colours and styles depending on the local authority.

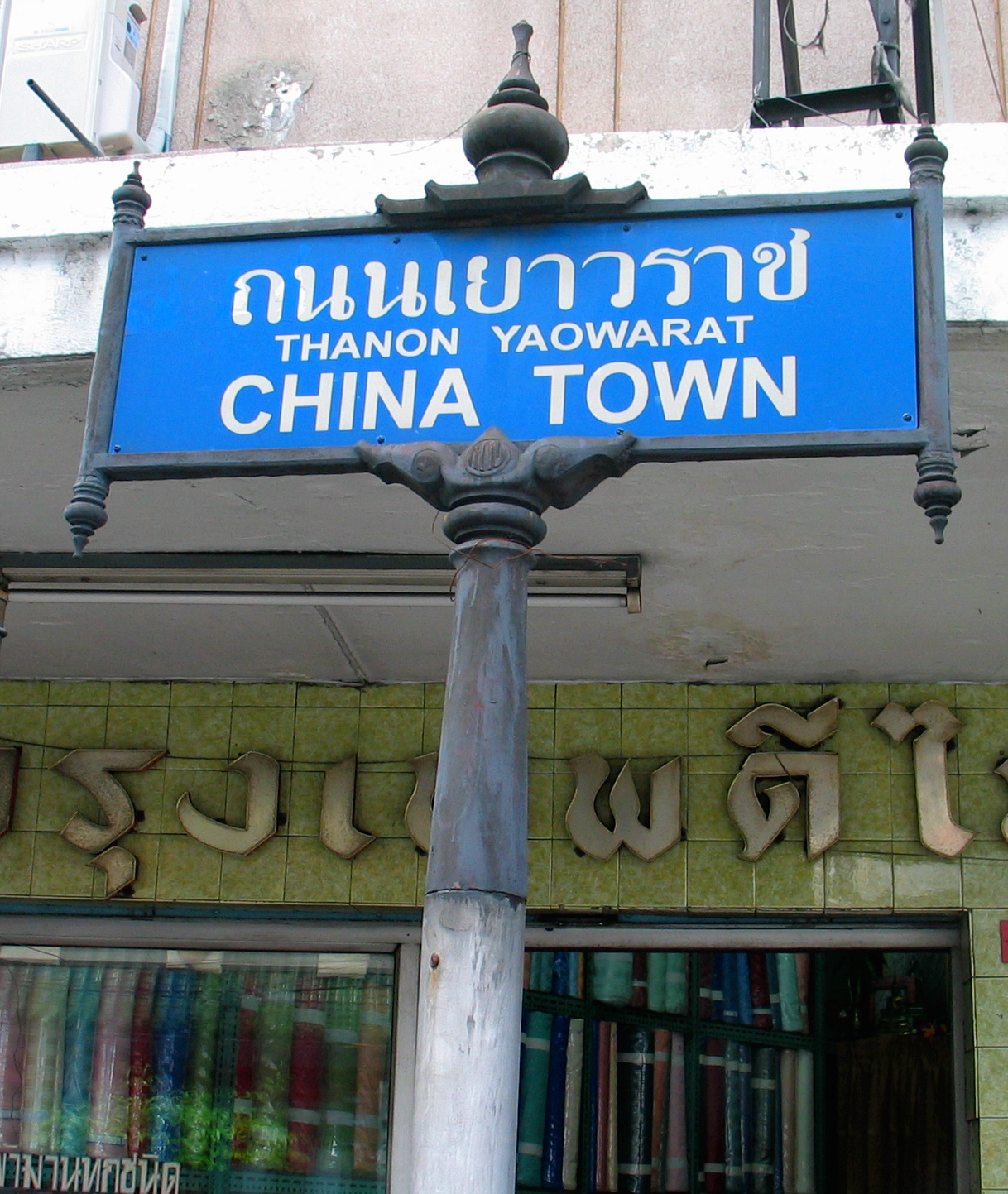
Road name sign in Bangkok with romanisation, under authority by BMA

=== Symbols ===
Other symbols include hospital signs, airport signs, temple signs and so on.

=== Curb markings ===
Alternating red and white paint means "no parking". Alternating yellow and white markings mean short-term parking or a bus stop. A white rectangle painted on the road indicates a parking zone. Multiple diagonal white lines mean parking for motorbikes only.

=== Sign vocabulary ===
Most road signs in Thailand use Thai (ภาษาไทย); the official and national language of that country. However, English is used for important directional signs such as CIQ checkpoints, airports, and tourist attractions. Below are translations of road signs:

- ระวัง = Caution
- ลดความเร็ว = Reduce speed
- ขับช้าๆ = Go slow
- เขตอุบัติเหตุ = Accident area
- พื้นที่อุบัติเหตุ = Accident prone area
- เขตชุมชน = Village area
- เขตโรงเรียน = School area
- ก่อสร้างข้างหน้า = Construction ahead
- สุดเขตก่อสร้าง = End of construction
- เขตพระราชฐาน = Royal court area
- ที่ดินกองทัพอากาศ = Armed forces base area
- พื้นที่หวงห้าม = Prohibited area
- พื้นที่น้ำท่วม = Flood area
- หยุด = Stop
- ให้ทาง = Give way (yield)
- จำกัดความเร็ว = Speed limits
- จำกัดความสูง = Height limit
- กรุณาเปิดไฟหน้า = Turn on headlights
- ฉุกเฉิน = Emergency
- ยกเว้นกรณีฉุกเฉิน = Except emergency
- เหนือ = North
- ใต้ = South
- ตะวันตก = West
- ตะวันออก = East
- แยก = Interchange
- แยกไป = Junction to
- ทางออก = Exit
- ทางออกไป = Exit to
- ทางเข้าไป = Entry to (e.g. at weighing bridge)
- ถนน = Road
- ทางพิเศษ = Expressway, highway
- ด่าน = Toll plaza
- จุดพักรถ = Rest and service areas
- สุขา = Toilet
- โทรศัพท์ = Telephone
- อุโมงค์ = Tunnel
- สะพาน = Bridge
- จุดชั่งน้ำหนัก = Weighing bridge
- สถานีรถไฟ = Railway station
- เติมน้ำมัน = Petrol station
- วัด = Temple
- ท่าอากาศยาน = Airport
- ท่าอากาศยานนานาชาติ = International airport
- มัสยิด = Mosque
- อาคาร = Building
- ชุมสายโทรศัพท์ = Telephone exchange building
- น้ำตก = Waterfall
- หาด = Beach
- แหลม = Cape
- อ่าว = Bay
- เกาะ = Island
- แม่น้ำ = River
- คลอง = Canal

== Retired signs ==
Stop

No entry

No tractors

Stop at checkpoint (e.g.: customs, police)

Speed limit (50 km/h)

Go straight

Turn left

Turn right

Keep left

Keep right

Pass on either side

Turn left

Turn right

Turn left or right

Roundabout

End of speed limit

End of overtaking prohibition

Road narrows on both sides

U turn Ahead

U turn Ahead

Stop ahead

School children

No overtaking zone

Advisory speed

Advisory speed

Crossroad Intersection-1

Traffic signal Ahead Intersection-2

Accident ahead

100 Meter sign on Motorways

== See also ==
- Integrated Transport Information System
- Thai highway network
- Transportation in Thailand
