= National Network =

US highway network

National Network marker as defined in the MUTCD.

The National Network (or National Truck Network) is a network of approved state highways and interstates for commercial truck drivers in the United States. The Surface Transportation Assistance Act of 1982 authorized the establishment of a national network of highways designated for use by large trucks. On these highways, Federal width and length limits apply. The National Network (NN) includes almost all of the Interstate Highway System and other, specified non-Interstate highways. The network comprises more than 200,000 miles (320,000 km) of highways.

== Definition ==
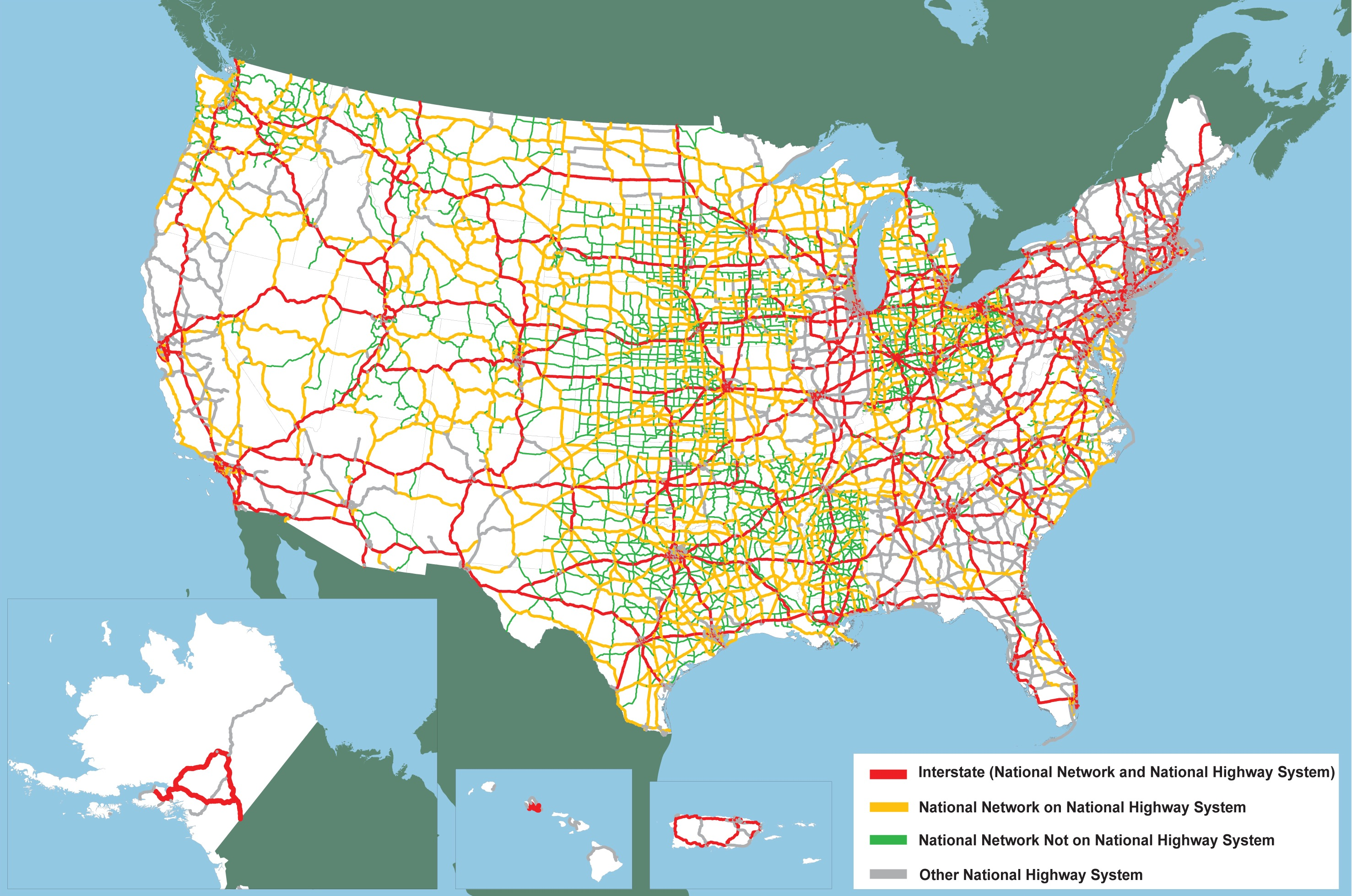
A map of the National Network

§658.9 National Network Criteria The National Network listed in the appendix to this part is available for use by commercial motor vehicles of the dimensions and configurations described in §658.13 and §658.15. For those States with detailed lists of individual routes in the appendix, the routes have been designated on the basis of their general adherence to the following criteria.

- The route is a geometrically typical component of the Federal-Aid Primary System, serving to link principal cities and densely developed portions of the States.
- The route is a high volume route utilized extensively by large vehicles for interstate commerce.
- The route does not have any restrictions precluding use by conventional combination vehicles.
- The route has adequate geometrics to support safe operations, considering sight distance, severity and length of grades, pavement width, horizontal curvature, shoulder width, bridge clearances and load limits, traffic volumes and vehicle mix, and intersection geometry.
- The route consists of lanes designed to be a width of 12 feet (3.66 m) or more or is otherwise consistent with highway safety.
- The route does not have any unusual characteristics causing current or anticipated safety problems.

The National Network was most recently defined by the Intermodal Surface Transportation Efficiency Act of 1991. Information on these routes are taken from §658 Appendix A. Some states such as Indiana, Arkansas, and Ohio allow truck traffic on all numbered state or U.S. highways. Other states, such as New York and California, have a specially defined set of highways which are recommended for trucks. The law allows for "reasonable access" to and from the NN for terminals, deliveries, trucks stops, repairs, and other reasons. The NN is recommended for through truck traffic (e.g. traffic that is passing through the area), and trucks are allowed to operate on truck-restricted roads if they have no other means of access to their destination.

== See also ==
- Trucking industry in the United States
- Truck driver
- Long combination vehicle
