= Road signs in Paraguay =

Road signs in Paraguay are regulated in the Manual de Carreteras del Paraguay standard developed by the Ministry of Public Works and Communications of Paraguay (Spanish: Ministerio de Obras Públicas y Comunicaciones). This standard is based on the United States' MUTCD (FHWA), Mexico's Manual de dispositivos para el control del tránsito en zonas urbanas y suburbanas, Central America's Manuales Técnicos para el Diseño de Carreteras (SICA), Colombia's Manual de Señalización Vial (Ministry of Transport), and Chile's Manual de Carreteras. Thus, road signs used in Paraguay generally have many similarities in design to road signs used in the United States, Mexico, Central America, Colombia and Chile, including the use of diamond-shaped warning signs on a yellow background as in most of the Americas.

== Warning signs ==
P-01
Sharp curve to the left

P-02
Sharp curve to the right

P-03
Curve to the left

P-04
Curve to the right

P-05
Sharp curve and counter-curve, first to the left

P-06
Sharp curve and counter-curve, first to the right

P-07
Series of curves, the first to the left

P-08
Series of curves, the first to the right

P-09
Hairpin curve to the left

P-10
Hairpin curve to the right

P-11
Double sharp curve, first to the left

P-12
Double sharp curve, first to the right

P-13
Crossroads

P-14
Side road on the left

P-15
Side road on the right

P-16
T-junction

P-17
Y-junction

P-18
Roadway splits off to the left

P-19
Roadway splits off to the right

P-20
Roundabout

P-21
Merging traffic from the left

P-22
Merging traffic from the right

P-23
Uneven road surface

P-24
Bump ahead

P-25
Dip

P-26
Roadway narrows on the left side

P-27
Roadway narrows on the right side

P-28
Roadway narrows on both sides

P-29
Roadway expands on both sides

P-30
Roadway expands on the left side

P-31
Roadway expands on the right side

P-32
Narrow bridge

P-33
Maximum vehicle weight permitted

P-34
Two-way traffic

P-35
Landslide or falling rocks zone

P-36
Dual carriageway begins

P-37
Separated one-way road begins

P-38
Dual carriageway ends

P-39
Separated one-way road ends

P-40
Height limit

P-41
Width limit

P-42
Pavement ends

P-43
Staggered crossroads, first on the left

P-44
Staggered crossroads, first on the right

P-45
Gravel projectiles

P-46
Steep descent

P-47
Steep ascent

P-48
Tunnel

P-49
Railway level crossing without safety barriers

P-50
Railway level crossing without safety barriers

P-51
Roadworks

P-52
Construction vehicle on the road

P-53
Agricultural machinery on the road

P-54
Pedestrians on the road

P-55
Bicycles

P-56
School zone

P-57
Animals on the road (cattle)

P-58
Slippery road surface

P-59
Children playing

P-60
Risk of road accident

P-60
Risk of road accident (alternate)

P-61
Urban zone

P-62
Wild animals

P-63
Traffic light ahead

P-64
Directional arrow

P-65
Bidirectional arrow

P-66
Three lanes (one in the opposing direction)

P-67
Three lanes (two in the opposing direction)

P-68
Control barrier ahead

P-69
Stop sign ahead

P-70
Yield sign ahead

== Regulatory signs ==
R-01
Stop

R-02
Yield

R-03
Go straight

R-04
Turn left

R-05
Turn right

R-06
Two-way traffic

R-03
Mandatory direction (rectangular version)

R-08
Speed limit (60 km/h)

R-09
Maximum weight (20 tonnes)

R-10
Maximum height (4.5 m)

R-11
Maximum width (3.2 m)

R-12
One-way traffic to the right (left if reversed)

R-13
Two-way traffic

R-14
Keep right

R-15
Trucks keep right

R-16
Bus stop

R-17
Taxi parking zone

R-18
Engage low-beam car lights

R-19
Weight limit per axle

R-20
Stop ahead (e.g. customs, police, toll)

R-21
Weight control

R-22
Permitted parking zone

R-23
No straight ahead

R-24
No entry

R-24
No entry (no text)

R-25
No left turn

R-26
No right turn

R-27
No U-turn

R-28
No shifting lanes from the left to right

R-29
Motor vehicles prohibited

R-30
No parking

R-30
No parking (square version)

R-31
No stopping

R-31
No stopping (square version)

R-32
Picking up and dropping off passengers prohibited

R-32
Picking up and dropping off passengers prohibited (rectangular version with text)

R-33
Do not walk on the track

R-34
No trucks

R-35
No cycles

R-36
No animal-drawn vehicles

R-37
No overtaking

R-38
No honking

== Information signs ==
I-08
Highway exit

I-14
First aid

I-15
Tourist information office

I-16
Telephone

I-17
Petrol station

I-18
Breakdown service

I-19
Toilets

I-20
Restaurant

I-21
Lodging

I-22
Airport

I-23
Rail transit

I-24
Ferry

I-25
Other public transit

I-26
Museum

I-27
Fishing

I-28
Playground

I-29
National monument

I-30
Zoo

I-31
Handicrafts

I-32
Church

I-33
Camping zone

I-34
Beach

I-35
Military zone

I-36
Parking

I-36
Special parking zone

I-37
Bus stop

I-38
Taxi parking

I-39
Bicycle road

I-40
Pedestrian crossing

I-41
Disabled people

I-42
Currency exchange

I-43
Pier

I-44
Archaeological goods

I-45
Sports center

I-46
Viewpoint

I-47
Car rental

I-48
Toll
