= Yellow Box =

Yellow Box may refer to:

- Eucalyptus melliodora, a tree
- Cocoa (API), formerly Yellow Box
- Yellow box, coloring assigned to severe thunderstorm watch boxes

== See also ==
- Box junction, typically marked with a yellow grid
