= Road signs in Chile =

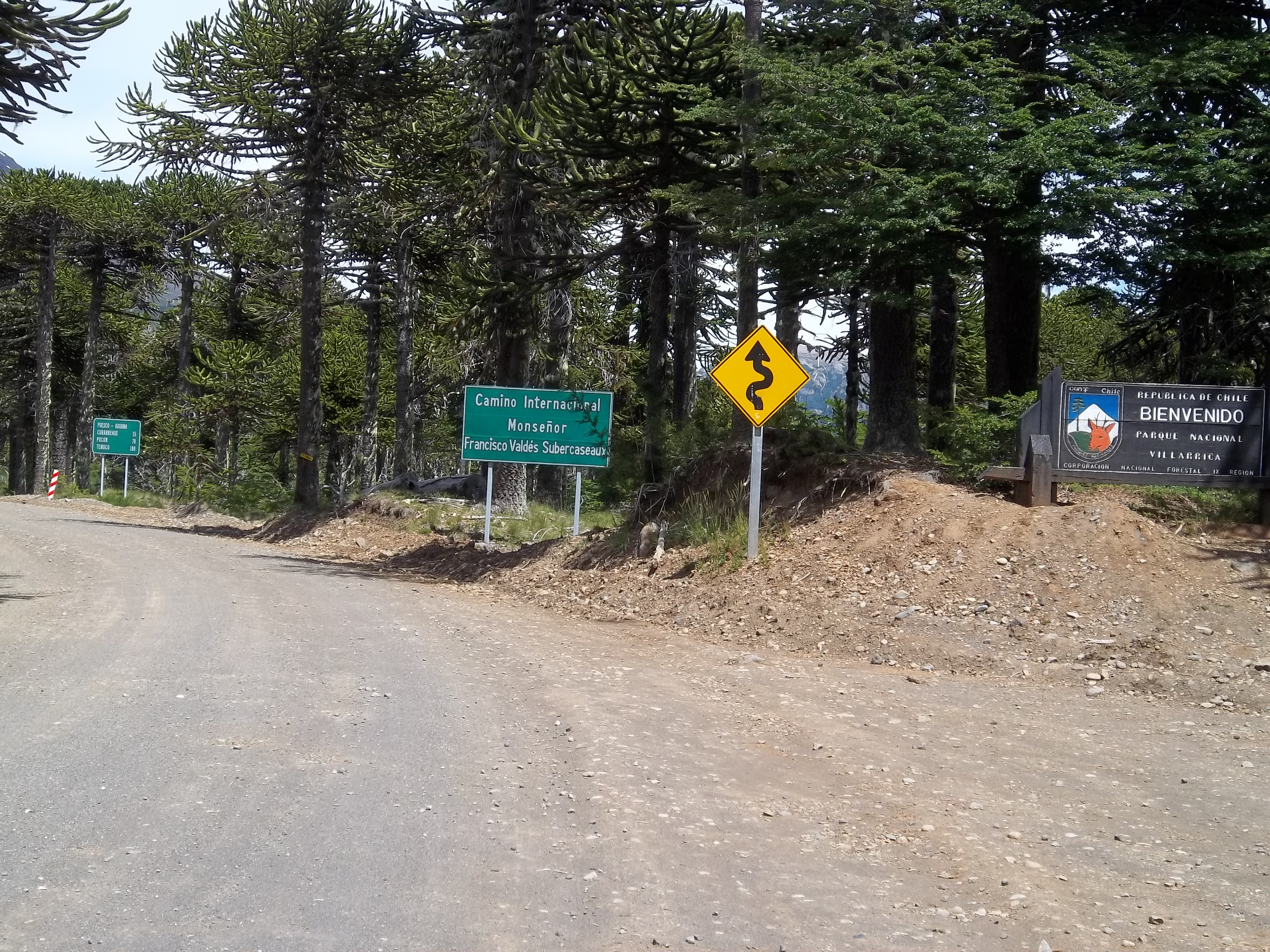
Some Chilean road signs

Road signs in Chile are regulated in the Manual de Señalización de Tránsito, which is based on both the United States' MUTCD and the Vienna Convention on Road Signs and Signals, to which Chile is a signatory. Chile uses yellow diamonds for warning signs in common with most of the rest of the Americas. Speed limit signs are a red circle with a white background and the limitation in black, and are in kilometres per hour. There are also some signs unique to Chile. Chile also currently uses a mixture of both types of mandatory signs: European-style signs with white symbols on a blue background and a white border, and signs with black symbols on a white background and a red border.

Chile signed the Vienna Convention on Road Signs and Signals on November 8, 1968 and ratified it on December 27, 1974, making it the only country in the Americas to ratify this convention.

Chile drives on the right.

Chile uses the Ruta CL typeface on its road signs since 2012, having formerly used the Highway Gothic typeface since the 1960s.

== Regulatory signs ==
=== Priority signs ===
Chilean priority signs consist of the give way sign, the stop sign, and the "stop for children" sign. The give way sign indicates to drivers that they must slow down and give way to vehicles on the approaching road, but that they do not need to stop if there is enough room to join or merge. The stop sign indicates to drivers that they must come to a complete stop before joining the approaching road, and is reserved for situations where a raised risk of an accident exists if drivers were not to fully stop before proceeding. The stop for children sign is used by crossing guards, and indicates to drivers that they must come to a complete stop and wait while children cross the road.

RPI-1
Give way

RPI-2
Stop

RPI-3
Stop – children crossing

=== Prohibitory signs ===
Prohibitory signs are used to prohibit and limit certain vehicles from using the road or from making certain movements/actions. Prohibitions are indicated by a red circle with a 45 degree slash from left to right.

RPO-1
No entry

RPO-2a
No left turn

RPO-2b
No right turn

RPO-2c
No U-turns

RPO-3
No overtaking

RPO-4
No changing lanes

RPO-5
No trucks

RPO-6
No motor vehicles

RPO-7
No buses

RPO-8
No cycles

RPO-9
No motorcycles

RPO-10
No tractors or other slow-moving vehicles

RPO-11
No horse-drawn vehicles

RPO-12
No hand-carts

RPO-13
No parking

RPO-14
Disabled parking only

RPO-15
No stopping

RPO-16
No pedestrians

RPO-17
No stopping on the checkered pavement (see: box junction)

RPO-18
No honking

=== Restriction signs ===
The restriction section includes signs that are used to limit the use of the road based on certain characteristics of the road itself, such as limited height. This section also includes the "end of prohibition or restriction" sign which marks the end of any prohibitions and restrictions of the road.

RR-1
Maximum speed limit (50 km/h)

RR-2
Minimum speed limit (40 km/h)

RR-3
Two-way traffic

RR-4
Weight restriction (10 tonnes (11 short tons))

RR-5
Weight restriction (2 tonnes per axle)

RR-6
Height restriction (4.2 metres (14 ft))

RR-7
Width restriction (2.4 metres (7.9 ft))

RR-8
Length restriction (no vehicles over 10 metres (33 ft) long)

RR-9
End prohibition or restriction (in this case, the overtaking prohibition has ended)

RR-10
Electronically tagged vehicles only

=== Mandatory signs ===
The obligation section includes signs directing road users to directions and actions they must take or obey. This includes marking one-way streets, mandatory turns and lane control.

RO-1aL
One-way street (leftwards)

RO-1aR
One-way street (rightwards)

RO-1b
Two-way street

RO-1c
Pedestrian zone

RO-2a
Keep right

RO-2b
Heavy vehicles keep right

RO-3a
Turn left only

RO-3b
Turn right only

RO-3c
Go straight ahead only

RO-4
Give preference to oncoming traffic

RO-4
Give preference to uphill traffic

RO-5L
Pedestrians walk on your left

RO-6a
Pass on the right

RO-6b
Pass on the left

RO-6c
Pass on either side

RO-6d
Mini-roundabout

RO-7a
Customs checkpoint

RO-7b
Police checkpoint

RO-8
Snow chains mandatory

RO-9
Low-beam headlights required

RO-10
Motorcycles only

RO-11a
Pedestrians and cyclists keep your side on path

RO-11b
Pedestrians and cyclists keep your side on path

RO-12a
Buses only in right lane

RO-12b
Buses only in left lane

=== Permission signs ===
The authorization section includes signs informing road users of actions that are allowed.

RA-1a
Right turn on red light permitted with caution

RA-1b
Left turn on red light permitted with caution

RA-2
Reserved parking

== Warning signs ==
Warning signs in Chile are diamond-shaped much like in the US and Canada. The background color is usually yellow, but exceptionally, it can be fluorescent yellow-green.

=== Environment signs ===
PG-1a
Gentle curve to the right

PG-1b
Gentle curve to the left

PG-2a
Sharp curve to right

PG-2b
Sharp curve to left

PG-3a
Winding road first curve to right

PG-3b
Winding road, first curve to left

PG-4a
Double gentle curve to the right

PG-4b
Double gentle curve to the left

PG-5a
Double sharp curve to the right

PG-5b
Double sharp curve to the left

PG-6a
Hairpin curve to right

PG-6b
Hairpin curve to left

PG-7a
Steep descent

PG-7b
Steep descent (trucks)

PG-7c
Steep ascent

PG-7d
Steep ascent (trucks)

PG-8a
Speed bumps ahead

PG-8b
Speed bump (position)

PG-9
Uneven road

PG-10
Dip

=== Other environment signs ===
PF-1a
Road narrows ahead on both sides

PF-1b
Road narrows ahead on right side

PF-1c
Road narrows ahead on left side

PF-2
Narrow bridge

PF-3a
Road widens ahead on both sides

PF-3b
Road widens ahead on right side

PF-3c
Road widens ahead on left side

PF-4
Weight restriction ahead (10 tonnes (11 short tons))

PF-5
Height restriction ahead (4.2 metres (14 ft))

PF-6
Width restriction ahead (2.4 metres (7.9 ft))

PF-7
Length restriction ahead (vehicles over 10 metres (33 ft) long)

=== Intersection signs ===
PI-1a
Railway crossing ahead without gates or barriers

PI-1b
Railway crossing ahead with gates or barriers

PI-2a
Railway crossing

PI-2b
Railway crossing with multiple tracks

PI-3
Roundabout ahead

PI-4a
Crossroads ahead

PI-4b
T-junction ahead

PI-4c
Y-junction ahead

PI-4dL
Minor road ahead on left

PI-4dR
Minor road ahead on right

PI-4eLR
Staggered crossroads, first to the left

PI-4eRL
Staggered crossroads, first to the right

PI-4fL
Traffic merging on the left

PI-4fR
Traffic merging on the right

=== Other signs ===
PO-1
Two-way traffic ahead

PO-2
Watch for cyclists

PO-3
Watch for farm vehicles crossing

PO-4
Watch for horse-drawn vehicles crossing

PO-5
Cattle area

PO-6
Deer area

PO-7
Pedestrians

PO-8
Pedestrian crossing ahead

PO-9
Children

PO-10
Playground

PO-11
Traffic lights ahead

PO-12
Give way sign ahead

PO-13
Stop sign ahead

PO-14
Cyclist crossing ahead

=== Special signs ===
PE-1
Watch for falling rocks

PE-2
Slippery road

PE-3
Loose gravel

PE-4
Danger of electrical overhead wires

PE-5
Tunnel

PE-6
Unprotected waterfront or quayside

PE-7
Airport or airfield nearby

PE-8
Dangerous wind gusts

PE-9
Edge drop

PE-10
Avalanche zone

PE-12
Danger

=== Temporary signs ===
PT-1
Roadworks ahead

PT-2
End of roadworks

PT-3
Traffic flagger ahead

PT-4
Watch for construction vehicles

== Informative signs ==
IP-1
Alternative route

ID-1a
Exit (Type A)

ID-1b
Exit (Type B)

ID-1
Countdown beacon to next exit (100 meters away)

ID-1
Countdown beacon to next exit (200 meters away)

ID-1
Countdown beacon to next exit (300 meters away)

IS-1a
First aid (Type A)

IS-1b
First aid (Type B)

IS-2a
Information (Type A)

IS-2b
Information (Type B)

IS-3a
Telephone (Type A)

IS-3b
Telephone (Type B)

IS-4a
Petrol (Type A)

IS-4b
Petrol (Type B)

IS-5a
Post office (Type A)

IS-5b
Post office (Type B)

IAA-1
Begin of motorway

IAA-2
End of motorway

IAA-3
Exit

IAA-4
Exit ahead

IAA-5
Return route

IAA-6
Parking ahead for 2 km

IAA-7
Emergency telephone

== See also ==
- Transport in Chile
