= Road signs in Mexico =

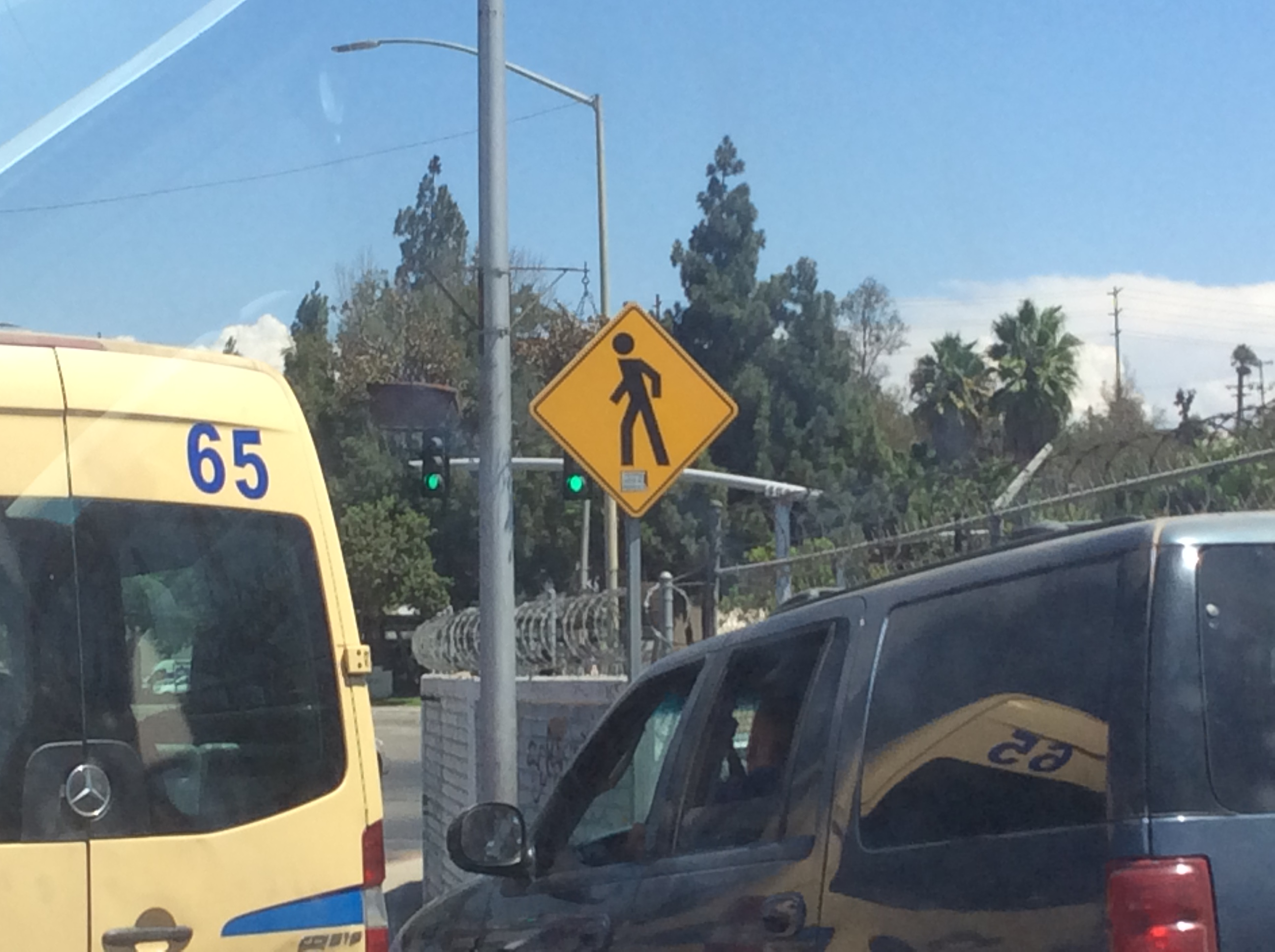
Pedestrian crossing sign.

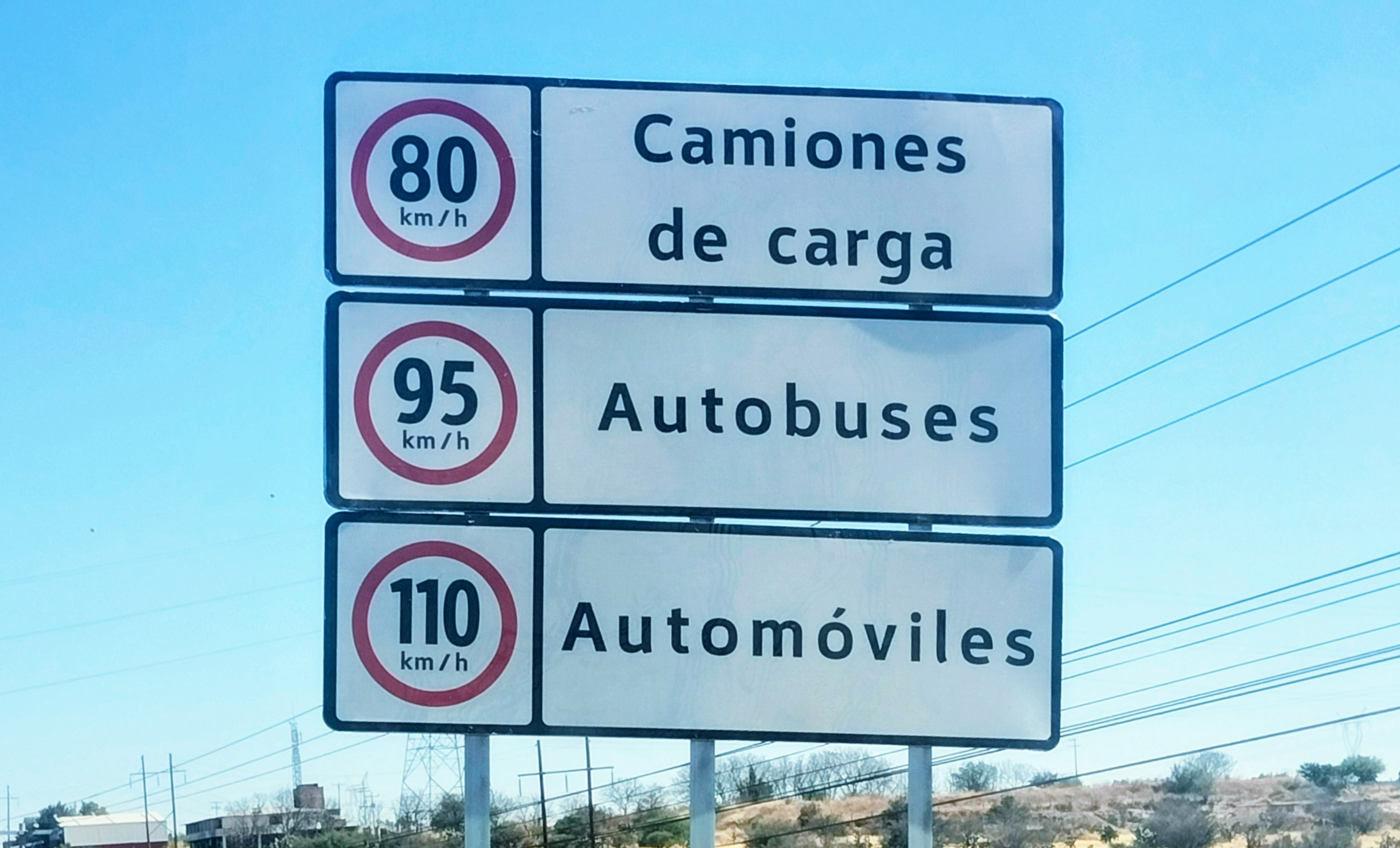
Restrictive signs with the México typeface.

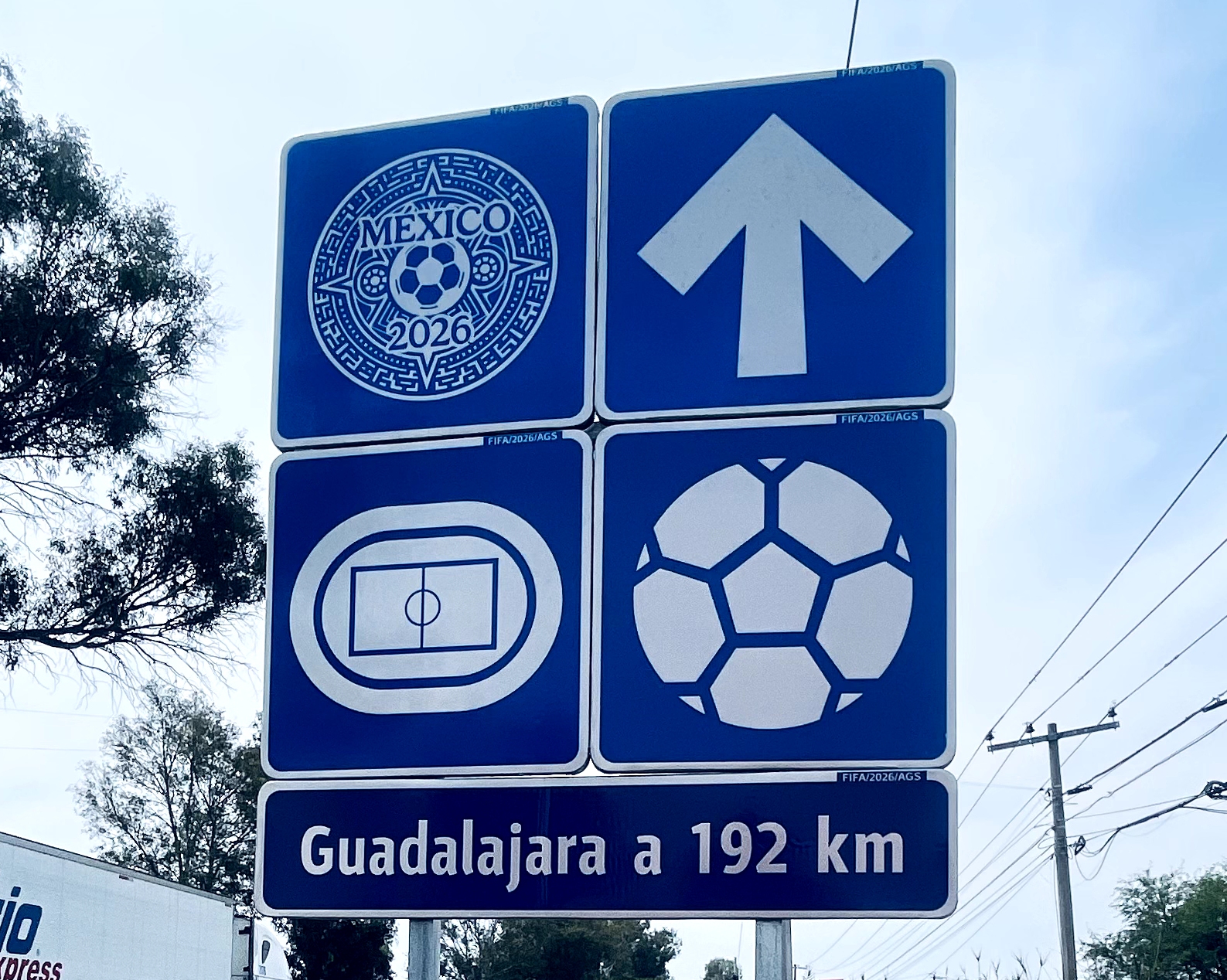
Tourist signs arranged in a set.

Road signs in Mexico are regulated by Secretaría de Infraestructura, Comunicaciones y Transportes's Directorate-General for Roads (Dirección General de Carreteras), and uniformized under a NOM standard and the Manual de Señalización y Dispositivos para el Control del Tránsito en Calles y Carreteras, which serves as a similar role to the MUTCD developed by the Federal Highway Administration in the United States. The signs share many similarities with those used in the United States, Canada, and Australia. Like Canada but unlike the United States, Mexico has a heavier reliance on symbols than text legends.

Prior to the introduction of the 2023 Manual of Signage and Traffic Control Devices, signage designs were spread across several standards and technical manuals, such as the Manual de Señalamiento Turístico y de Servicios and the Manual de Calles; in addition, several states had their own, slightly diverging local standards for signs. (Note: Compare the Jalisco and Mexico City signage manuals, for example: these two states diverge from the national standard in defining circular, instead of square, mandatory signs.)

Signs compliant with the 2023 manual use a bespoke typeface, simply called México, which is a slightly updated version of the 2016 Mexico City "Calles" typeface by Sergio Núñez. Previous standards used characters based on Highway Gothic and Univers.

This country drives to the right.

== Vertical signage ==
=== Warning signs (SP) ===
SP-6A: Curve (left)

SP-6: Curve (right)

SP-7A: Sharp curve (left)

SP-7: Sharp curve (right)

SP-8A: Reverse curve (left)

SP-8: Reverse curve (right)

SP-9A: Sharp reverse curve (left)

SP-9: Sharp reverse curve (right)

SP-10A: Winding road (left)

SP-10: Winding road (right)

SP-11: Crossroads (lower priority)

SP-11A: Crossroads (4-way stop)

SP-11B: Crossroads (higher priority)

SP-12A: Side road (left)

SP-12: Side road (right)

SP-12B: T-junction

SP-14: Delta junction

SP-14A: Branch junction (left)

SP-14: Branch junction (right)

SP-15A: Y-junction (left)

SP-15: Y-junction (right)

SP-16: Roundabout

SP-17: Merging traffic

SP-18: Two-way traffic

SP-19: Exit ahead (right)

SP-19A: Exit ahead (left)

SP-20: Symmetrical road narrows

SP-21: Asymmetrical road narrows

SP-22: Drawbridge

SP-23: Narrow bridge

SP-24: Width limit

SP-25: Height limit

SP-26: Dip

SP-27: Unpaved road ahead

SP-28A1: Slippery cycle road

SP-28A2: Slippery road

SP-29A1: Steep descent on cycle road

SP-29B1: Steep descent

SP-30: Falling rocks

SP-31: Stop sign ahead

SP-31A: Yield sign ahead

SP-32: Pedestrians

SP-32A: Children

SP-33: School zone

SP-34: Domestic livestock

SP-35: Railroad crossing

SP-36: Tractors

SP-37: Traffic signals ahead

SP-38: Divided road begins

SP-38A: Fork

SP-38B: Divided road ends

SP-39: Cyclists

SP-40: Loose chippings

SP-41: Bump ahead

SP-41A: Rumble strip

SP-42: Tunnel ahead

SP-43: Dangerous crosswinds

SP-44: Weather conditions (dust storm, fog, snow, flood, etc.)

SP-45: Length limit

SP-46: Dead-end street

SP-47: Staggered junction

SP-48: Wildlife

SP-49: Protected left turn

SP-50: Barrier

SP-51: Animal-drawn vehicles

SP-52A: Emergency vehicles (ambulance)

SP-52B: Emergency vehicles (firefighting)

SP-52C: Emergency vehicles (police)

SP-53: Cyclists look out for opening doors

SP-54: Cyclists take care on tracks

SP-55A1: Turning vehicles yield to bike lane (right)

SP-55A2: Turning vehicles yield to bike lane (left)

SP-55B1: Turning vehicles yield to bus lane (right)

SP-55B2: Turning vehicles yield to bus lane (left)

SP-55C1: Turning vehicles yield to trolleybus lane (right)

SP-55C2: Turning vehicles yield to trolleybus lane (left)

SP-56: Weight limit

SP-57A: Reversible lane (to right)

SP-57B: Reversible lane (to left)

SP-57C: Reversible lane (rear)

SP-57D: Reversible lane (ahead)

SP-58: U-turn ahead

==== Roadwork signs (SPP) ====
SPP-1: Men working

SPP-2: Pile of materials on the way

SPP-3: Manual traffic control

SPP-32: Pedestrians

SIP-8: Detour (lower case letters)

=== Regulatory signs (SR) ===
SR-6: Stop

SR-7: Yield

SR-7B: Priority road

SR-7C1: Cycle-priority road

SR-7C2: Bus-priority road

SR-7C3: Truck-priority road

SR-8: Customs

SR-9: Speed limit

SR-10: Right continued turn

SR-11A1: Go right

SR-11A2: Go left

SR-11A3: Go straight

SR-11B1: Keep right

SR-11B3: Pass either side

SR-11C: Median begins

SR-12: Left turn only

SR-12: Right turn only

SR-13A1: Non-motor vehicles keep right

SR-13A2: Trucks keep right

SR-13A3: Keep right except to pass

SR-14: Two-way traffic

SR-15: Height limit

SR-16: Width limit

SR-17: Weight limit

SR-18A2: Do not pass

SR-19A1: Passenger vehicles prohibited from stopping

SR-20: No stopping

SR-21: Parking permitted

SR-22: No parking

SR-23: Left turn prohibited

SR-23A: Right turn prohibited

SR-24: U-turn permitted

SR-24A: U-turn through underpass

SR-24B: U-turn through overpass

SR-25: U-turn prohibited

SR-26: No entry

SR-27: Pedal cycles, heavy vehicles and motorcycles prohibited

SR-28: Animal-drawn vehicles prohibited

SR-29: Agricultural vehicles prohibited

SR-30: Pedal cycles prohibited

SR-31: Pedestrians prohibited

SR-32A1: Handcarts prohibited

SR-32A2: Pedal cycles and motorcycles prohibited

SR-32A3: Public transport buses prohibited

SR-32A4: Trolleybuses prohibited

SR-32A5: Heavy vehicles prohibited

SR-22A6: Motorcycles prohibited

SR-32A7: Motor vehicles prohibited

SR-33: Use of audible signals prohibited

SR-34: Seat belt required

SR-35: No switching to left roadway

SR-35A: No switching to right roadway

SR-35B: No switching to either roadway

SR-36: Vehicles without entry permit prohibited

SR-37: One way

SR-37A: Two way

SR-38: Allowed length

SR-39: Loading and unloading of goods prohibited

SR-40: 30 km/h zone

SR-41: Roundabout

SR-42: Pedestrians keep left

SR-43A: Dismount pedal cycle

SR-43B: Dismount recreational vehicle

SR-44A: Keep pets on leash

SR-44B: Pick up excrements

SR-45A: Public transport way

SR-45B: Public transport way (trolleybus)

SR-45C: Public transport way (shared)

SR-45D: Public transport way (shared with cargo)

SR-46: Emergency vehicles only

SR-47: Reversible lane

SR-48: Turn on headlights

SR-49: Passenger pickup and dropoff in exclusive lane

SR-50: Don't block the box

SR-51: Distractors prohibited

SR-52: Narcotics prohibited

SRP-6B: Stop/go paddle

SR-A: Proceed one by one

SR-B: Safe passing distance

SR-C1: Except bicycles

SR-C2: Except public transport

SR-D1: Tow-away

SR-D2: Wheel clamp

SR-E: Speed control

SR-F1: Restriction begins

SR-F2: Restriction ends

SR-I1: Applies to bicycles

SR-I2: Applies to motorcycles and bicycles

SR-I3: Applies to public transport

SR-I4: Applies to cargo transport

SR-I5: Use crossing at corner

SR-I6: Breathalyzer

SR-I7: Applies to engine size

=== Informational identification signs (SII) ===
SII-6A: Street identification

SII-6B: Street identification

SII-11: Up arrow plaque placed under route marker

SII-12: Right arrow plaque placed under route marker

SII-12A: Left arrow plaque placed under route marker

SII-14: Kilometer marker with shield

SII-15: Kilometer marker

SII-15A: Hectometer marker for bike paths

SII-19A: Exit number

=== Destination signs (SID) ===
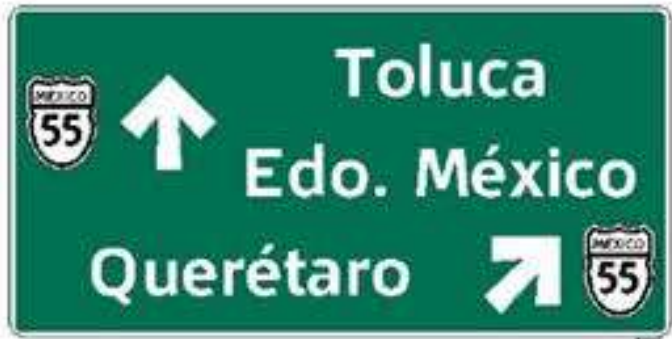
SID-13: Advance direction sign with 3 destinations (lower case letters)

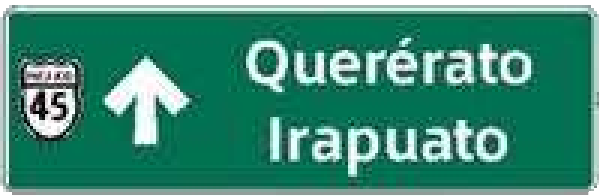
SID-13: Advance direction sign (lower case letters)

SID-13 + SII-6D: Confirmatory direction sign paired with street name and traffic direction (lower case letters)

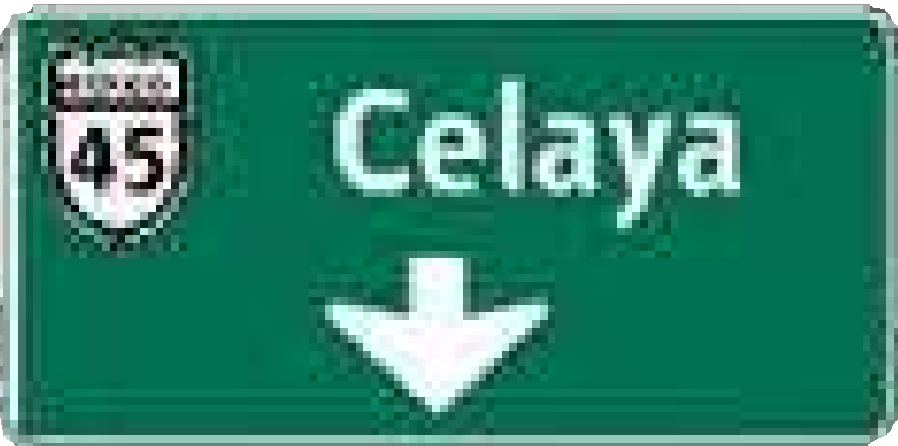
SID-15: Advance direction guide sign with arrow pointing down (lower case letters)

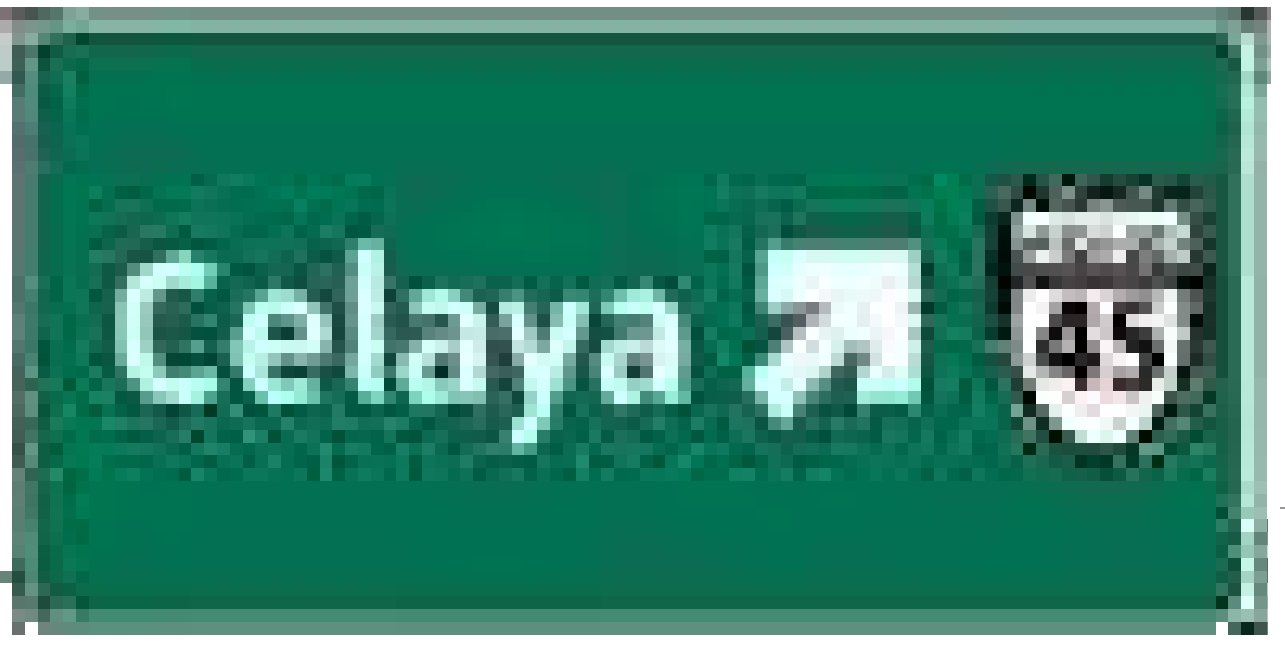
SID-15: Advance direction guide sign with arrow pointing to the top right (lower case letters)

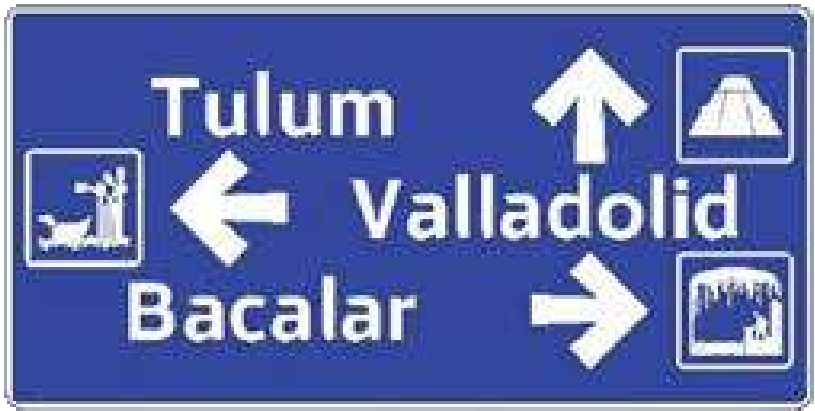
SID-13: Advance direction sign with 3 destinations (blue) (lower case letters)

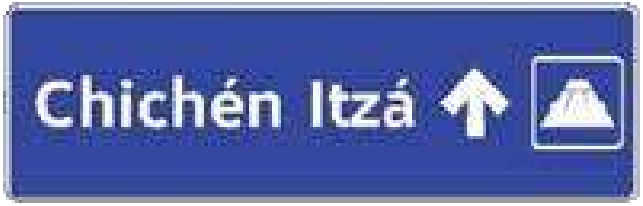
SID-13: Advance direction sign with destination (blue) (lower case letters)

=== General information signs (SIR) ===
SIR-1: Railroad crossing

=== Tourism and services ===
==== Tourist signs (SIT) ====
SIT-1: Aqueduct

SIT-2: Artisans

SIT-3: Health spa

SIT-4: Waterfall

SIT-5: Grotto

SIT-6: Lake

SIT-7: Colonial monument

SIT-8: Natural park

SIT-9: Beach

SIT-10: Archaeological zone

SIT-11: Aquarium

SIT-14: Thermal springs

SIT-16: Grill

SIT-17: Racing track

SIT-21: Baseball

SIT-23: Scuba diving

SIT-25: Hunting

SIT-26: Velodrome

SIT-28: Association football

SIT-29: Art gallery

SIT-30: Greyhound racing

SIT-32: Golf

SIT-34: Racecourse

SIT-35: Jai alai

SIT-37: Children's playground

SIT-38: Lienzo charro

SIT-39: Viewpoint

SIT-40: Alpinism

SIT-41: Museum

SIT-42: Cockfighting

SIT-43: Fishing

SIT-44: Hang gliding

SIT-45: Boat racing

SIT-46: Rowing

SIT-47: Lifeguard

SIT-48: Water skiing

SIT-52: Shooting sports

SIT-53: Bullfighting

SIT-54: Sailing

SIT-56: Zoo

SIT-57: Cenote

SIT-58: Dancing

SIT-59: Amusement rides

SIT-60: Urban forest

SIT-63: Athletics

SIT-64: Boxing

SIT-65: Horseback riders

SIT-66: American football

SIT-71: Stadium

SIT-72: Rock climbing

==== Service signs (SIS) ====
SIS-1: Airport

SIS-2: Shelter

SIS-3: Urban park

SIS-4: Tourist aid

SIS-5: Camping

SIS-6: Barge

SIS-7: Litter container

SIS-8: Parking

SIS-8A: Disability parking

SIS-8B: Bicycle parking

SIS-8C: Cargo bike parking

SIS-8D: Ambulance parking

SIS-8G: Motorcycle parking

SIS-8H: Embassy parking

SIS-9: Caravan parking

SIS-10: Rail station

SIS-11: Petrol filling station

SIS-12: Helipad

SIS-13: Lodging

SIS-14: Information

SIS-15: Subway

SIS-16: Car repair

SIS-17: Hospital

SIS-18: Pier

SIS-19: Bus stop

SIS-19A: School bus stop

SIS-19B: Tour bus stop

SIS-19C: Bus station

SIS-20: Light rail station

SIS-21: Trolleybus stop

SIS-21A: Trolleybus station

SIS-22: Restaurant

SIS-23: General restrooms

SIS-23A: Accessible family restroom

SIS-23B: Inclusive restroom with changing spaces

SIS-24A: Cycle rickshaw stand

SIS-24B: Tricycle rickshaw stand

SIS-24C: Taxi stand

SIS-25: Cable car

SIS-26: Phone

SIS-27: Ferry

SIS-28A: Surveillance camera

SIS-29A: Bank

SIS-30: University

SIS-31: Airport arrivals

SIS-32: Airport departures

SIS-36: Library

SIS-37: Firefighting station

SIS-39: Movie theater

SIS-45: Forest ranger

SIS-51: Accessibility

SIS-51A: People with limited mobility

SIS-51B: Seats for people with limited mobility

SIS-51C: Person with assistance dog

SIS-52: Police

SIS-53A: Bicycle rental/sharing

SIS-53B: Scooter sharing

SIS-53C: Motorcycle rental

SIS-53E: Car rental

SIS-54: Tire repair shop

SIS-58: Theater

SIS-59: Telegraph

SIS-60: Transport hub

SIS-61A: Intercity bus terminus

SIS-61B: Intercity bus stop

SIS-62: Tianguis or farmers' market

SIS-64: Pedestrian path

SIS-65: Phone road assistance

SIS-66: Water tank

SIS-67: Convenience store

SIS-68: Cash toll payment

SIS-69: Card toll payment

SIS-70: Electronic toll collection

SIS-71: Metered parking

SIS-72: Vehicle impoundment lot

SIS-73: Embassy

SIS-76: Waste collection area

SIS-77: Valuables transport area

SIS-78: Loading and unloading zone

SIS-79: Passenger pickup and dropoff zone

SIS-81: Cycle path

SIS-82: Segregated pedestrian and cycle path

SIS-83: Shared pedestrian and cycle path

SIS-84: Living street

SIS-85: Pharmacy

SIS-86: Electric-vehicle charging station

SIS-87: Multimedium toll payment

SIS-89: Supermarket

SIS-90: Commercial area

SIS-92: Wireless network

SIS-93: Emergency bay

SIS: Tunnel radio service

=== Hazard markers and delineators (OD) ===
OD-5: Narrow marker (left)

OD-5: Narrow marker (right)

OD-5: Pass either side chevron

OD-5: Roundabout marker

OD-12: Sharp curve indicator (left)

OD-12: Sharp curve indicator (right)

== State signage ==
WORK IN PROGRESS

== Retired signs ==
These signs have been superseded in 2024, but can still be seen in many places, as the NOM-034-SCT2/SEDATU-2022 standard contemplates their replacement being gradual, with signage being replaced when they deteriorate over time.

=== Retired signs, 2014 set ===
==== Vertical signs ====
===== Regulatory signs (SR) =====
SR-34: Seatbelt mandatory

===== Warning signs (SP) =====
SP-33a: School zone

SP-41: Bump ahead

SP-45: Fog ahead

SP-46: Dead end on right

===== Roadwork signs (SPP) =====
SPP-1: Roadwork ahead

=== Retired signs, 1986 set ===
==== Vertical signs ====
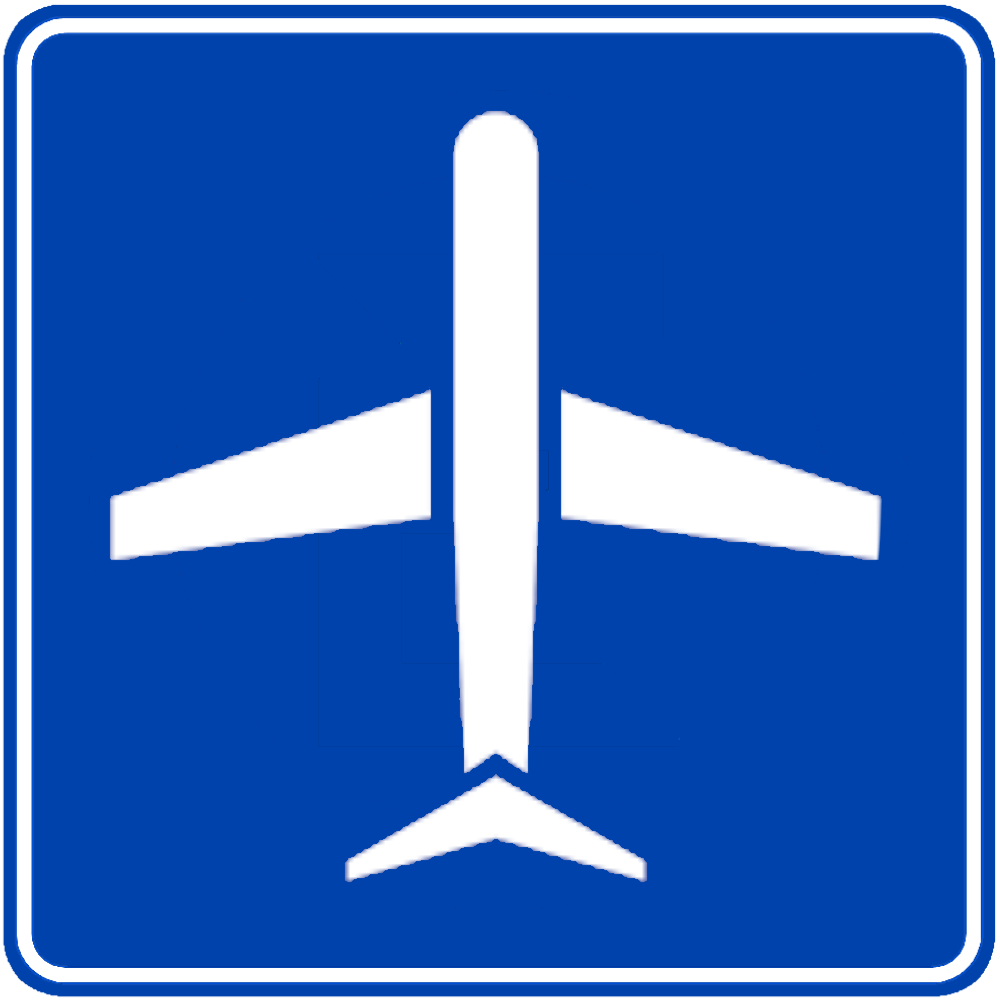
SIS-1: Airport

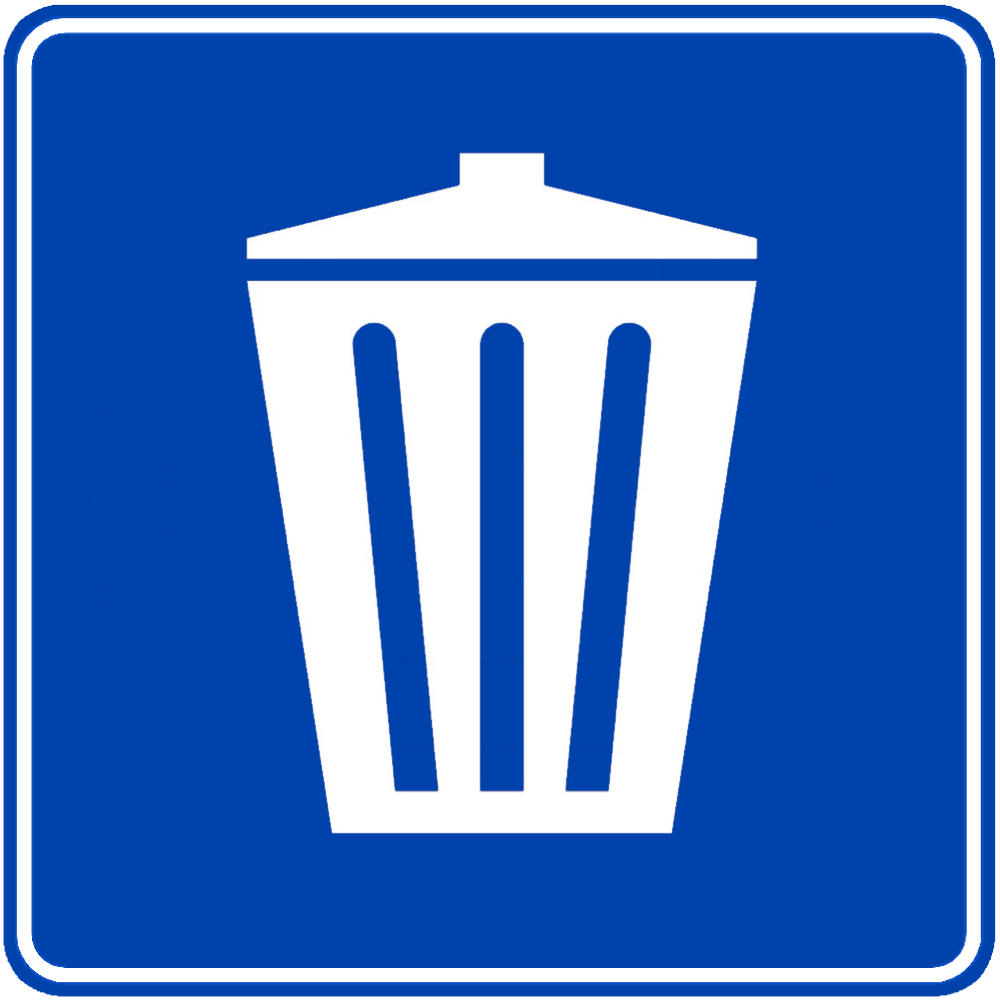
SIS-7: Litter container

SIS-8: Parking zone

SIS-10: Rail station

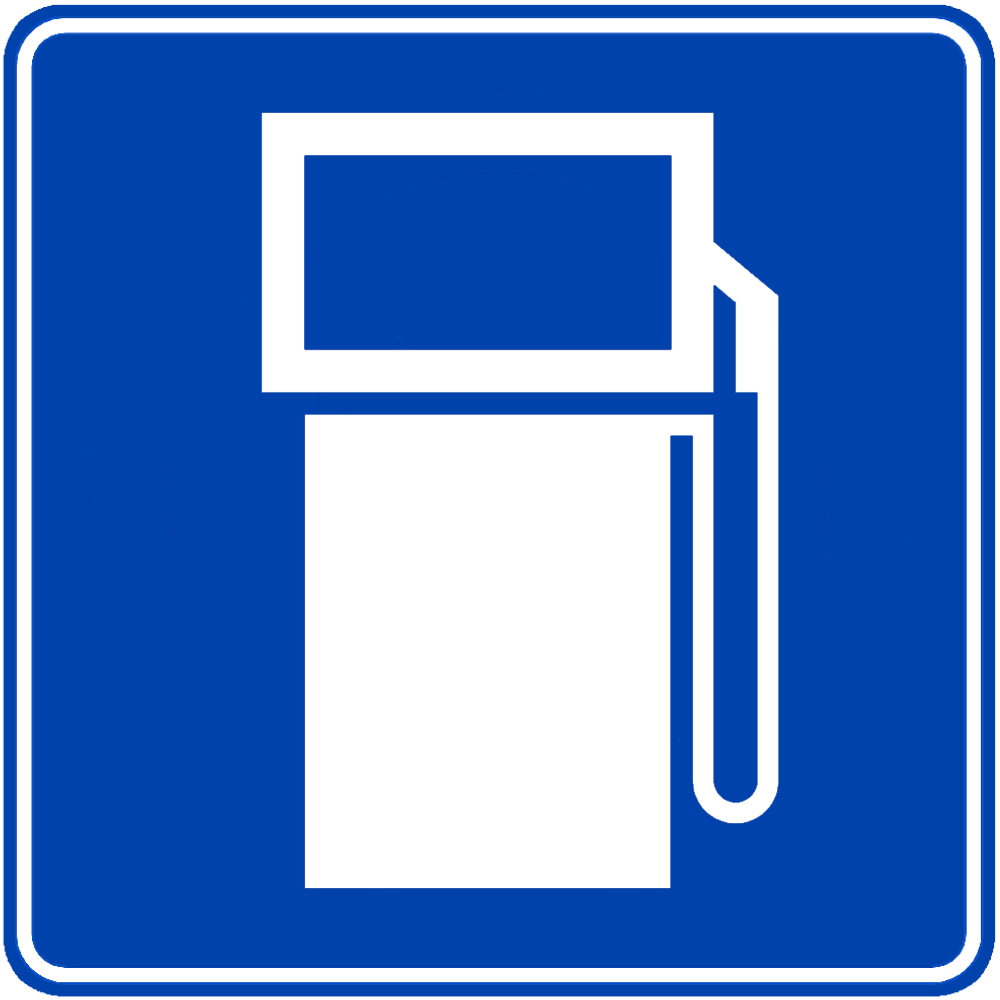
SIS-11: Gas station

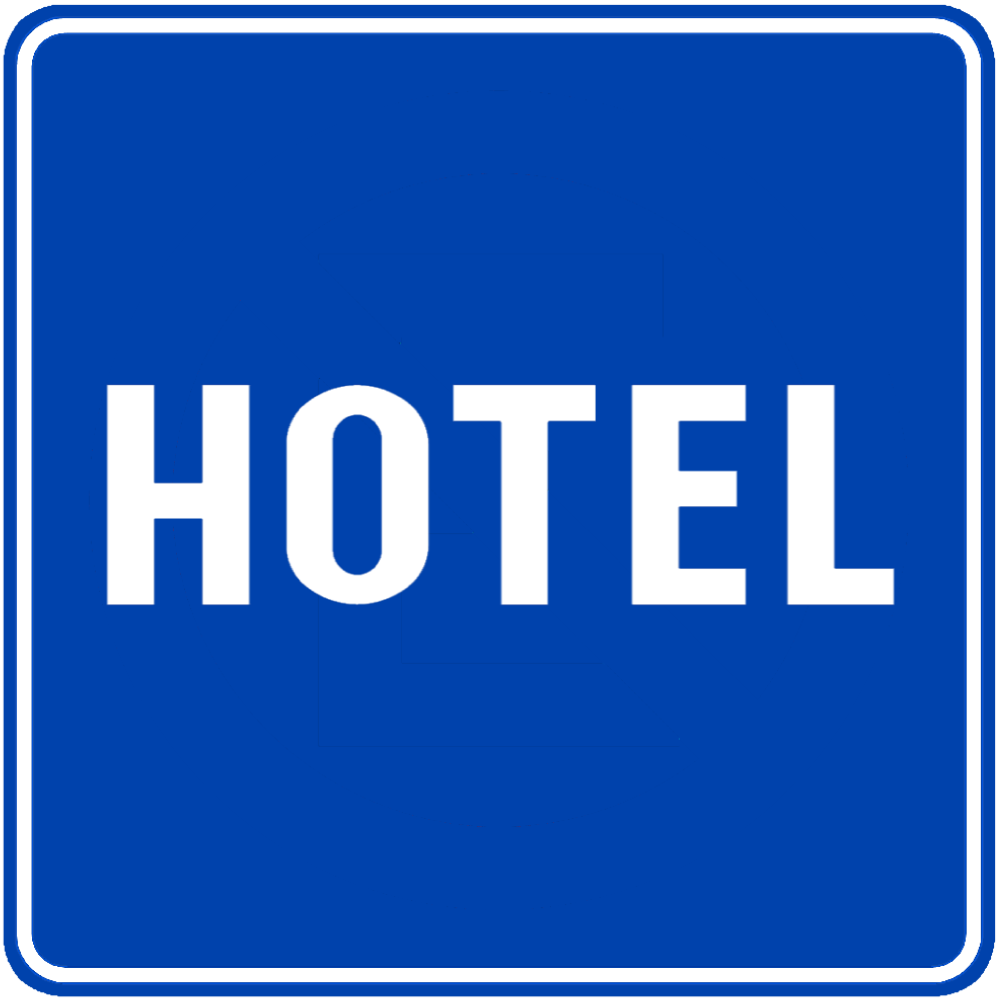
SIS-13: Hotel

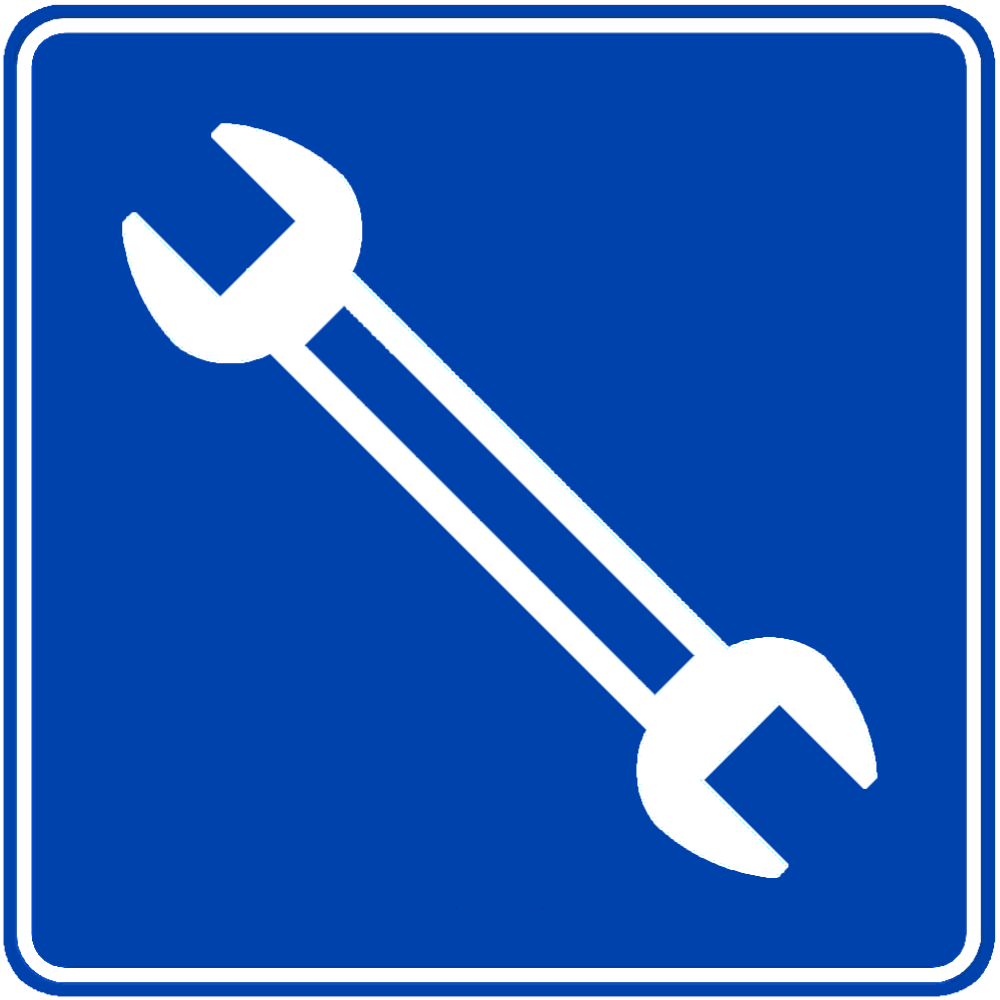
SIS-16: Car repair

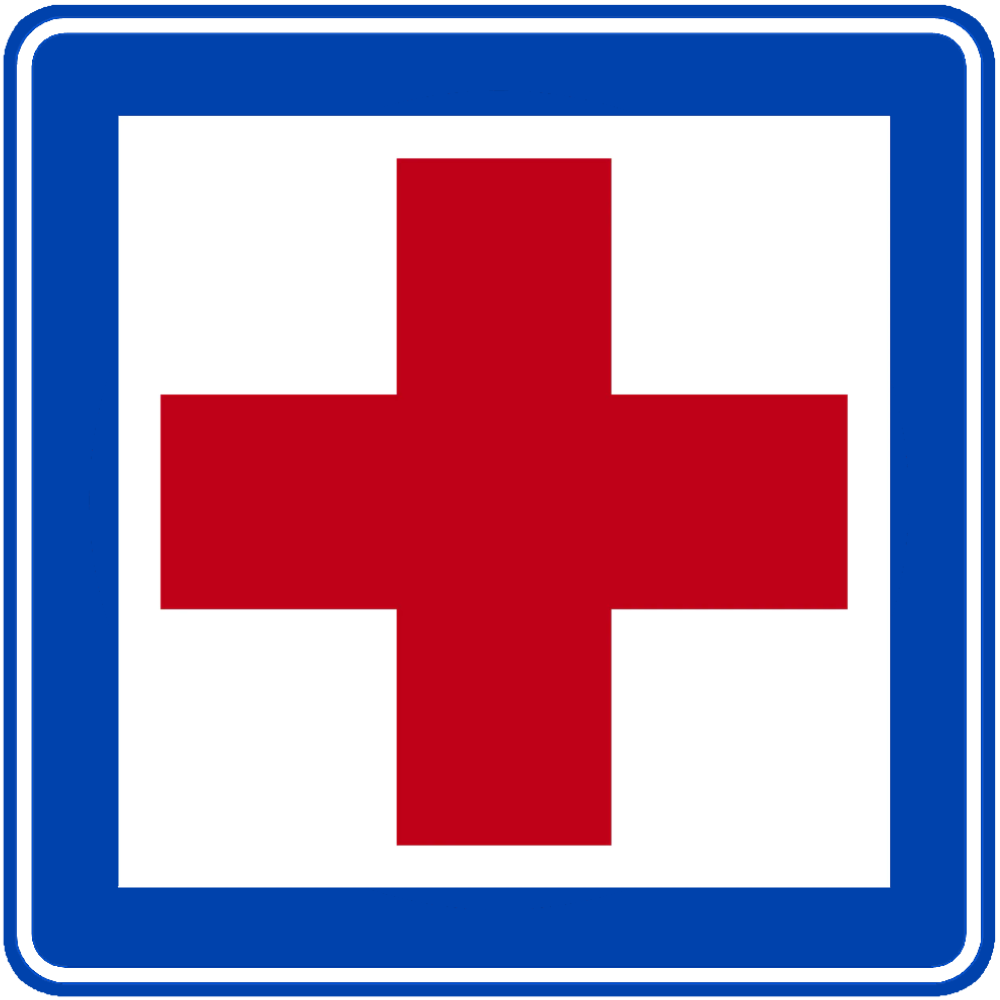
SIS-17: Hospital

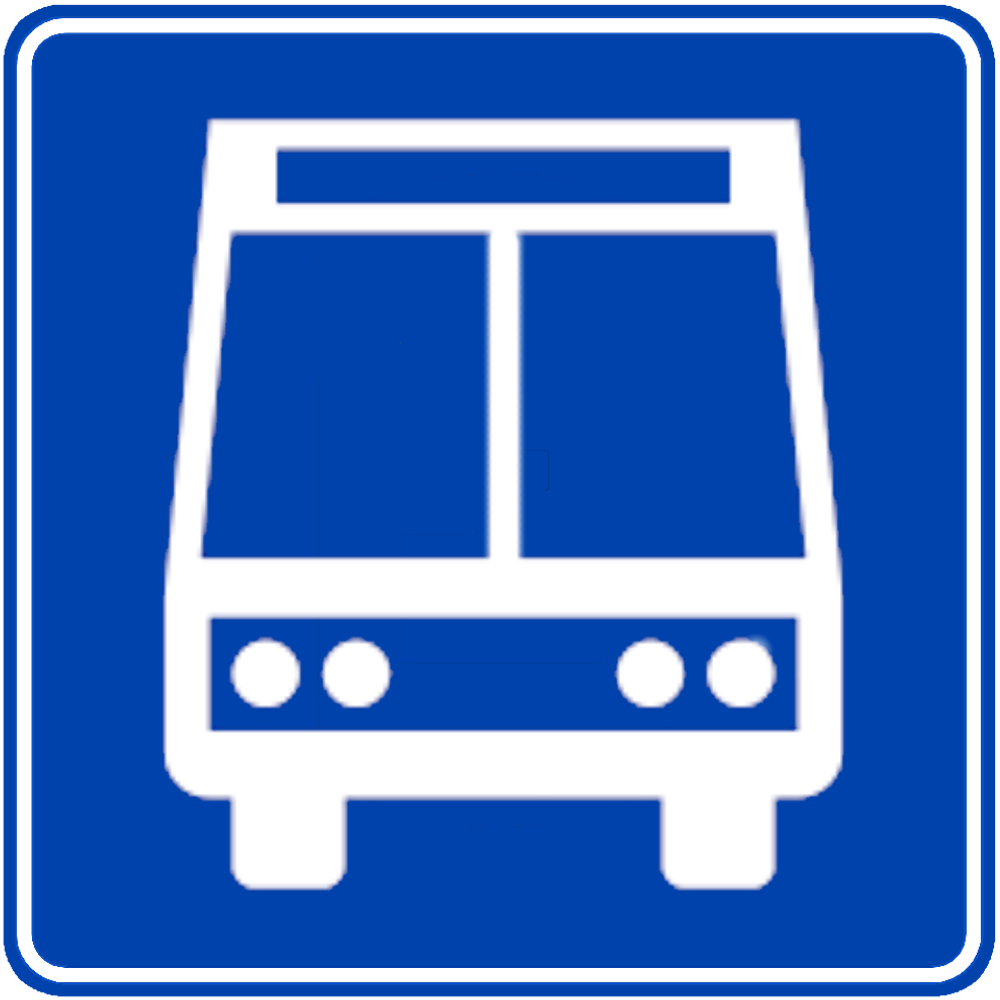
SIS-19: Bus stop

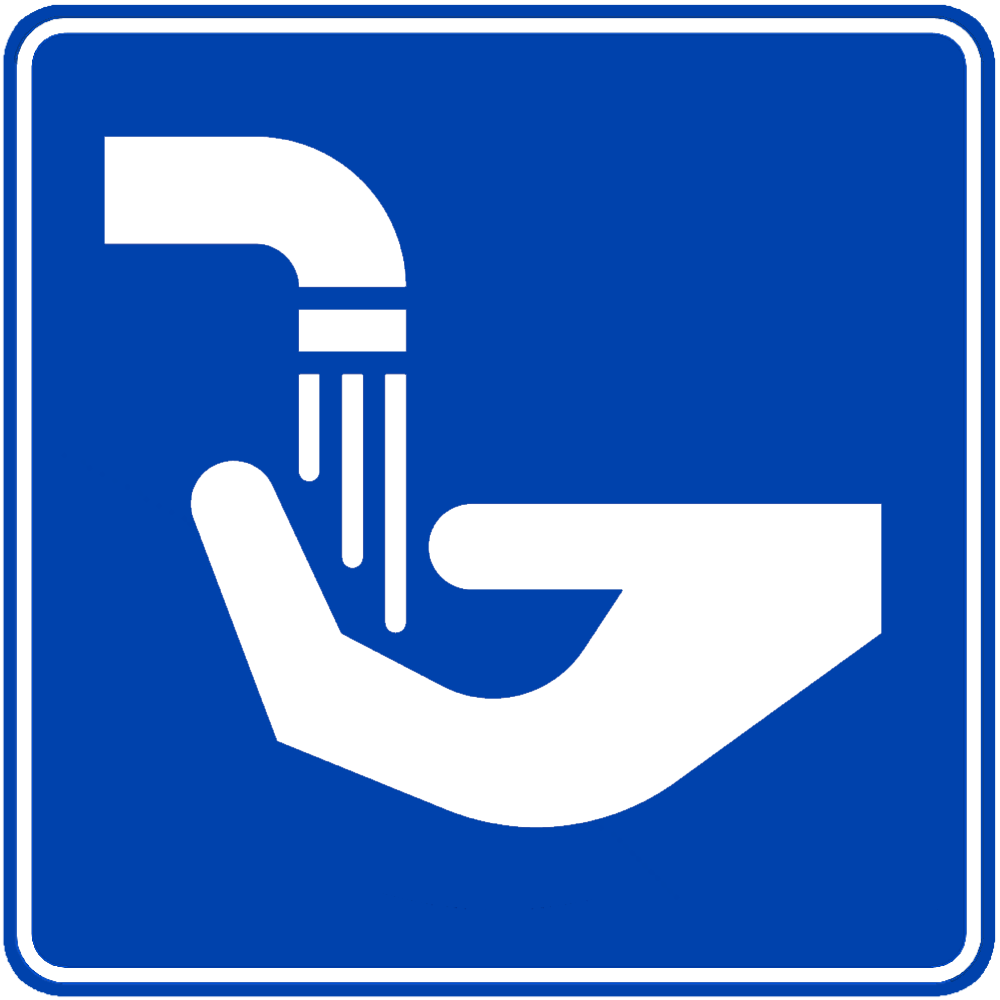
SIS-23: Restrooms

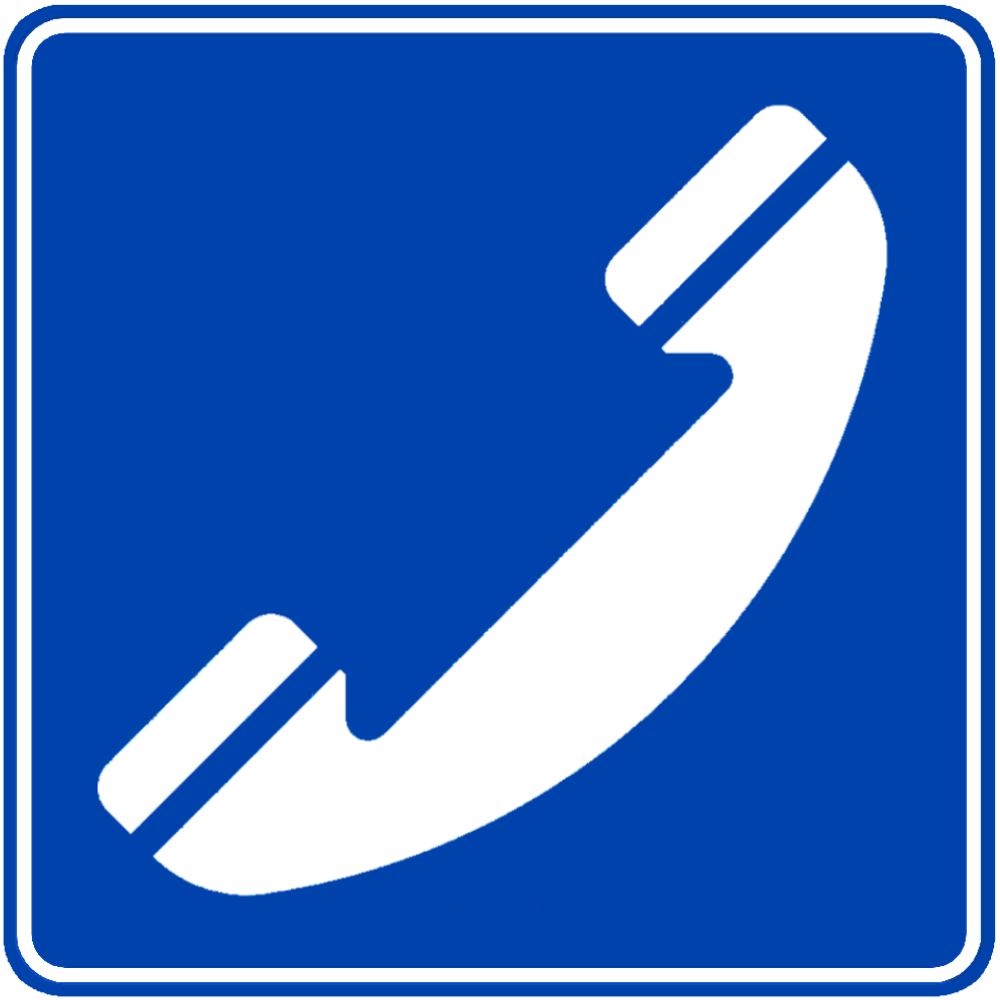
SIS-26: Payphone

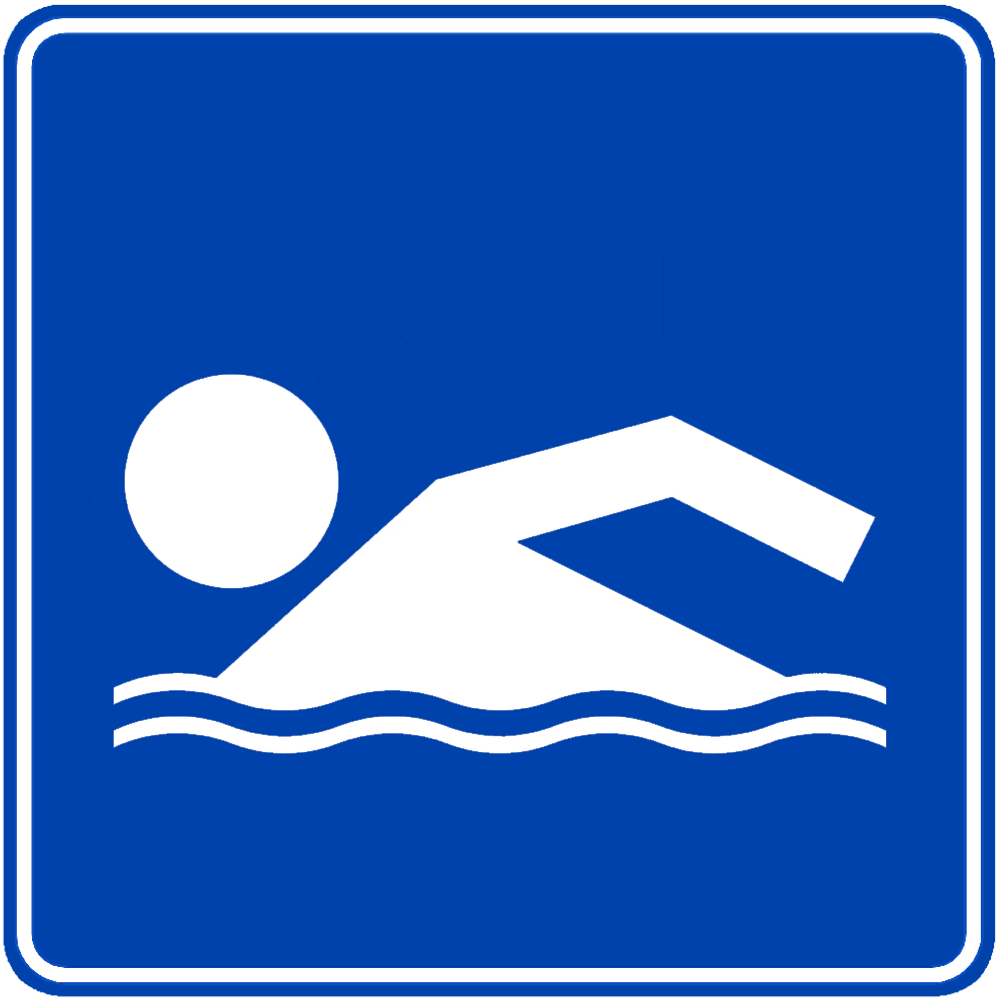
SIT-3: Pool

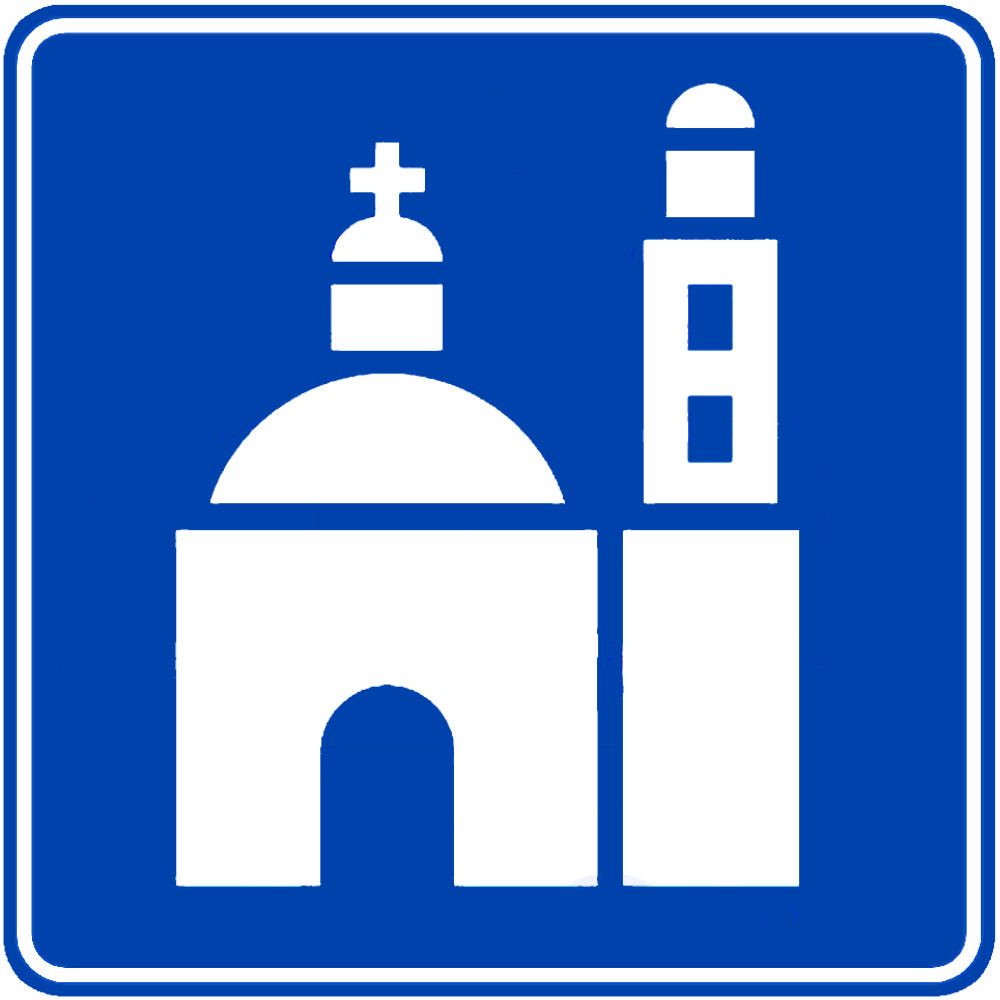
SIT-7: Colonial monument

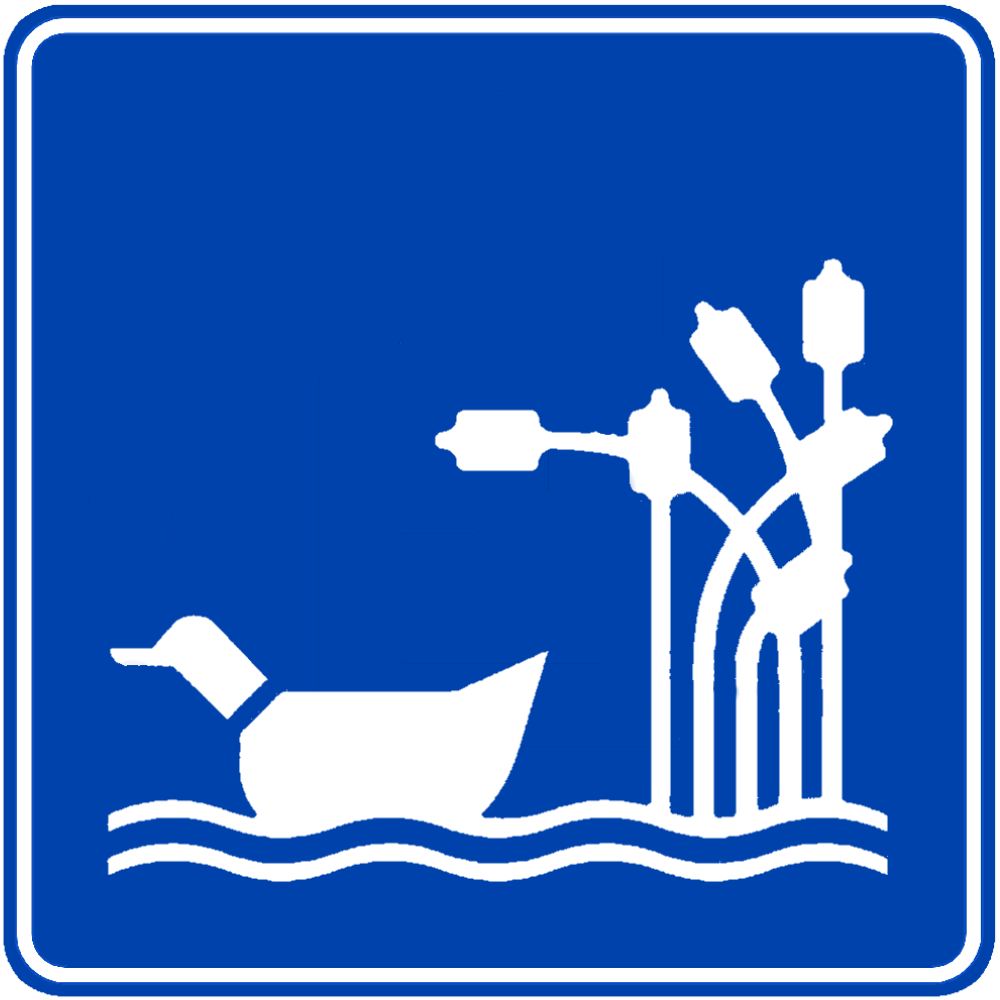
SIT-6: Lake

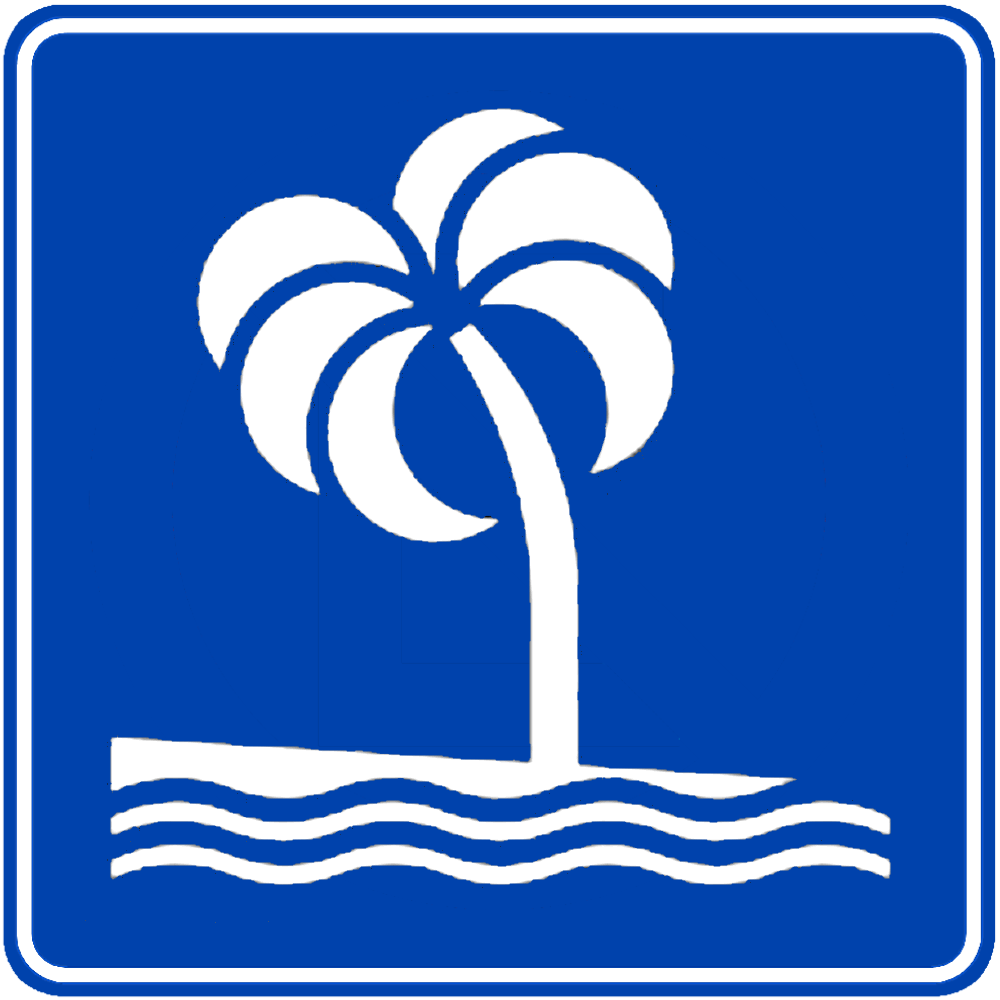
SIT-9: Beach

SP-6: Curve (left)

SP-6: Curve (right)

SP-7: Sharp curve (left)

SP-7: Sharp curve (right)

SP-8: Reverse curve (left)

SP-8: Reverse curve (right)

SP-9: Sharp reverse curve (left)

SP-9: Sharp reverse curve (right)

SP-10: Winding road (left)

SP-10: Winding road (right)

SP-16: Roundabout

SP-10A: Exit ahead (left)

SP-11: Crossroads

SP-19: Exit ahead (right)

SP-20: Symmetrical road narrows

SP-21: Asymmetrical road narrows

SP-30: Falling rocks

SP-31: Stop sign ahead

SP-31a: Yield sign ahead

SP-32: Pedestrians

SP-33: School crossing

SP-34: Domestic livestock

SP-35: Railroad crossing

SP-36: Tractors

SP-37: Traffic signals ahead

SP-38: Divided road begins

SP-38a: Fork

SP-38b: Divided road ends

SP-39: Cyclists

SP-40: Loose chippings

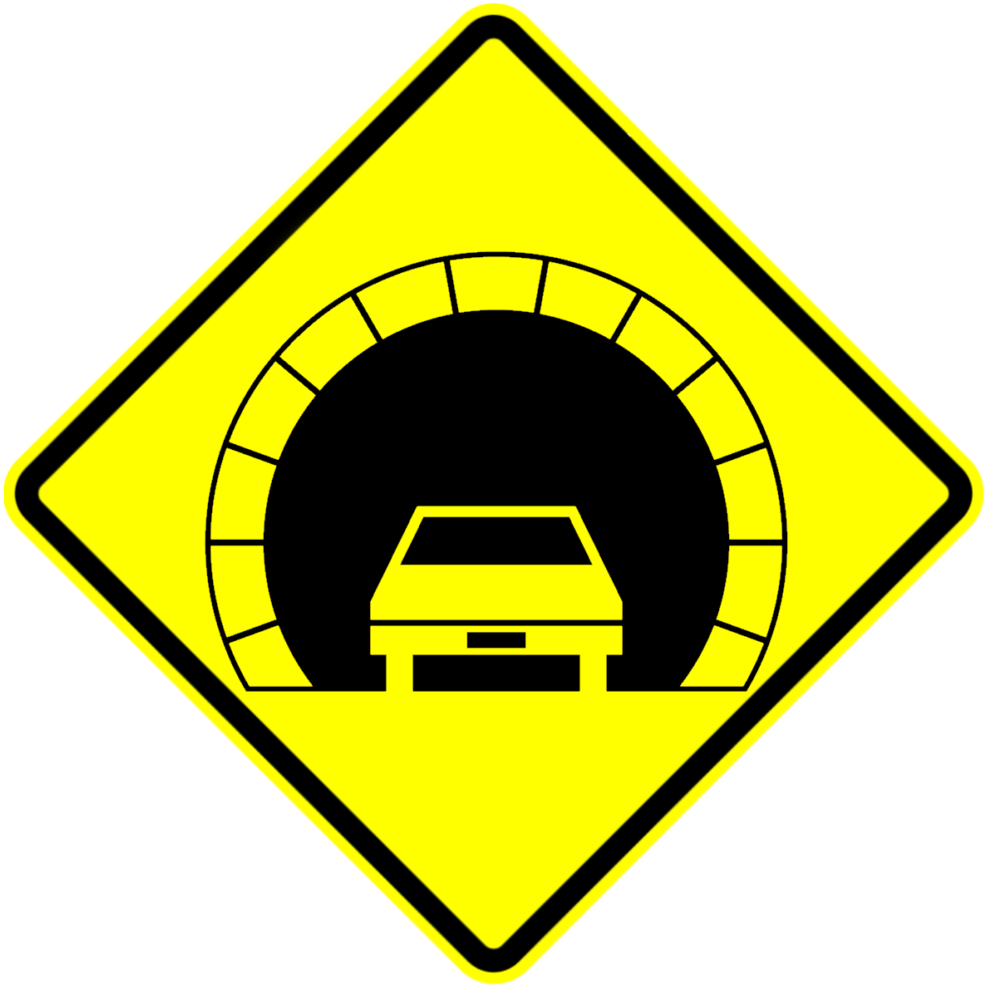
SP-42: Tunnel ahead

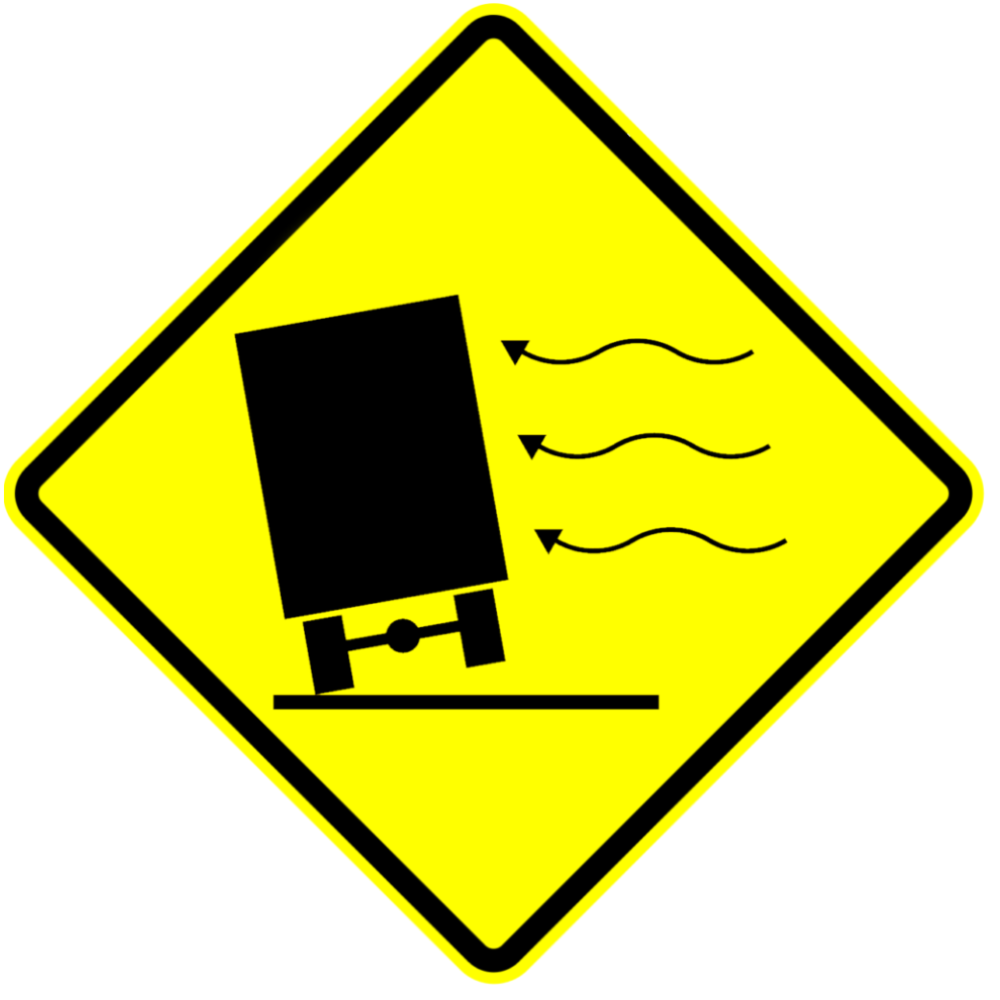
SP-43: Dangerous crosswinds

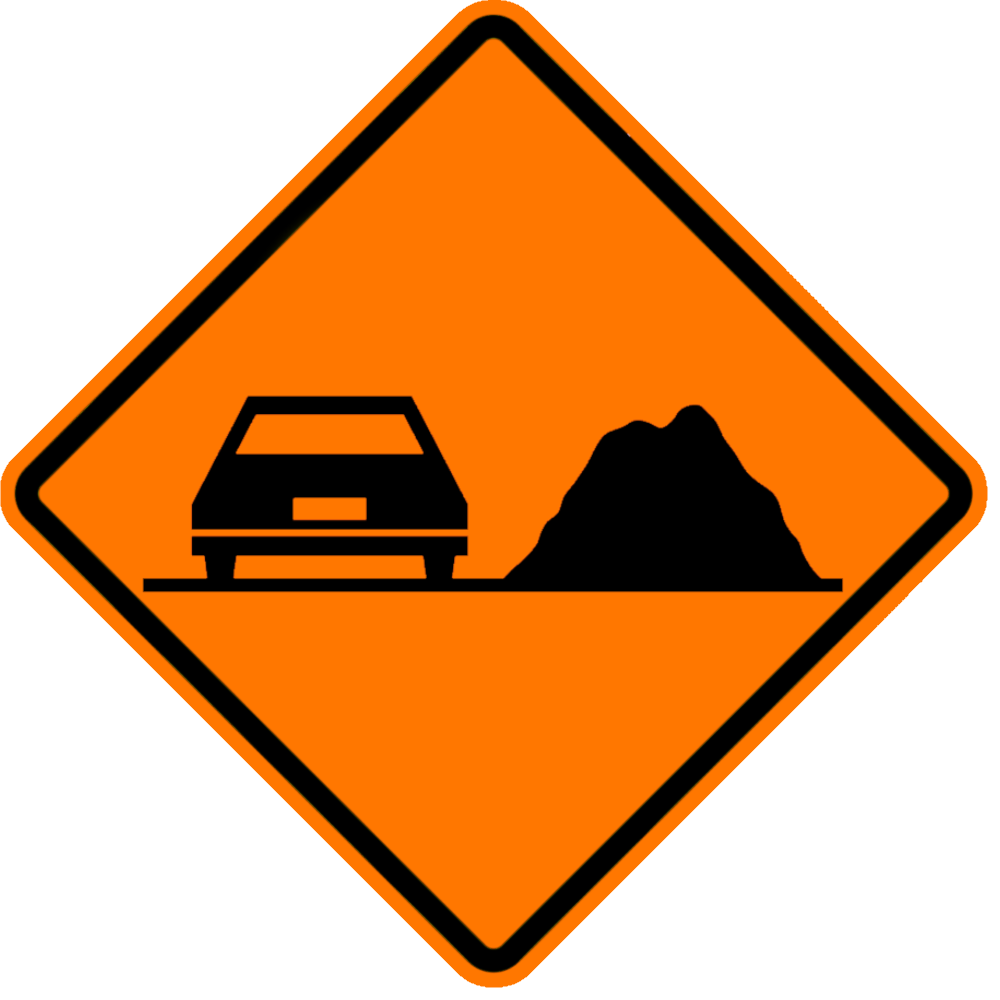
PP-2: Pile of materials on the way

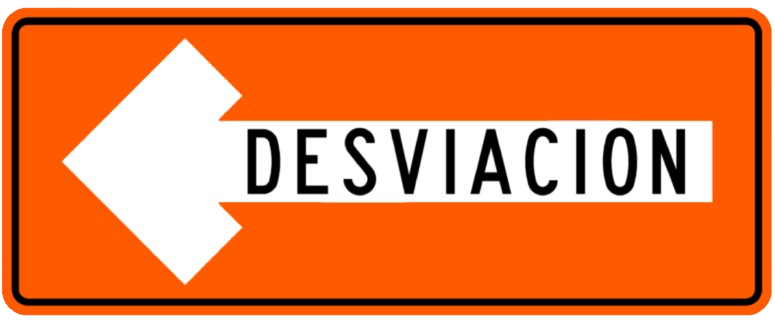
SIP-8: Detour (upper case letters)

SIR-1: Railroad crossing

SR-6: Stop

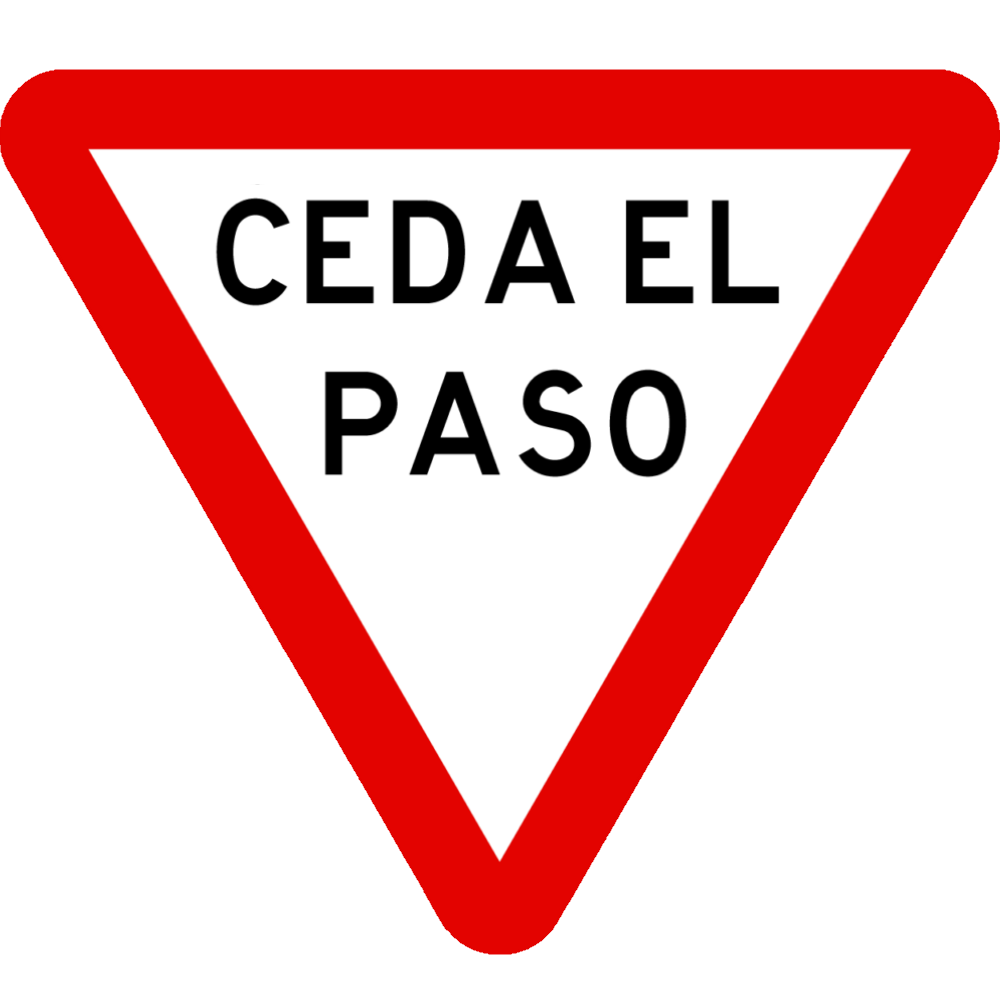
SR-7: Yield

SR-6: Stop (older version)

SR-8: Customs

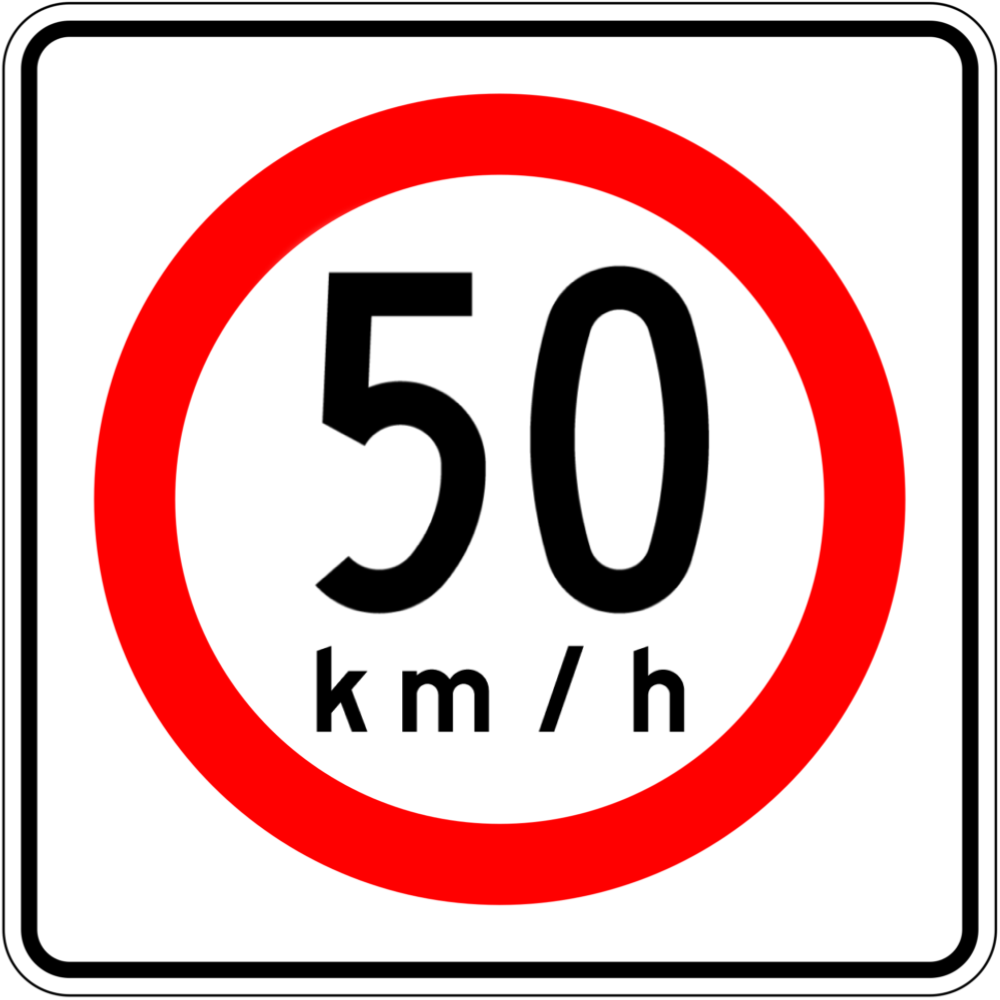
SR-9: Speed limit

SR-10: Right turn on red

SR-12: Left turn only

SR-14: Two-way traffic

SR-16: Width limit

SR-17: Weight limit

SR-18A2: Do not pass

SR-19A1: Passenger vehicles prohibited from stopping

SR-23: Right turn prohibited

SR-24: Left turn prohibited

SR-27: Pedal cycles, heavy vehicles and motorcycles prohibited

SR-27A: Motorcycles prohibited

SR-28: Animal-drawn vehicles prohibited

SR-29: Agricultural vehicles prohibited

SR-30: Pedal cycles prohibited

SR-31: Pedestrians prohibited

SR-32: Heavy vehicles prohibited

SR-37: One way

Advance directional sign (upper case letters)
