= Gridlock =

Form of traffic congestion

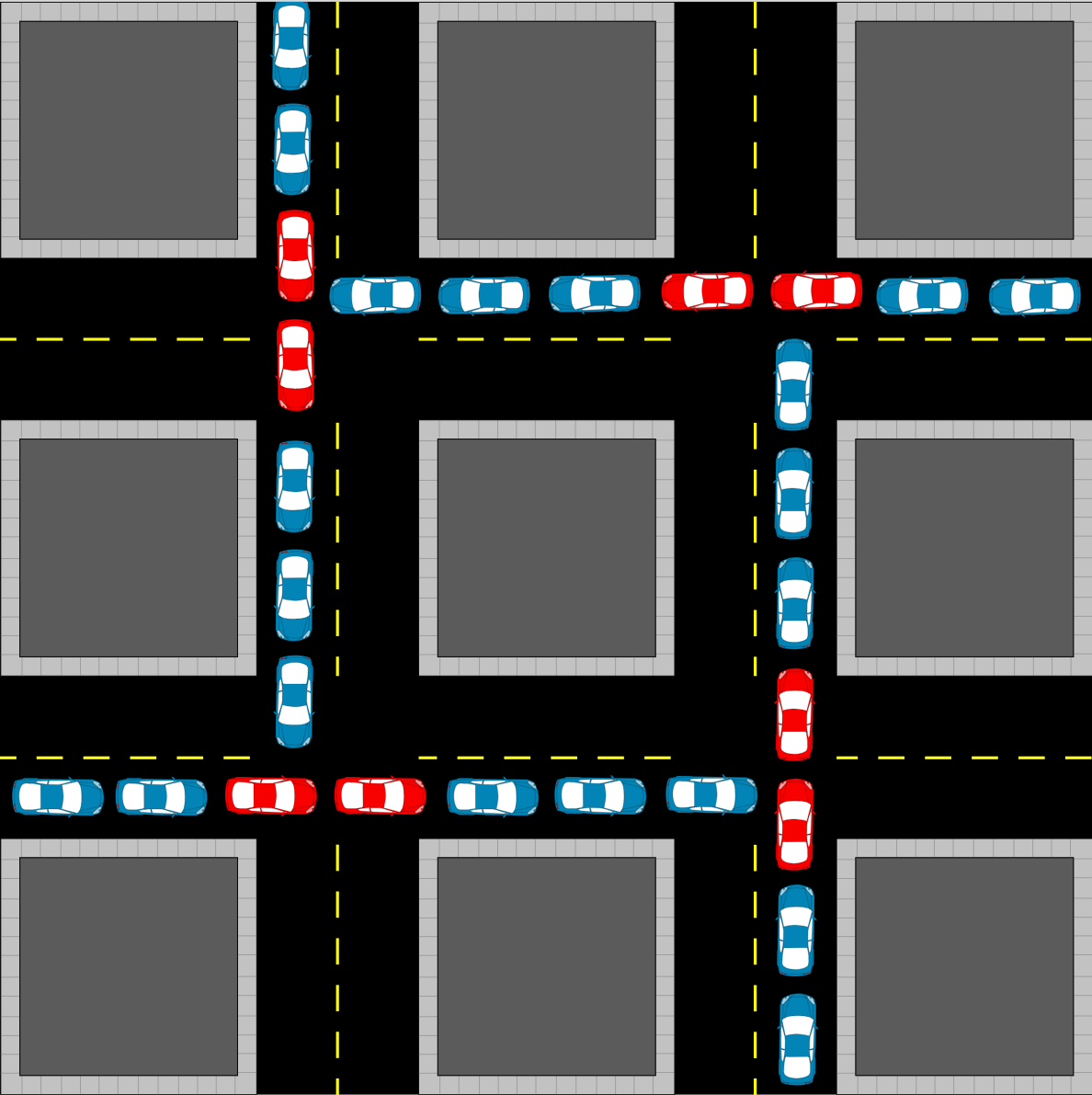
Gridlock on a network of two-way streets. The red cars are those causing the gridlock by stopping in the middle of the intersection.

Gridlock is a form of traffic congestion where continuous queues of vehicles block an entire network of intersecting streets, bringing traffic in all directions to a complete standstill. The term originates from a situation possible in a grid plan where intersections are blocked, preventing vehicles from either moving forwards through the intersection or backing up to an upstream intersection.

The term gridlock is also used to describe high traffic congestion with minimal flow (which is simply a traffic jam), where a blocked grid system is not involved. By extension, the term has been applied to situations in other fields where flow is stalled by excess demand, or in which competing interests prevent progress.

== Cause ==
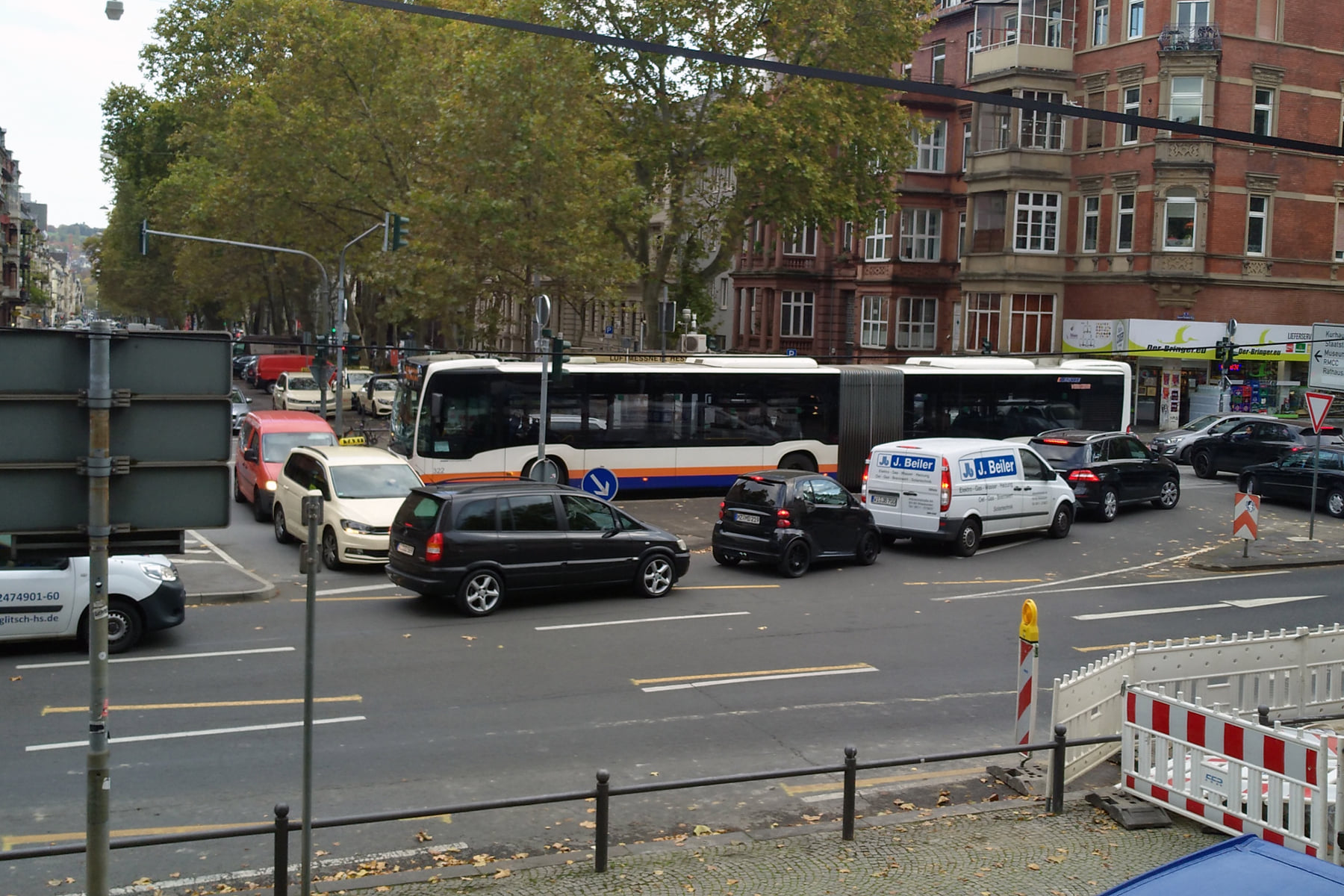
Gridlock on Kaiser-Friedrich-Ring, Wiesbaden, Germany. Vehicles on three lanes blocking each other's way.

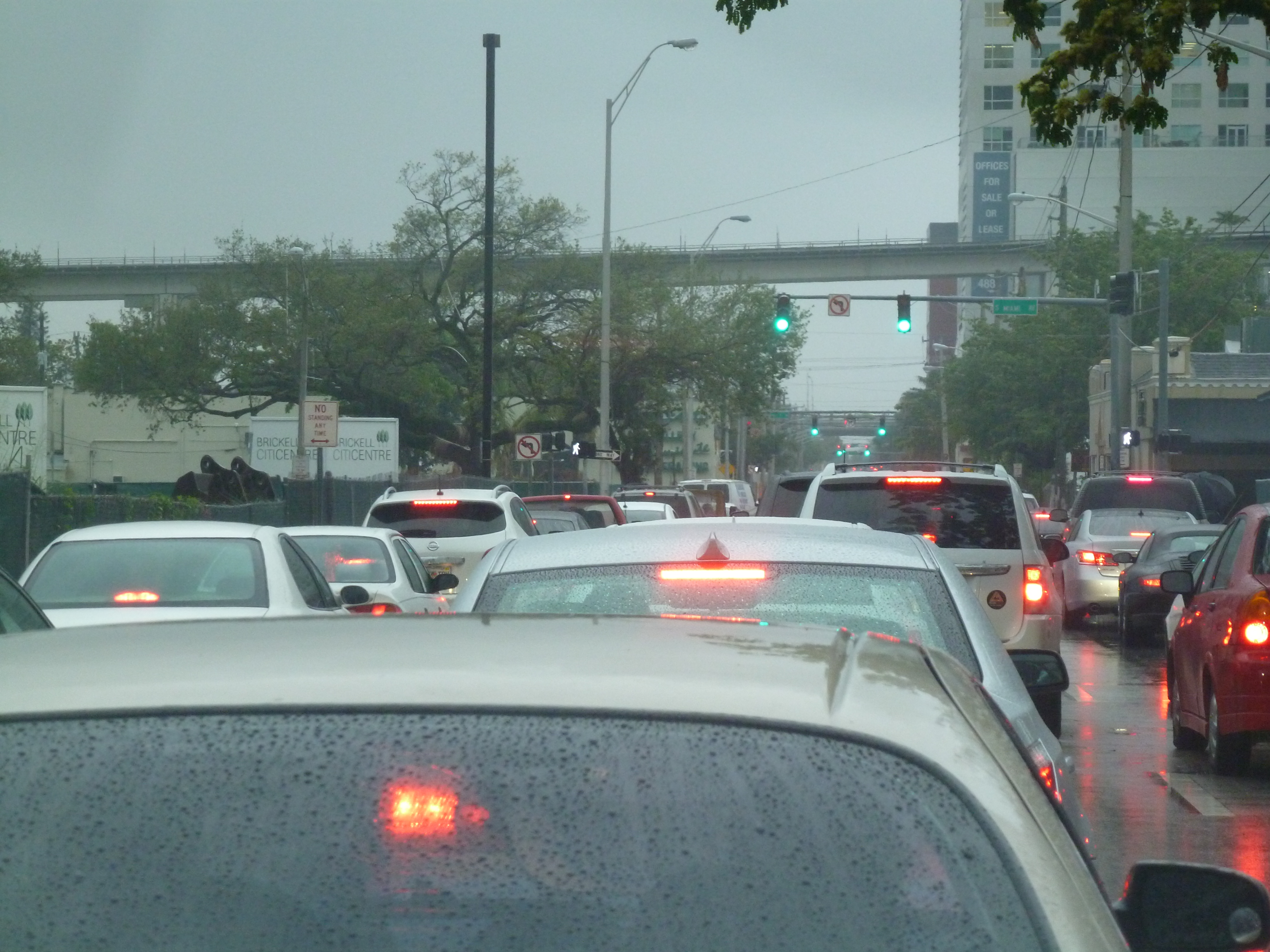
Traffic gridlock in Miami, Florida. Lights are green but backups fill all the space.

Traditional gridlock is caused by cars entering an intersection on a green light without enough room on the other side of the intersection at the time of entering to go all the way through. This can lead to the car being trapped in the intersection when the light turns green in the other direction. If the same situation occurs simultaneously in multiple intersections, these cars can be trapped in the intersections indefinitely.

In many jurisdictions, drivers are therefore prohibited from entering an intersection at a green light if there is no room for them to clear the intersection. If all drivers follow this rule, gridlock is impossible.

Another type of gridlock can occur during traffic surges between highway on-ramps and off-ramps located within a quarter mile of each other. Traffic exiting the highway may back up and block the entering vehicles. Those entering vehicles in turn back up and block the exiting vehicles.

Gridlock is sometimes cited as an example of the prisoner's dilemma (from game theory). Mutual cooperation among drivers would give the maximum benefit (prevention of gridlock), but this may not happen because of the desire to maximize one's own benefit (shortest travel time) given the uncertainty about the other drivers' commitment to equal cooperation.

== Worst episodes ==
The August 2010 China National Highway 110 traffic jam in Hebei province caught media attention for its severity, stretching more than 100 kilometres (62 mi) from August 14 to 26, including at least 11 days of total gridlock. The event was caused by a combination of road works and thousands of coal trucks from Inner Mongolia's coalfields that travel daily to Beijing. The New York Times has called this event the "Great Chinese Gridlock of 2010."

The Hebei gridlock episode is regarded as the worst in history by duration, and is one of the longest in length after the 175 kilometres (109 mi) long Lyon-Paris traffic jam on the A6 autoroute in France on February 16, 1980. Thousands of vacationing skiers were returning from the French Alps, traveling north along A6, along with normal Saturday traffic. Starting with the 1981 edition of the Guinness Book of World Records, the incident was reported under the category of "Longest Traffic Jam".

New York City suffered severe traffic gridlock episodes during the 1965, 1977, and 2003 blackouts that immediately paralyzed the city. With total traffic lights failure, bridges and tunnels locked up, and stranded subway commuters flooding the avenues, local intersections devolved into massive, motionless jams.

== Enforcement ==
=== New York City ===
Don't block the box sign

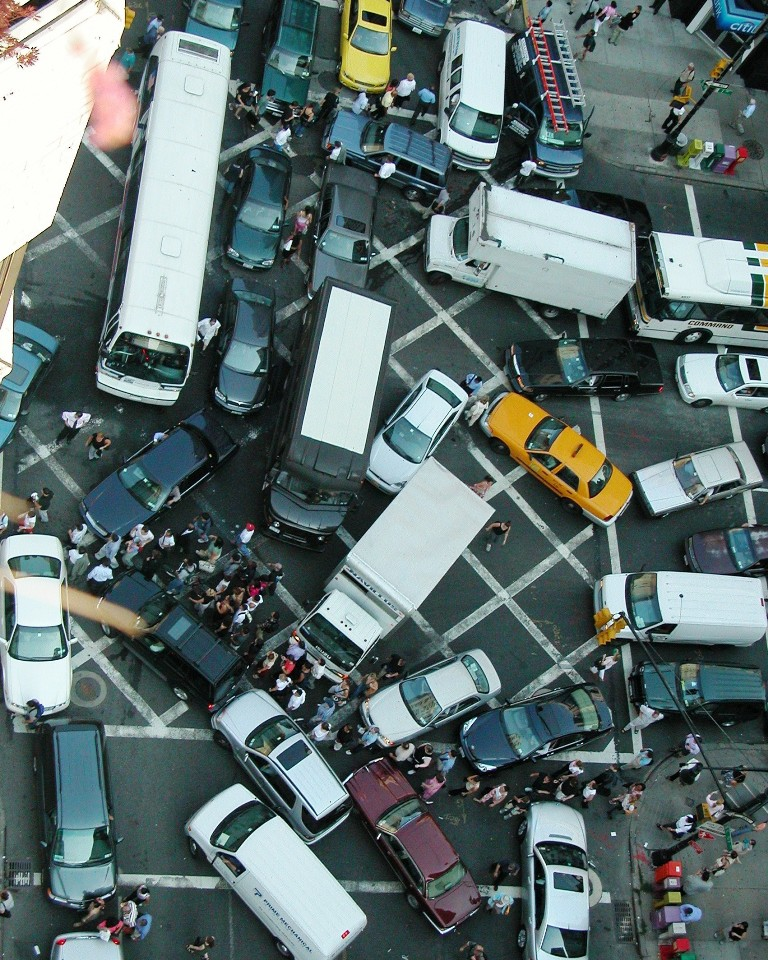
Vehicles "blocking the box" in New York City

In New York City, drivers who "block the box" are subject to a moving violation that comes with a US$90.00 penalty. Mayor Michael Bloomberg, noting that the ten-minute ticketing process actually contributes to overall traffic congestion, has asked the New York State Legislature to remove "blocking the box" from the moving violation category. This reclassification would give more traffic agents authority to write tickets and change the current ticketing procedure, which requires that the issuing officer physically stop the violating car in traffic.

=== Virginia Beach, Virginia ===
In Virginia Beach, Virginia, roads around the oceanfront feature signs at every intersection stating "Don't Block the Box", and threatening a $200 fine.

=== Texas ===
In Austin, Texas, a "Don't Block the Box" initiative began in 2015. A similar program was piloted in San Antonio in 2017.

== Effects ==
The obvious effects are driver frustration and trip delay. Another effect in cities is exacerbated by the presence of urban street canyons, which effectively trap air pollution and increase air pollution exposures of motorists as well as the general urban population. Noise pollution can be aggravated by excessive starting and stopping noise of gridlocked facilities.

== Alleviating gridlock ==
To make a traffic system less susceptible to gridlock, a traffic metering system can be introduced. These systems determine the optimal number of vehicles allowed in a traffic system, and prevent any extra vehicles from entering. This can be done with traffic control devices, such as traffic lights or warning signs, or a better public transportation system. This type of system is used in Zurich, Switzerland.

== Etymology ==
According to The New York Times, the word gridlock was coined in New York City in the early 1970s. The word appeared in an IEEE publication in 1971 in a different context. The first appearances of gridlock in newspapers occurred during the 1980 New York City transit strike. The word is attributed to Sam Schwartz, who was then the chief traffic engineer for the New York City Department of Transportation at the time of the strike. Schwartz said the word gridlock was used internally in his department during the 1970s, perhaps as early as 1971. Writing up a memo of emergency recommendations for senior officials, he recalled the words of a colleague several years earlier who had been analyzing a proposal to close Broadway to vehicular traffic. His colleague gave the plan the thumbs-down, worrying that it would simply "lock up the grid". Schwartz was always struck by that image and titled his 1980 memo "Gridlock Prevention Plan". In another interview Mr. Schwartz said that he coined the term in the mid 1970s with fellow traffic engineer, Roy Cottam, who "was a little paranoid and thought he would be blamed for gridlock and so he gave me all the credit".

== See also ==
- Box junction
- Deadlock - computer software analogy
- Journal of Transport and Land Use
- Roadway air dispersion modeling
- Rush Hour (puzzle)
