= Road signs in Colombia =

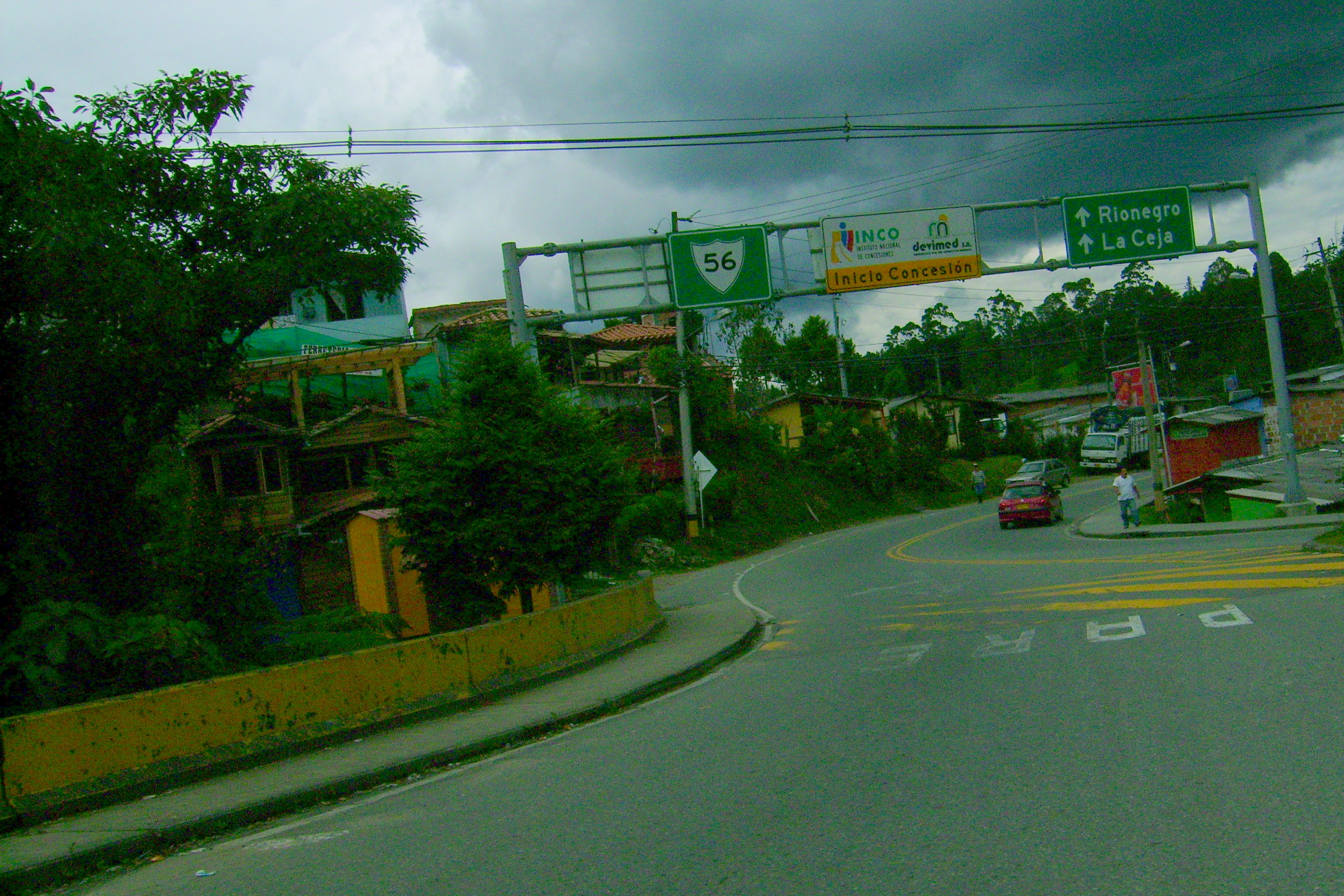
Start of the concession of National Route 56 in Alto de las Palmas, Envigado, Antioquia, Colombia.

Road signs in Colombia are regulated in the Manual de Señalización Vial standard, developed by the Ministry of Transport and the National Road Safety Agency and based on the United States' MUTCD. Many regulatory signs are based on European signs, i.e. the Vienna Convention on Road Signs and Signals, while many warning signs are based on U.S. and Canadian signs, i.e. on MUTCD.

Colombia uses the metric system of measurement and drives on the right.

== Regulatory signs ==
SR-01 Stop

SR-02 Give way

SR-03 Obligated direction or go straight

SR-04 No entry

SR-05 Turn left

SR-06 No left turn

SR-07 Turn right

SR-08 No right turn

SR-09 U-turn only

SR-10 No U-turn

SR-11 Two-way traffic

SR-12 Three lanes (one contraflow)

SR-13 Three lanes (two contraflow)

SR-14 Lane change prohibited

SR-16 No motor vehicles, except motorcycles

SR-17 Trucks, keep right

SR-18 No trucks

SR-19 Pedestrians crossing on the left

SR-20 No pedestrians

SR-21 No equestrians

SR-22 No bicycles

SR-23 No motorcycles

SR-24 No tractors

SR-25 No animal-drawn vehicles

SR-26 No overtaking

SR-28 No parking

SR-28A No stopping

SR-29 No honking

SR-30 Speed limit

SR-30A Minimum speed limit

SR-30B Speed limit on exit ramps

SR-31 Maximum weight

SR-32 Maximum height

SR-33 Maximum width

SR-34 Taxi parking zone

SR-35 Low-beam headlights required

SR-36 Stop ahead (e.g. customs, police, toll)

SR-37 Bicycles only

SR-38 One-way street

SR-38-R One-way street

SR-39 Two-way street

SR-40 Passenger pick up drop-off zone

SR-41 Passenger pick up drop-off prohibited

SR-42 Loading and unloading zone

SR-43 Loading and unloading prohibited

SR-44 Keep a safe distance

SR-45 Pass only on the left of barrier

SR-46 Pass only on the right of barrier

SR-47 Do not block intersection

SR-48 End of overtaking prohibition

SR-49 Priority from oncoming traffic

SR-50 Turn right on red prohibited

SR-51 No handcarts

SR-52 No buses

SR-53 No motorcarts

SR-54 No quadmotors

SRO-01 Road closed

SRO-03 Merger one by one

SRO-04 Stop/Go manual traffic control

SRC-01 Cyclists, keep right

SRC-02 Bicycle dismount

SRC-03 Segregated pedestrian and bicycle path

SRC-03B Segregated pedestrian and bicycle path

SRC-04 No pets

SRC-05 Shared pedestrian and bicycle path

SRM-01 Motorcycles only

== Warning signs ==
Warning signs are diamond-shaped as in most of the Americas.

SP-01 Sharp turn to left

SP-02 Sharp turn to right

SP-03 Curve to left

SP-04 Curve to right

SP-05 Double sharp Curve first to left

SP-06 Double sharp Curve first to right

SP-07 Winding road To left

SP-08 Winding road To right

SP-09 Double curve First to left

SP-10 Double curve First to right

SP-11 Crossroads

SP-12 Road intersects from the left

SP-13 Road intersects from the right

SP-14 "T" junction ahead

SP-15 "Y" junction ahead

SP-16 Fork to the left

SP-17 Fork to the right

SP-18 Staggered crossroads, starting with the left

SP-19 Staggered crossroads, starting with the right

SP-20 Circle road

SP-21 Merge from the left

SP-22 Merge from the right

SP-23 Traffic signals ahead

SP-24 Bumpy roadway

SP-25 Bump

SP-26 Dip

SP-27 Steep descent

SP-27A Steep ascent

SP-28 Road narrows

SP-29 Stop sign ahead

SP-30 Road narrows on the left

SP-31 Road narrows on the right

SP-32 Road narrows on wides

SP-33 Yield sign ahead

SP-34 Road widens on the left

SP-35 Road widens on the right

SP-36 Narrow bridge

SP-37 Tunnel

SP-38 Maximum weight

SP-39 Two-way traffic

SP-40 Warning sign, go left

SP-41 Three lanes, one contraflow

SP-42 Falling rock surface

SP-43 Three lanes, two contraflow

SP-44 Slippery road

SP-45 Beware of tractors and other agricultural vehicles

SP-46 Pedestrians

SP-46A Pedestrian crossing

SP-46B Pedestrian crossing

SP-47 School zone

SP-47A School crossing

SP-47B School crossing

SP-48 Children at play

SP-49 Capybaras crossing

SP-49 Castle crossing

SP-49 Deer crossing

SP-49 Lizard crossing

SP-49 Snake crossing

SP-50 Maximum height 4.50 m

SP-51 Maximum width 3.20 m

SP-52 Railroad crossing ahead

SP-53 Barrier

SP-54 Single track railroad crossing

SP-55 Beginning of dual

SP-55A Beginning of median

SP-56 End of dual

SP-56A End of median

SP-57 Pavement ends

SP-59 Cyclists

SP-59A Cyclists crossing

SP-59B Cyclists crossing

SP-67 Risk of accident

SP-68 Keep distance

SP-69 Hairpin curve to the left

SP-70 Hairpin curve to the right

SP-71 Loose gravel

SP-72 Fire station

SP-73 Strong crosswinds

SP-74 Soft verges

== Information signs ==
SI-07 Parking

SI-07A Special parking zone

SI-08 Bus stop

SI-09 Taxi parking

SI-10 Ferry

SI-11 Bike route

SI-13 Military zone

SI-14 Airport

SI-15 Lodging

SI-16 First aid

SI-17 Sanitary services

SI-18 Restaurant

SI-19 Telephone

SI-20 Church

SI-21 Auto service shop

SI-22 Petrol station

SI-23 Tire repair shop

SI-25 Pedestrian crossing designed for disabled persons

SI-25A Pedestrian crossing designed for elderly persons

SI-29 Rail transit

SI-30 Other public transit

SI-31 Recreation zone

== Other signs ==

Living street

== See also ==
- Transport in Colombia
