= Box junction =

Type of junction designed to prevent congestion of traffic

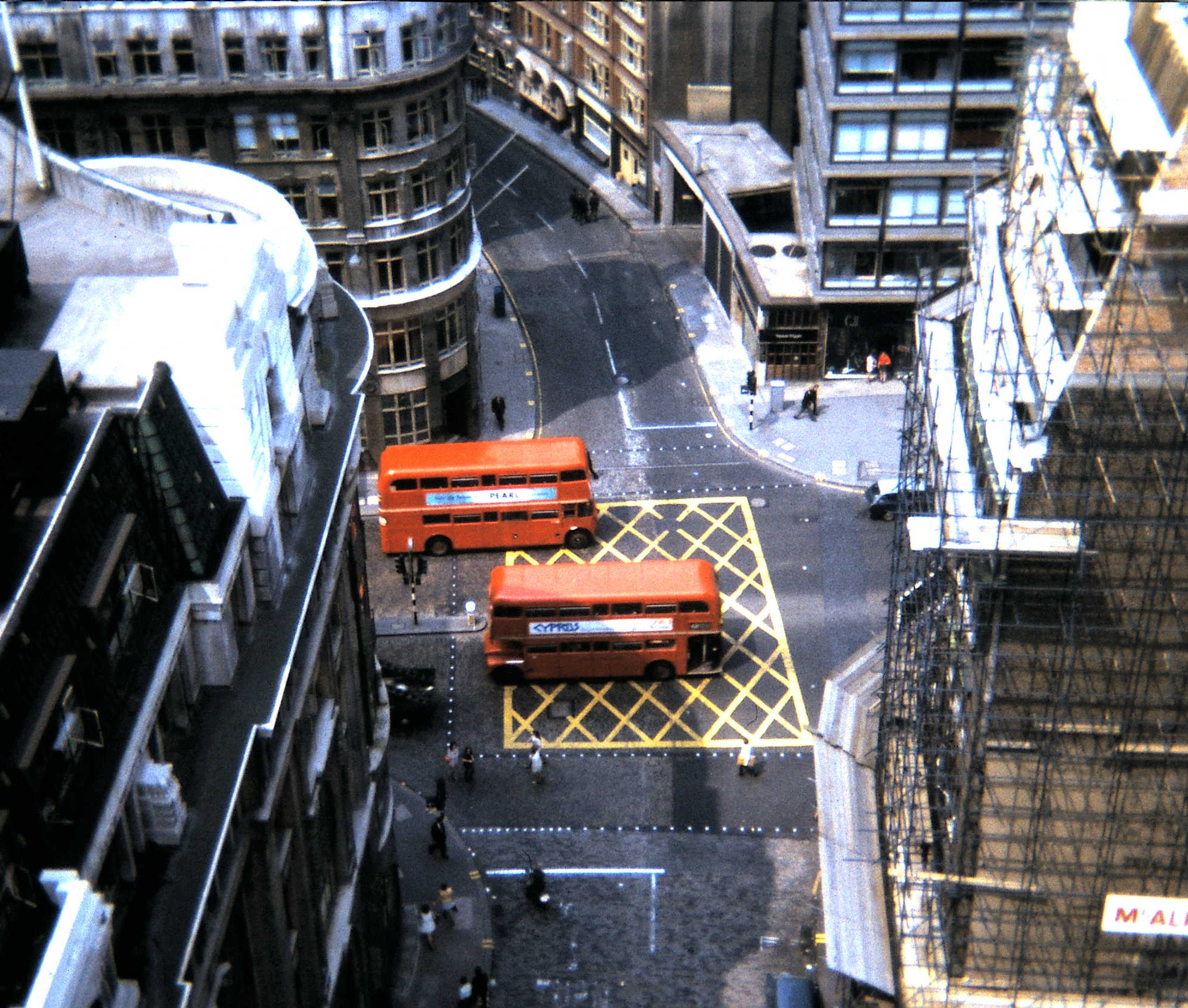
A box junction in London, pictured from atop the Monument in 1969

A box junction is a road traffic control measure designed to prevent congestion and gridlock at junctions. The surface of the junction is typically marked with a yellow criss-cross grid of diagonal painted lines (or only two lines crossing each other in the box), and vehicles may not enter the area so marked unless their exit from the junction is clear, or they are intending to turn and are prevented from doing so by oncoming traffic, or other vehicles on the box waiting to turn.

Box junctions were introduced in the UK during 1967, following a successful trial in London. In both Ireland and the United Kingdom (where cars drive on the left), drivers may enter the box and wait when they want to turn right and are stopped from doing so only by oncoming traffic or by other vehicles waiting to turn right.

Box junctions may be painted on other areas of roadway which must be kept free of queuing traffic, such as exits from emergency vehicle depots, level crossings and car parks.

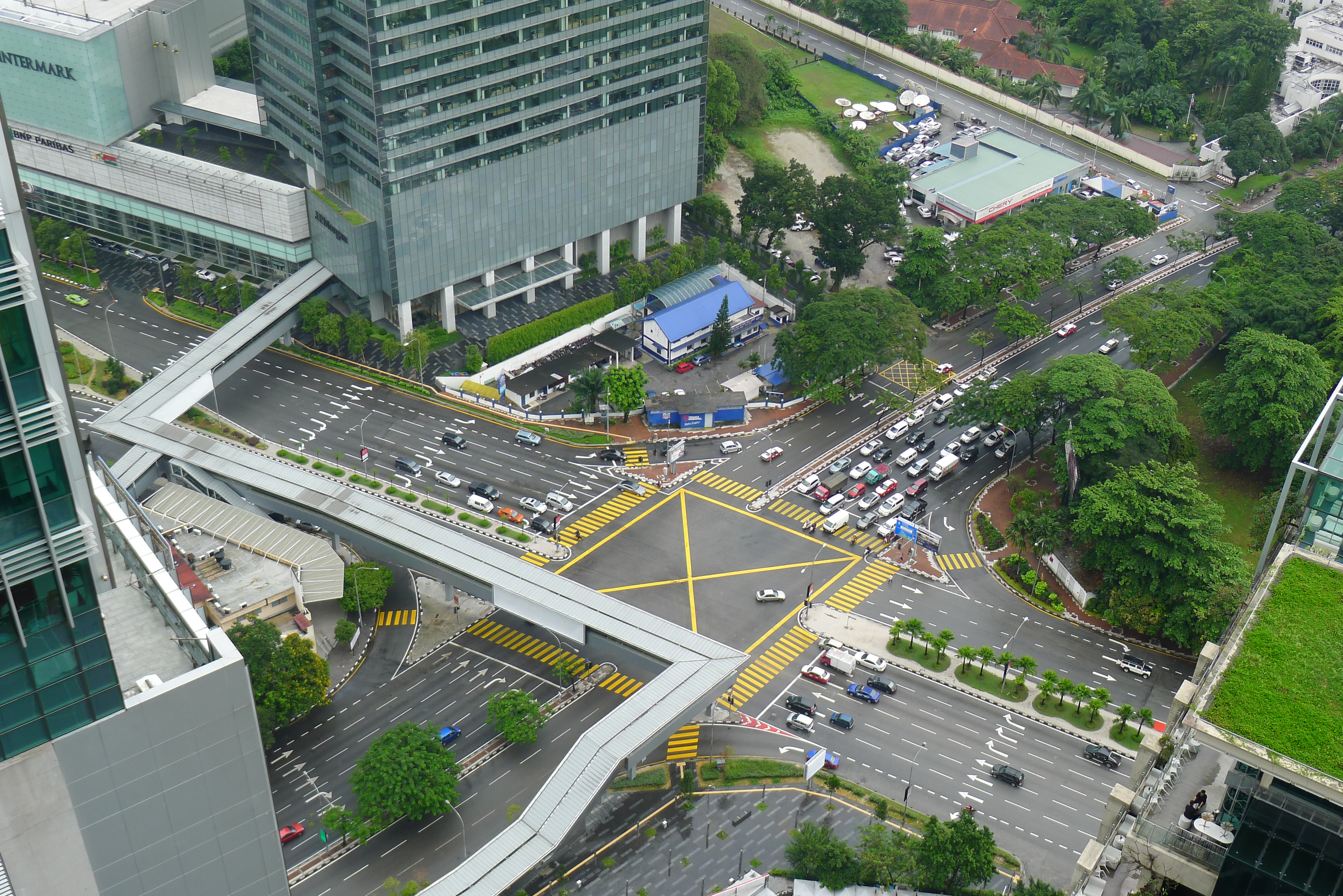
An example from Kuala Lumpur, Malaysia.

Box junctions are most widely used in many European countries such as Cyprus, Finland, Ireland, Malta, Portugal, Serbia and the United Kingdom; in Trinidad and Tobago in parts of the United States, such as New York and Colorado; and other countries, including Canada, Hong Kong, Singapore, Indonesia, Malaysia, the Philippines, South Africa, Taiwan, India and Brazil.

== Unmarked equivalents ==
A sign used in Chile warning motorists not to block a box junction

In Australia, New Zealand and the European Union (excluding Ireland), road rules state that every intersection is a box: that is, the driver may not enter any intersection unless there is clear space on the other side, whether it is marked or not. In the EU this also applies to junctions with a minor road within the waiting area of a traffic light on the major road. The same rule applies at every intersection in Russia.

Several U.S. states have enacted laws intending to decrease gridlock at intersections, railroad crossings, and marked crosswalks which prohibit motorists from entering any of the three until they are certain their vehicle can clear it, as recommended by Uniform Vehicle Code section 11–1112. Examples include California, Florida, New York, and Ohio. No special road markings are used to indicate this rule, but some governments post warning signs to increase awareness of the law at problematic intersections.
