= Road signs in Indonesia =

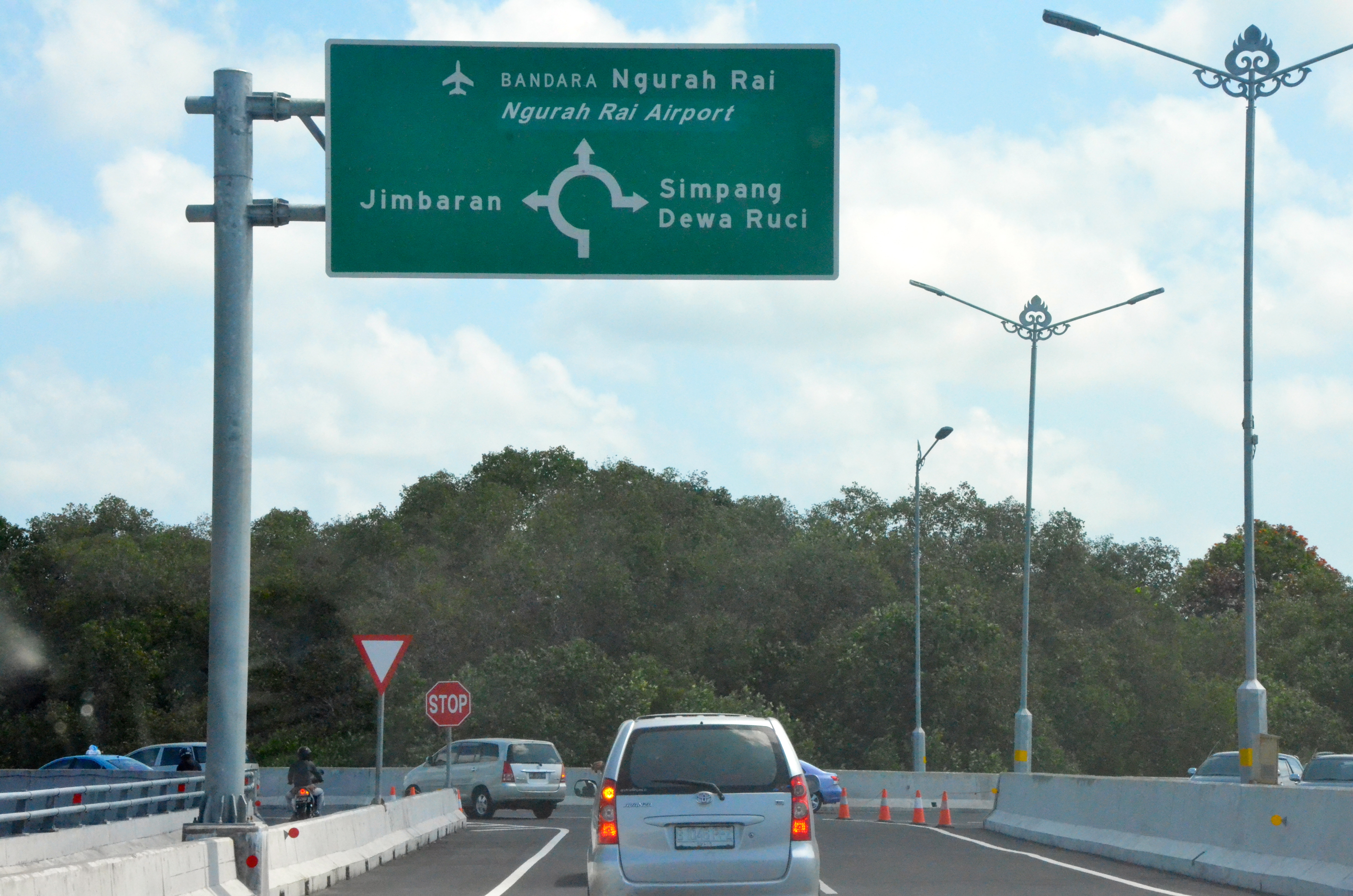
Directional sign in Badung, Bali. All directional signs in Indonesia use a green color background. Notice the give way and stop signs.

Road signs in Indonesia are standardized road signs similar to those used in other nations but with certain distinctions. As a former Dutch colony, until the 1970s road signs in Indonesia closely followed The Netherlands rules on road signs. Nowadays, Indonesian road sign design are a mix of European, US MUTCD, Australia, New Zealand and Japanese road sign features. According to the 2014 Minister of Transport's Regulation No. 13 concerning Traffic Signs, the official typeface for road signs in Indonesia is Clearview. Indonesia formerly used FHWA Series fonts (Highway Gothic) as the designated typeface though the rules are not being implemented properly.

Indonesian road signs use Indonesian, the official and the national language of Indonesia. However, English is also used for important public places such as tourist attractions and airports. Bilingual signs can be found in tourist areas such as Bali.

Indonesia signed the 1968 Vienna Convention on Road Signs and Signals but have yet to ratify the Convention. Indonesia drives on the left.

== Warning signs ==
Warning signs warn of possible dangers or unusual conditions ahead and alert motorists on the hazards to expect. Warning signs in Indonesia used to closely follow US MUTCD and Japanese warnings signs: a diamond-shaped with yellow background and black-and-yellow outline. Though they recently changed it to be a full black outline.

Bend left

Bend right

Double bend left

Double bend right

Sharp bend left

Sharp bend right

Double sharp bend left

Double sharp bend right

Two bend left

Two bend right

Degree loop left

Degree loop right

Surface narrows

Surface widens

Surface narrows on left

Surface narrows on right

Surface widens on left

Surface widens on right

Lane ends on left

Lane ends on right

Added lane on left

Added lane on right

Narrow bridge

Steep descent

Hazardous descent

Steep climb

Hazardous climb

Slippery road

Dangerous shoulder

Cliff

Open water

Dip

Speed bump

Uneven road

Loose gravel

Falling rocks

Falling rocks

Traffic signals

Pedestrian signals

Crossroads

Priority crossroads

Roundabout

Skewed side road to left

Skewed side road to right

Merging traffic

Merging traffic

Side road to left

Side road to right

Priority staggered side roads

Priority staggered side roads

Skewed side road to left

Skewed side road to right

Priority double side roads to left

Priority double side roads to right

Priority side road to left

Priority side road to right

T-junction

Y-junction

Divided road

Divided road ends

Roadway splits

Pedestrian crossing

Pedestrians

Children crossing

Wheelchair crossing

Cyclist crossing

Cattle crossing

Wild animal crossing

Other danger

Road works

Low clearance

Narrow clearance

Railway crossing (with barriers)

Railway crossing (No barriers)

Low flying aircraft

Crosswinds

Two-way traffic

Drawbridge

Worded warning sign (in this case "Accident")

Countdown marker

Countdown marker

Countdown marker

Hazard marker

Hazard marker

Hazard marker

Chevron marker

Chevron marker

== Prohibitory signs ==
Prohibitory signs in Indonesia are circular in shape and have a red border with diagonal bars except for Stop, Give Way, and Railroad Crossing signs.

Stop

Give way

Toll gates

Give way to oncoming traffic

One-track railroad crossing

Multi-track railroad crossing

No vehicles

No entry

No motorcycles and mopeds

No overtaking

No three-wheelers

No cars

No trucks

No buses

No tractors

No trailers

No trailers

No cars and motorcycles

No cars and trucks

No trucks and busses

No motorcycles, cars, and trucks

No cars, trucks, and buses

No pedestrians

No push-carts

No bicycles

No cycle rickshaw

No carts

No horse-drawn carriages

Maximum length for motorized vehicles

Maximum height limit

Maximum width limit

Maximum length limit for non-motorised vehicles

Maximum weight limit

Maximum weight limit per axel

Maximum weight limit per axel for dual-wheel vehicles

Maximum weight limit per axel for vehicles with a single rear axle

Maximum weight limit per axel for vehicles with multiple rear axles

No entry for vehicles with width exceeding 2.5m, length exceeding 18m, height exceeding 4.2m and heaviest axel load exceeding 10 tons

No entry for vehicles with width exceeding 2.5m, length exceeding 12m, height exceeding 4.2m and heaviest axel load exceeding 8 tons

No entry for vehicles with width exceeding 2.1m, length exceeding 9m, height exceeding 3.5m and heaviest axel load exceeding 8 tons

No stopping

No parking

No left turn

No right turn

No U-turn

No right turn or U-turn

Minimum distance between cars

Maximum speed limit in kilometers per hour (km/h)

No honking

Prohibition sign with a worded message

End of speed restriction

End of overtaking restriction

End of honking restriction

End of all restrictions

== Mandatory signs ==
Mandatory signs in Indonesia follows the "Type A Mandatory Signs" as prescribed by the Vienna Convention, which is the European-style white-on-blue circular signs with addition of a white border.

Keep left

Keep right

Turn left

Turn right

Go straight/one way

Roundabout

Straight ahead or left turn primited

Straight ahead or right turn primited

Keep left

Keep right

Pass either side

Minimum speed limit in kilometres per hour (km/h)

Tire chain

Motorcycles lane

Bus-only lane

Truck-only lane

Pedestrians only

Equestrians only

Bicycles only

Rickshaws only

Carts only

Horse carriage only

Non-motorized vehicles only

End of minimum speed limit

End of tire chain usage

== Directional signs ==
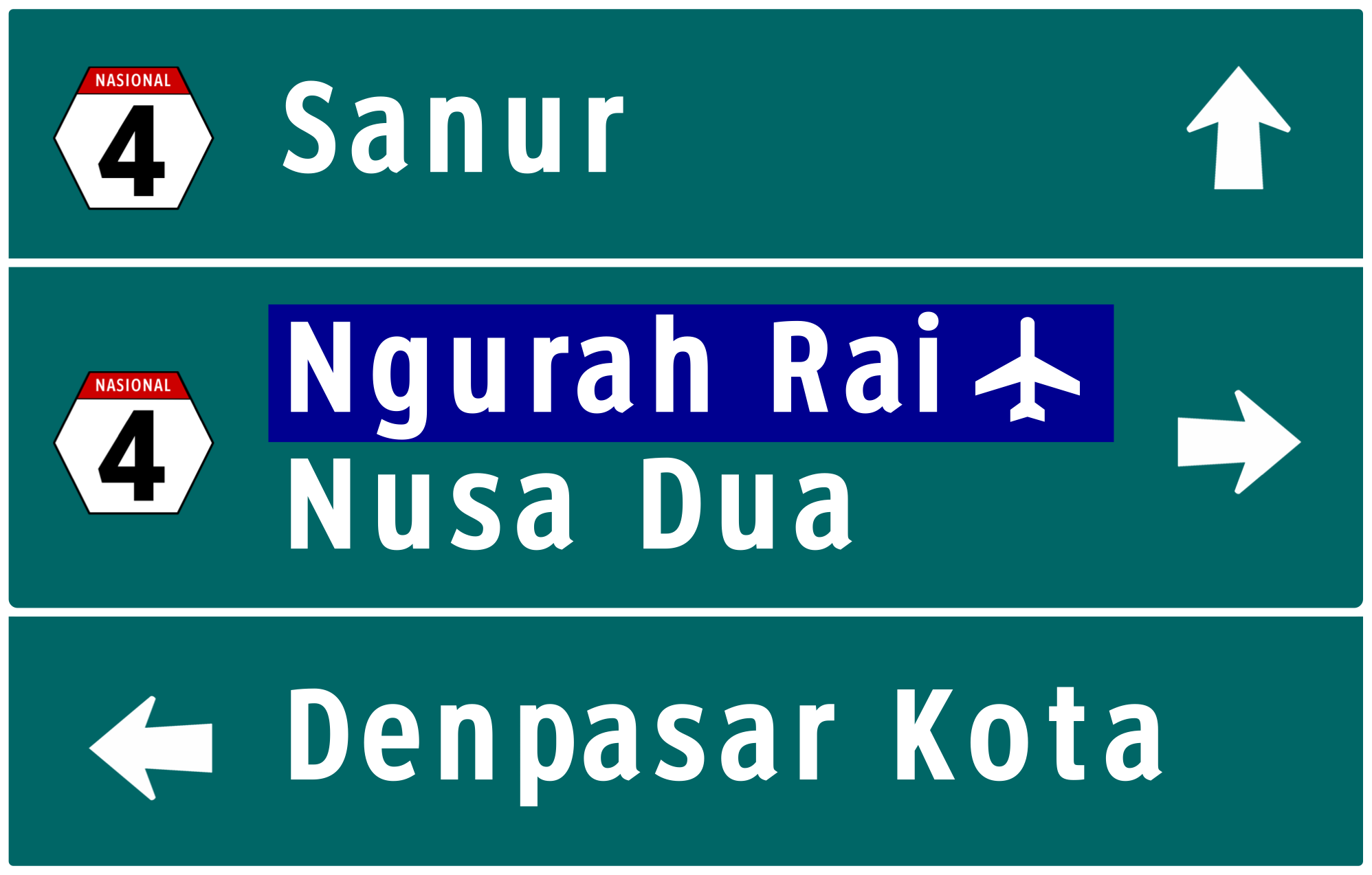
4-way directional sign. Ngurah Rai International Airport is highlighted in blue as it is a public facility

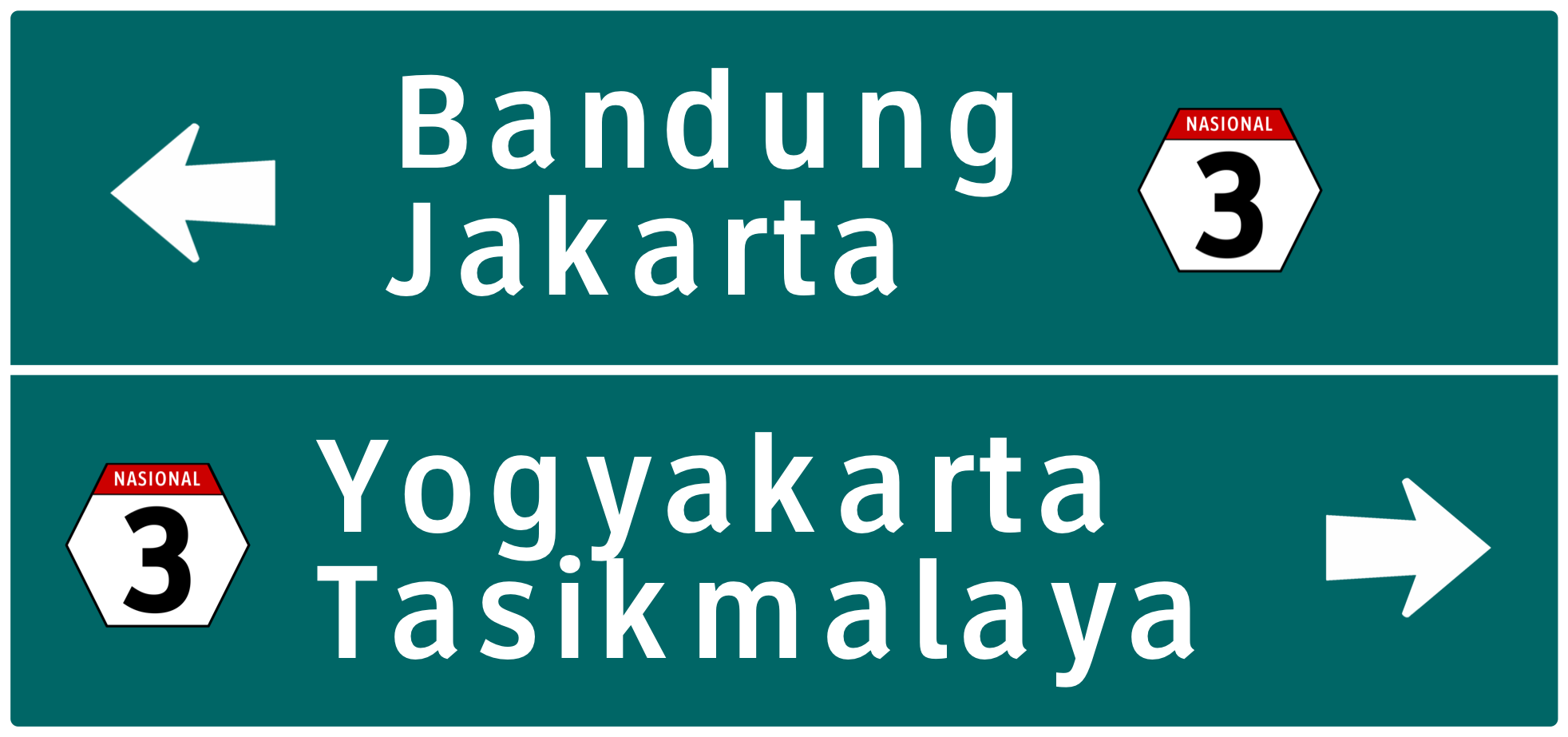
3-way directional sign. Note the Indonesian National Highway number hexagon

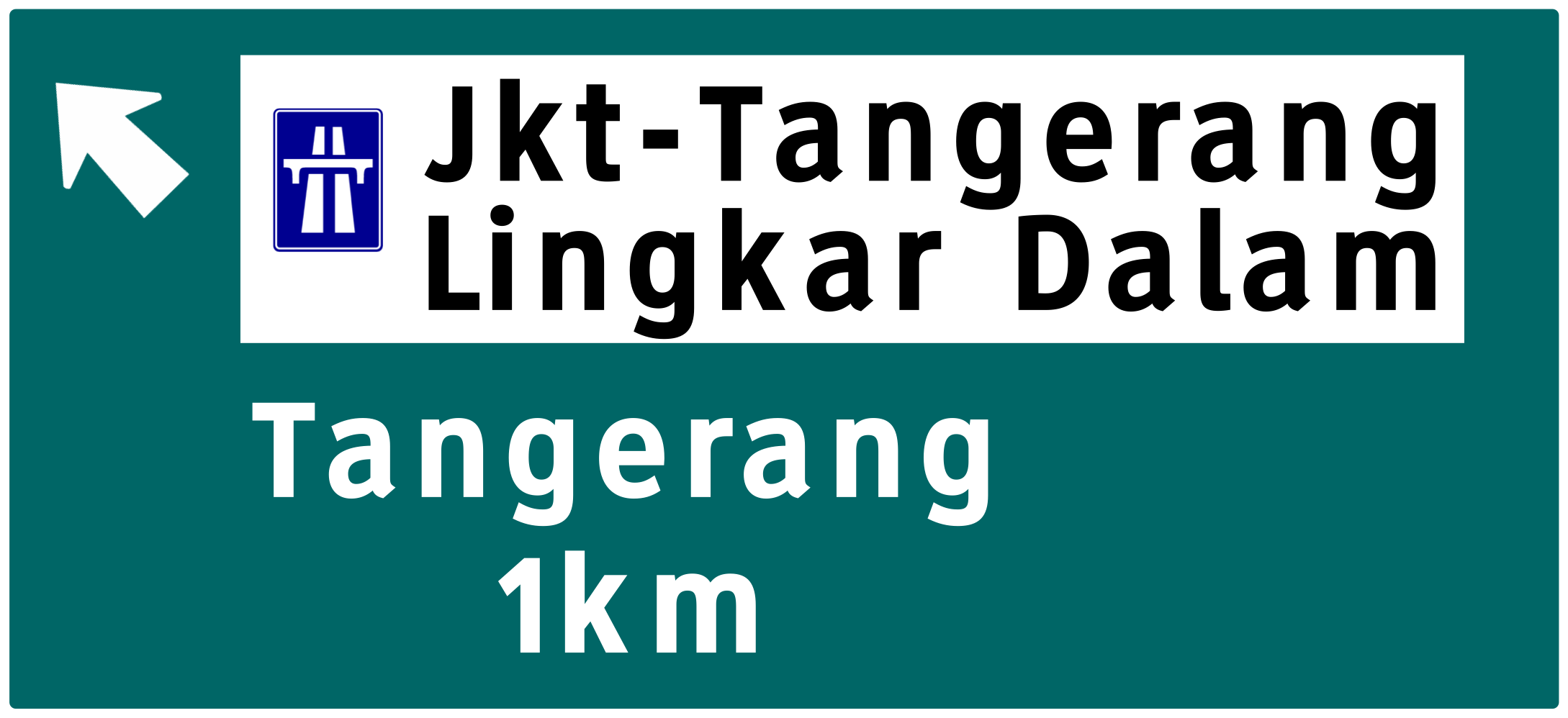
Exit to toll road

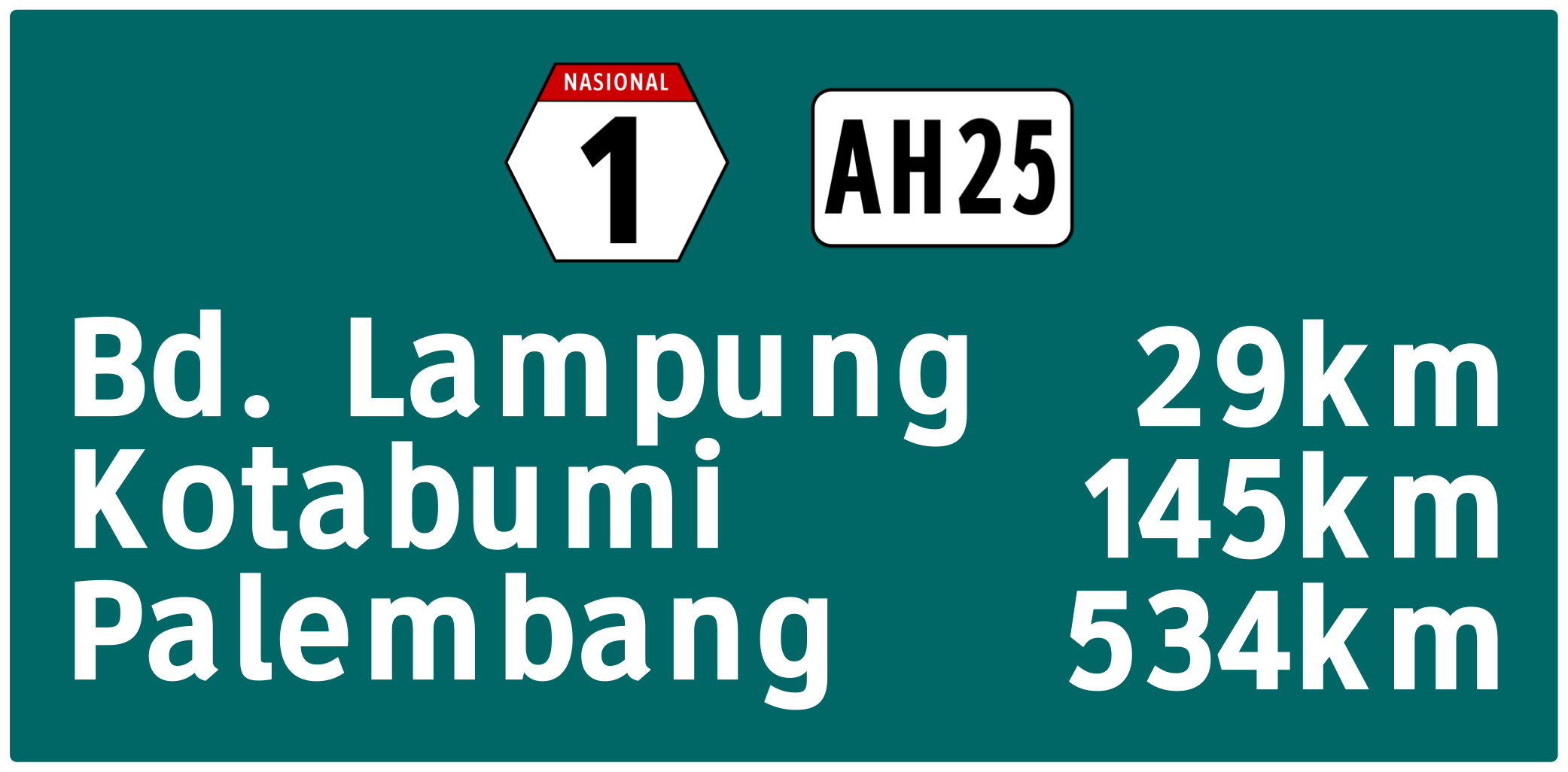
National route distance sign (differs by island)

Entrance to toll road

3-way directional sign. Kawasan Kota Tua, a tourist attraction, is highlighted in brown

4-way intersection directional sign. TOL PURBALEUNYI, a motorway, is highlighted in white and bears the international highway symbol, while Stasiun KA Kota, a train station, is highlighted in blue.

== Toll Road signs ==
Most of the signs in this section are custom-made by the toll road operator and unavailable in the current regulations.

Toll Road begins

Toll Road ends

Toll road name begins

Toll road name ends

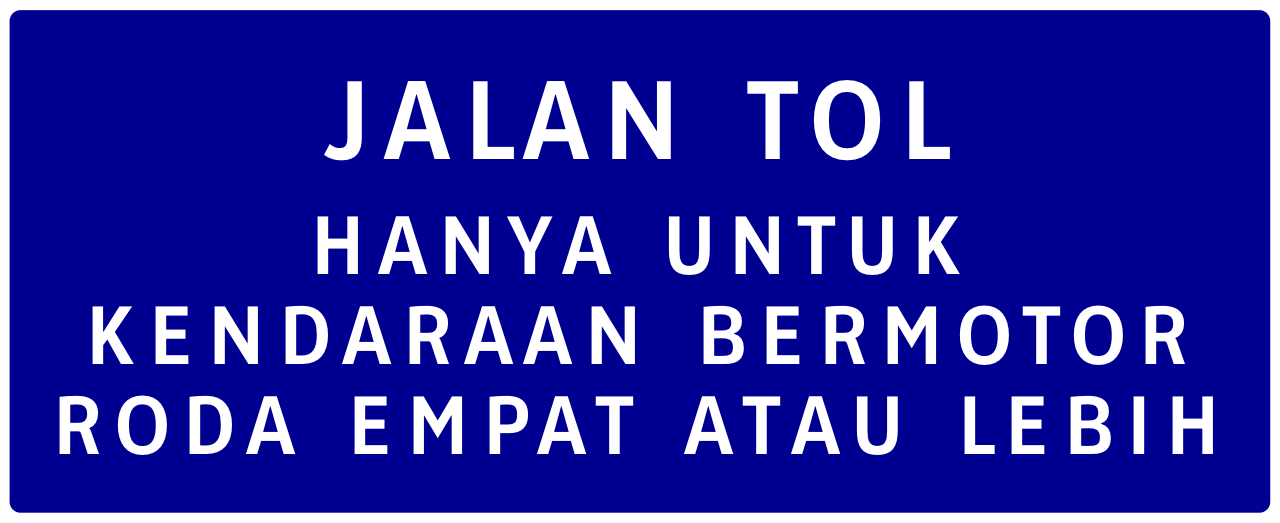
Highway restrictions for non-motorised vehicles ("Toll road is only for motorised vehicles with four or more wheels")

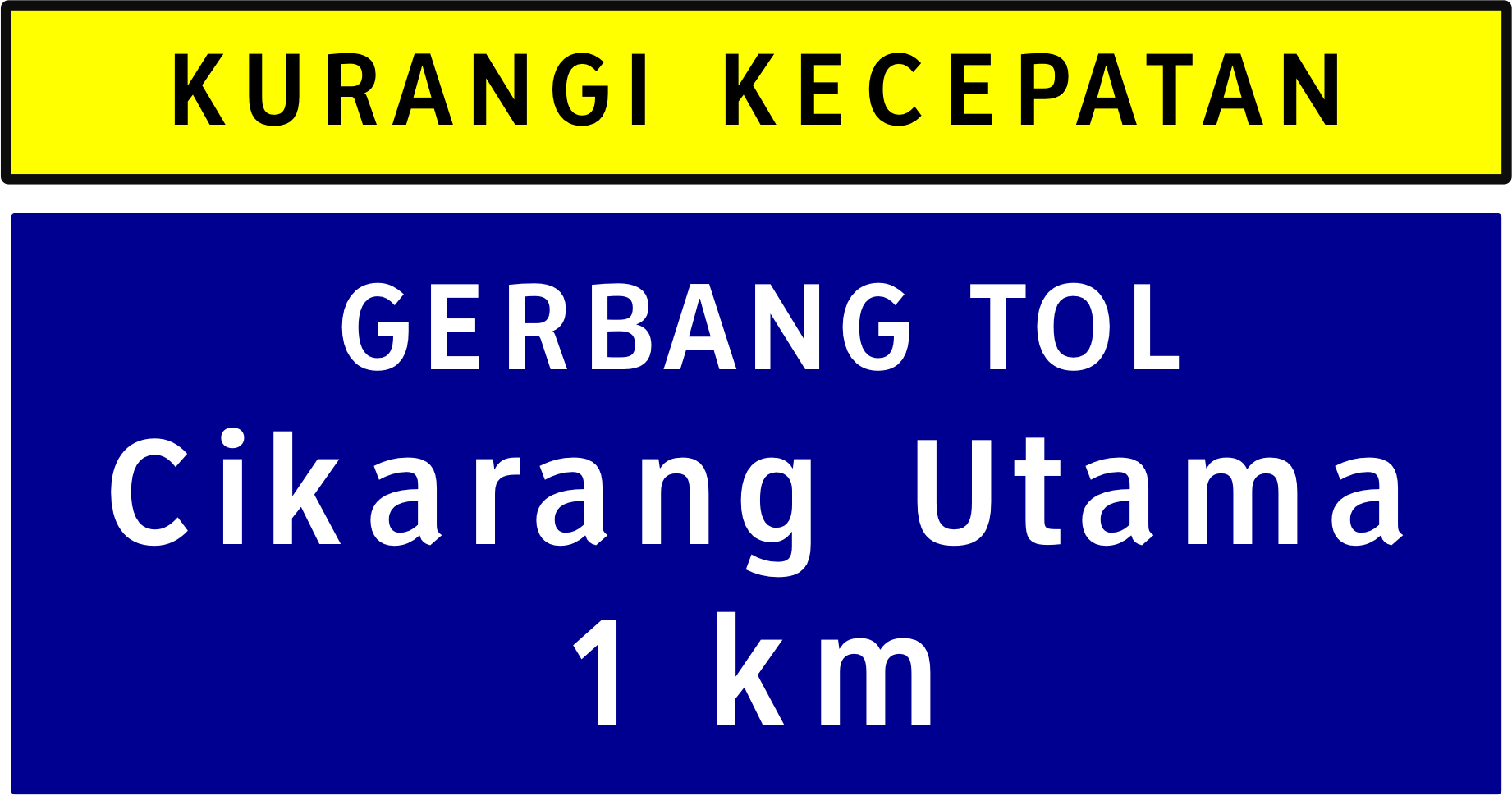
Toll gates ahead

Exit ahead (1 km)

Exit ahead (500 m)

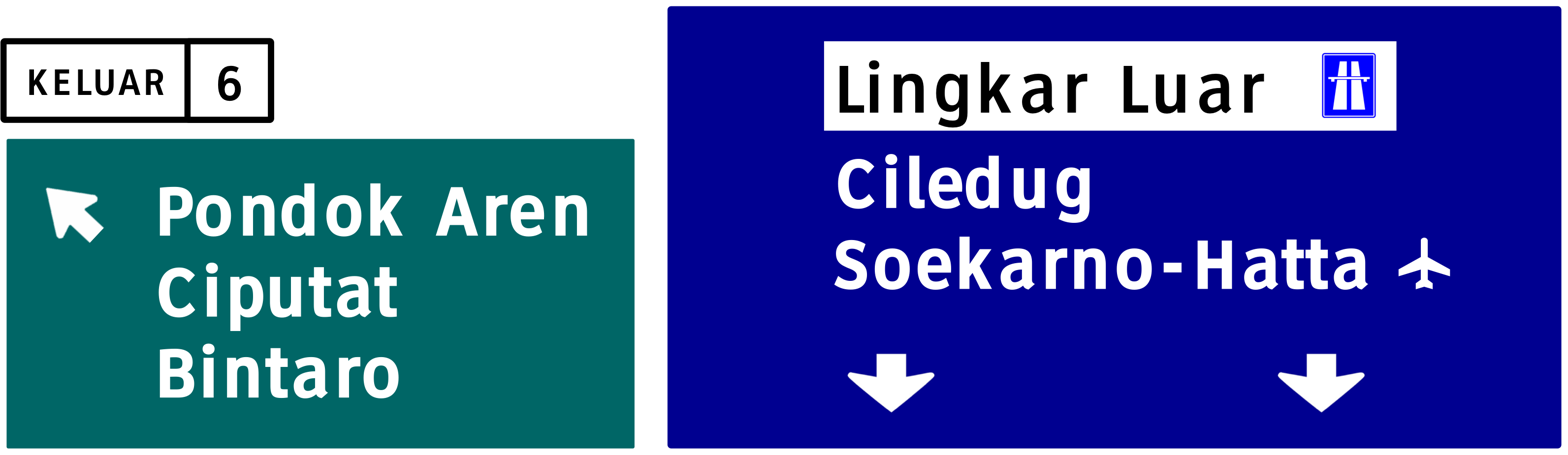
Exit ahead (300 m)

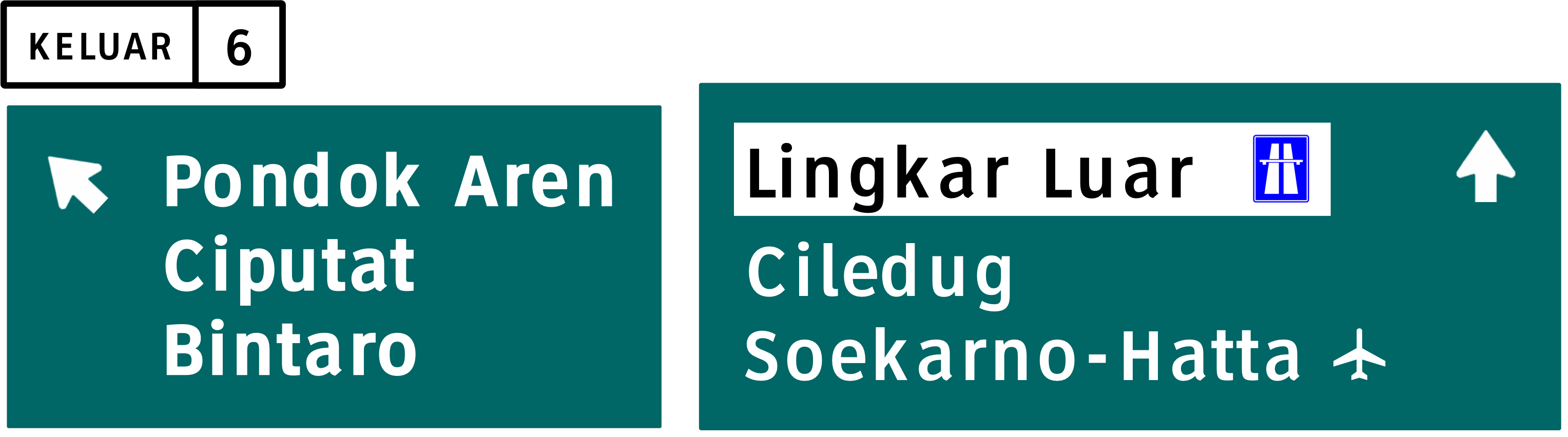
Exit sign (butterfly gantry sign placed in between ramp)

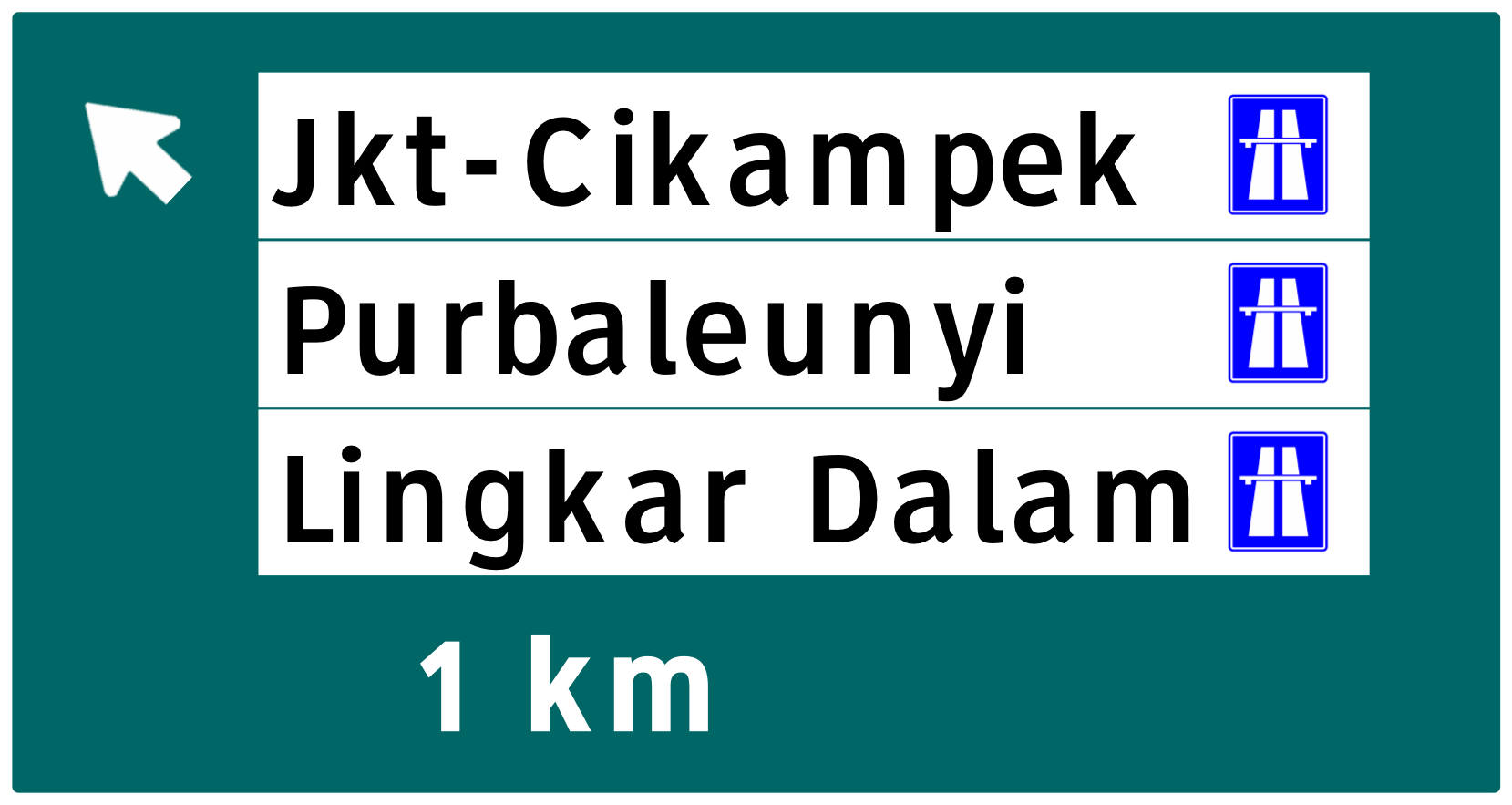
Interchange ahead (1 km)

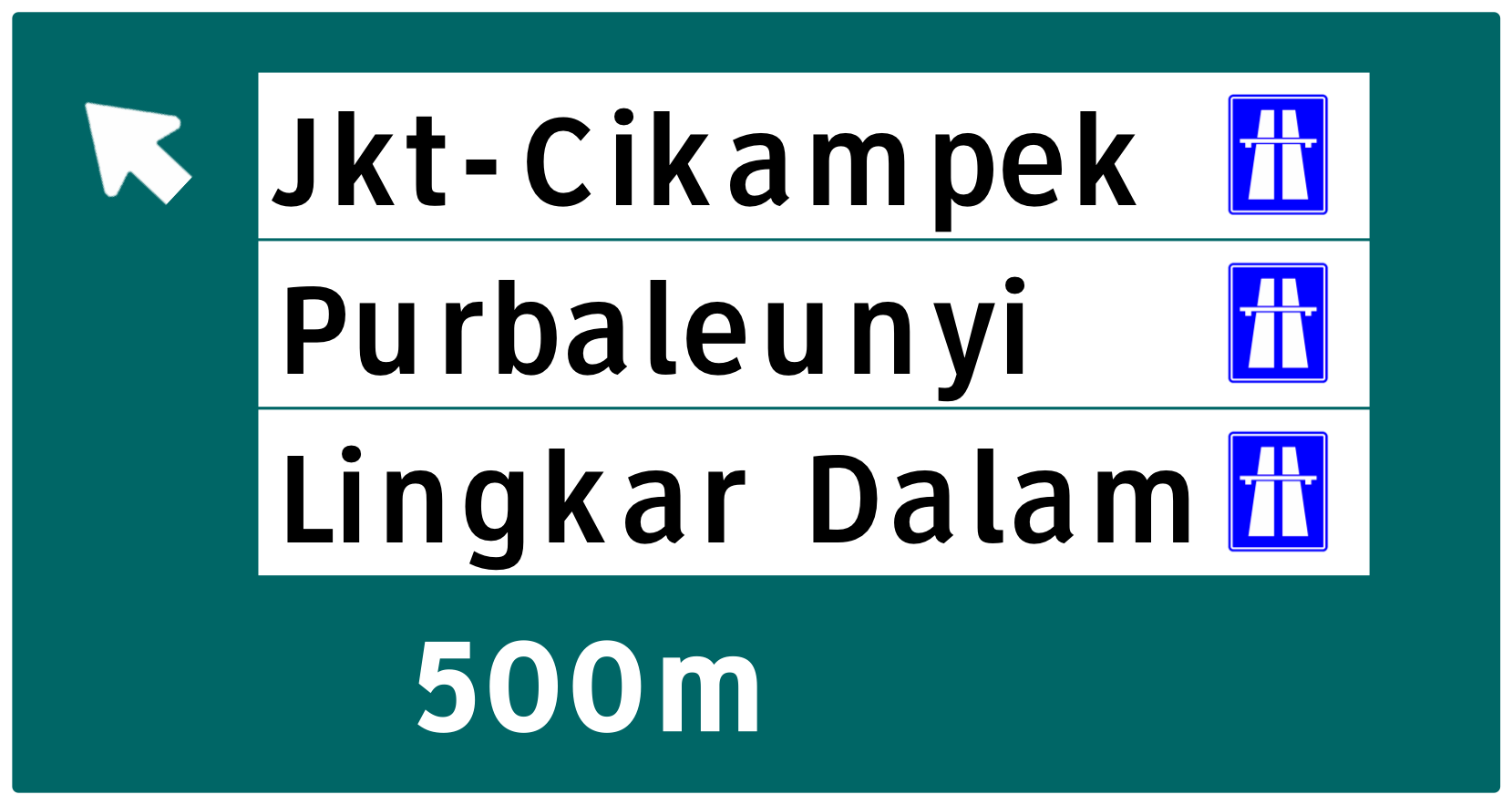
Interchange ahead (500m)

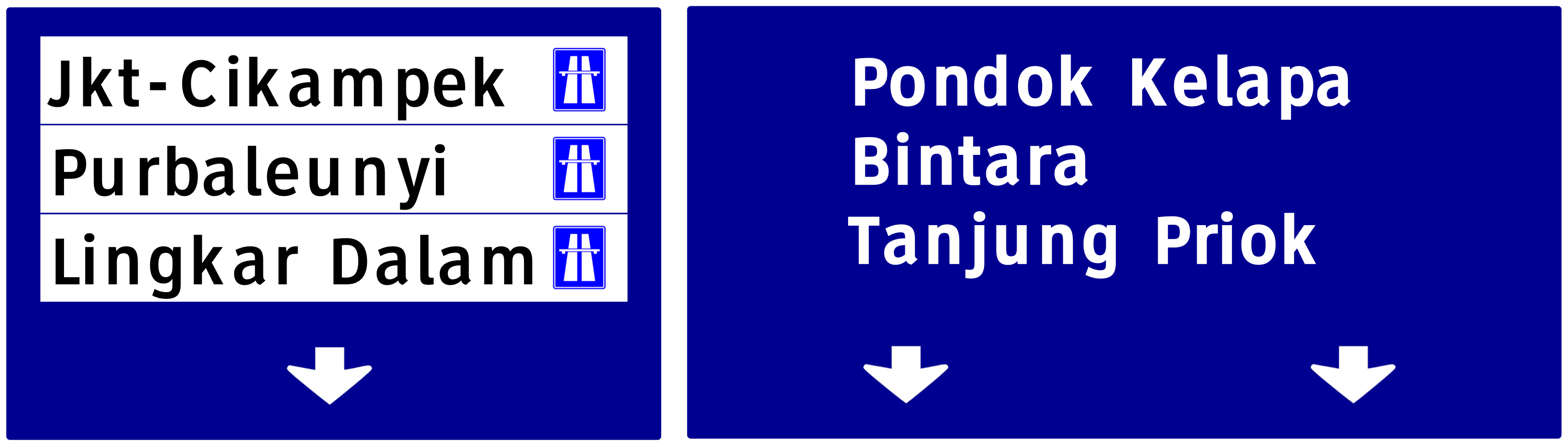
Interchange ahead (300m)

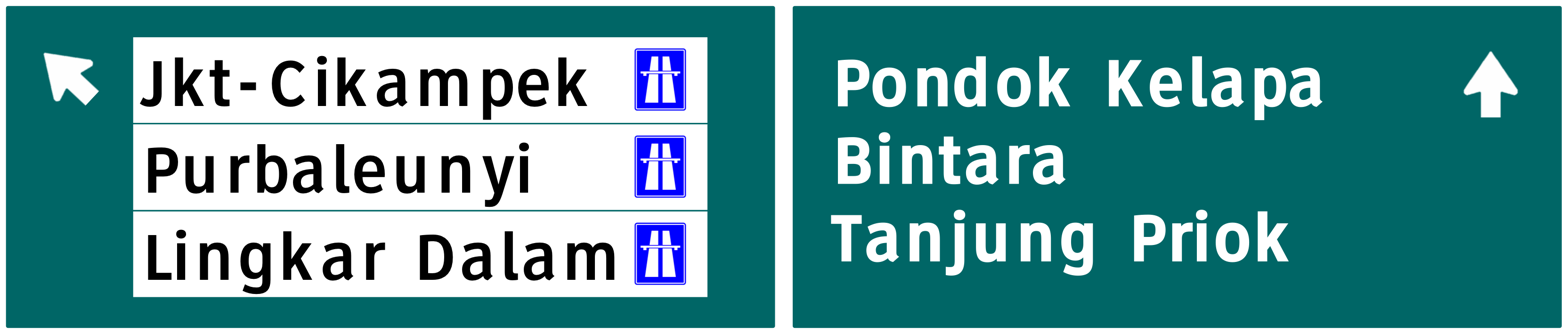
Interchange exit

Highway distance sign

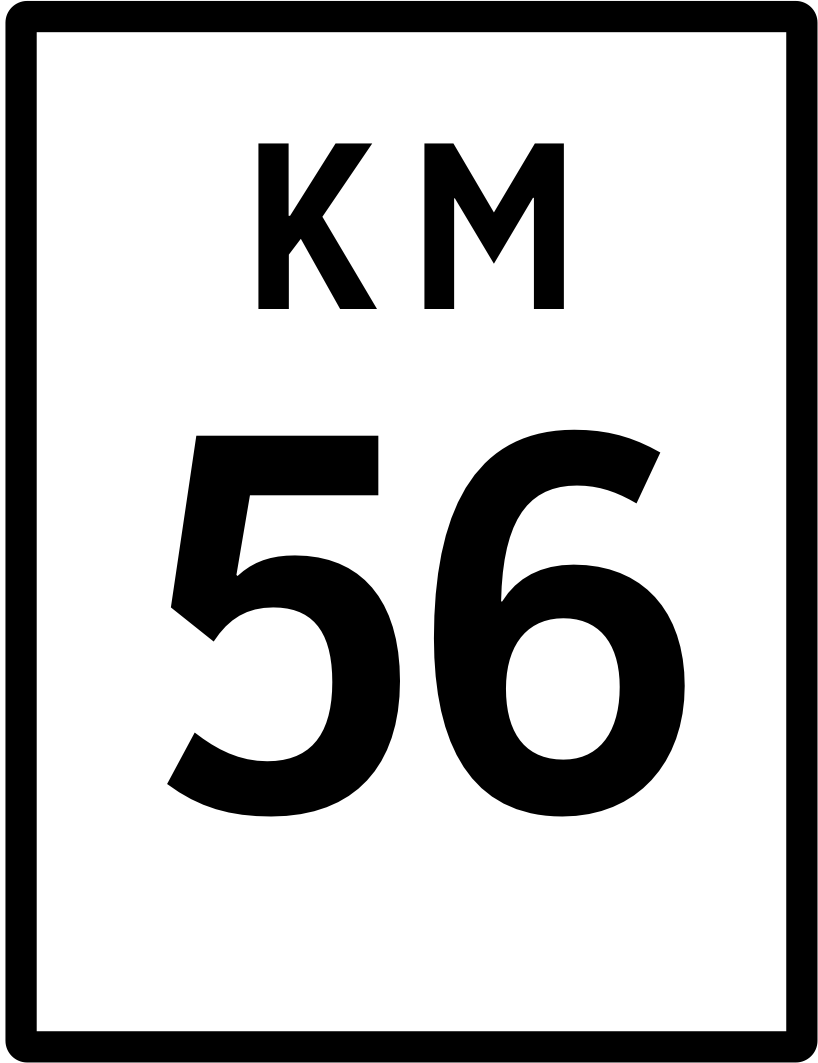
Highway location marker

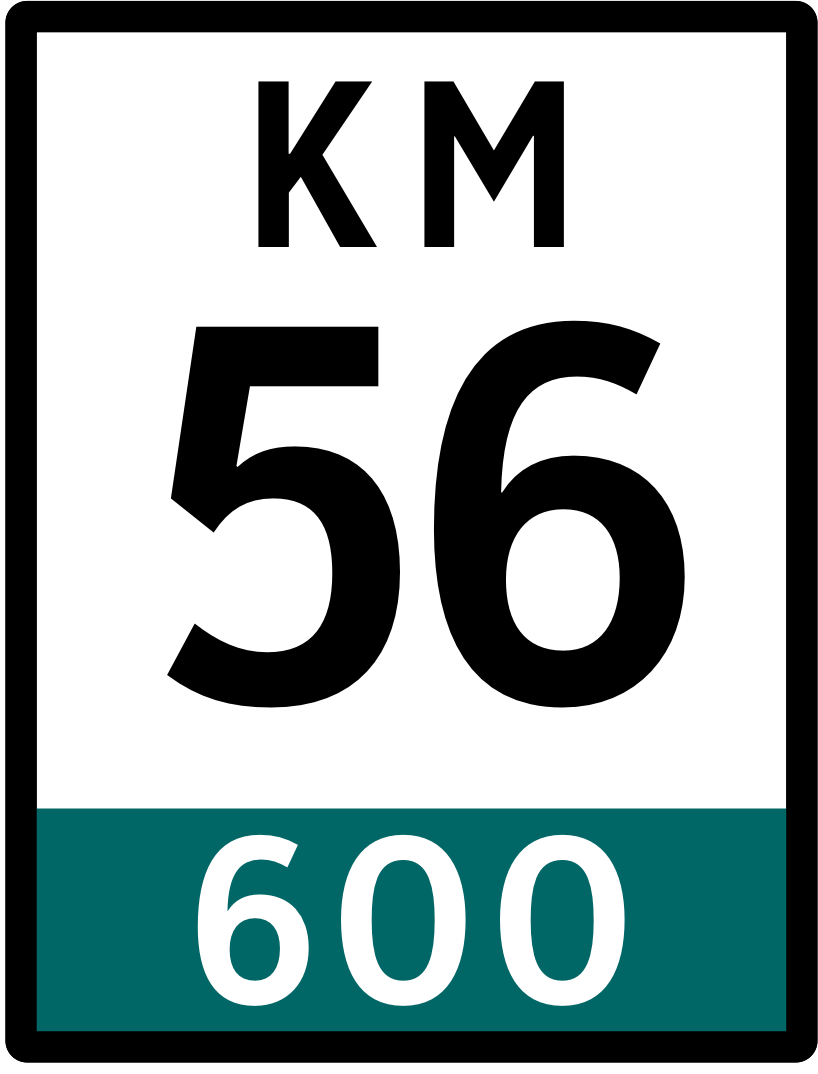
Highway location marker with meters, placed in each 200 m of the Motorway

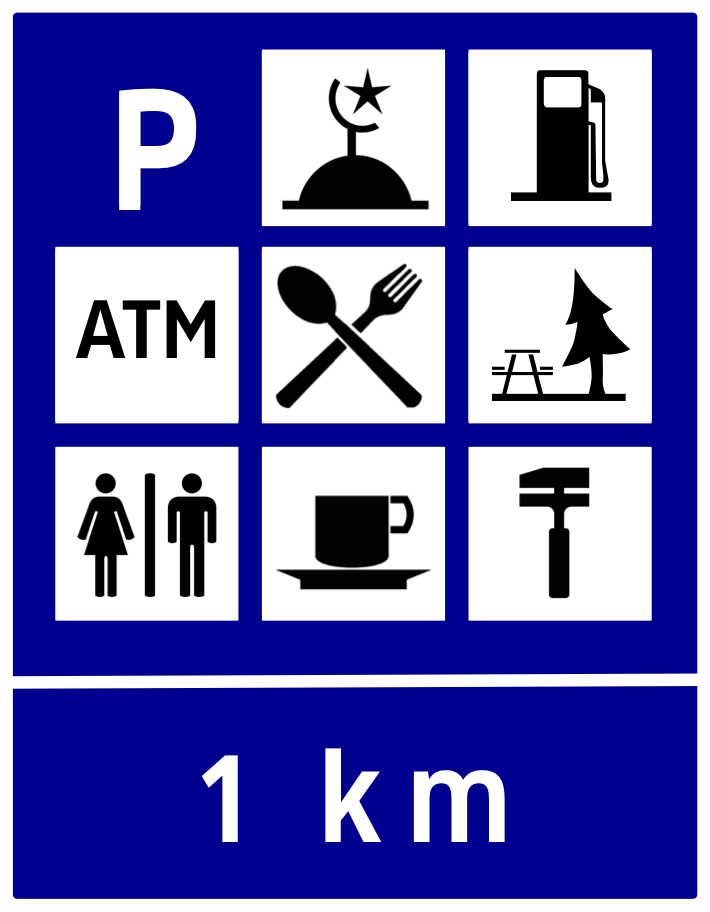
Rest area ahead (1 km)

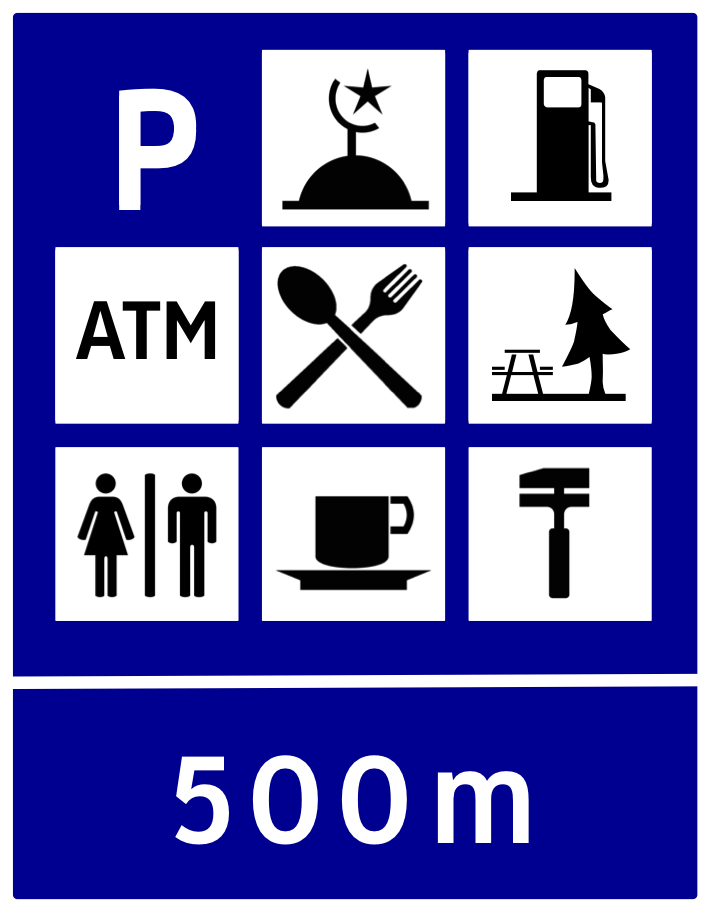
Rest area ahead (500 m)

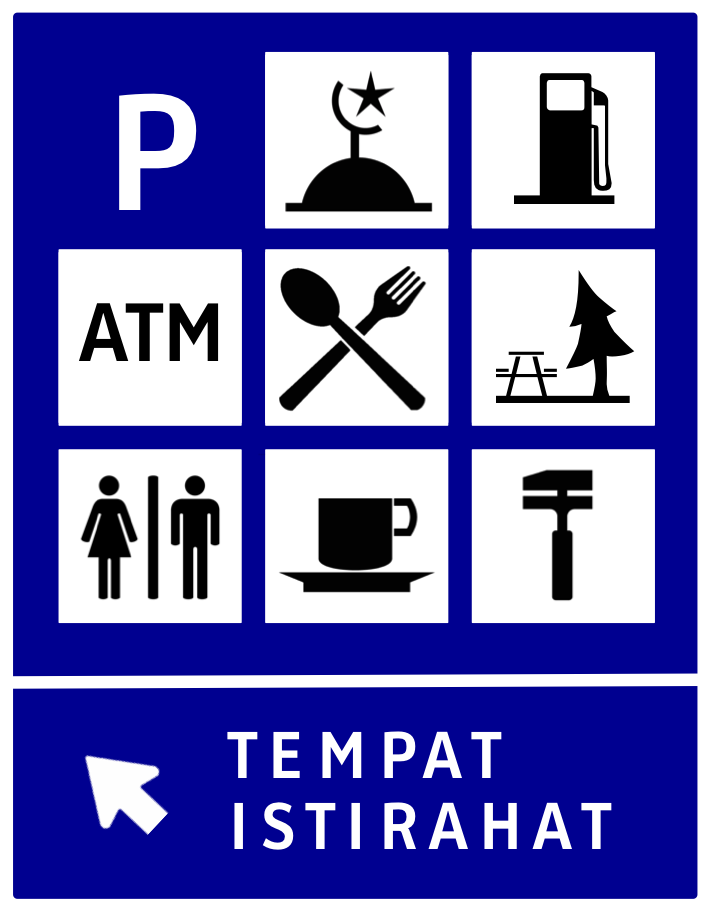
Rest area ahead (~300 m)

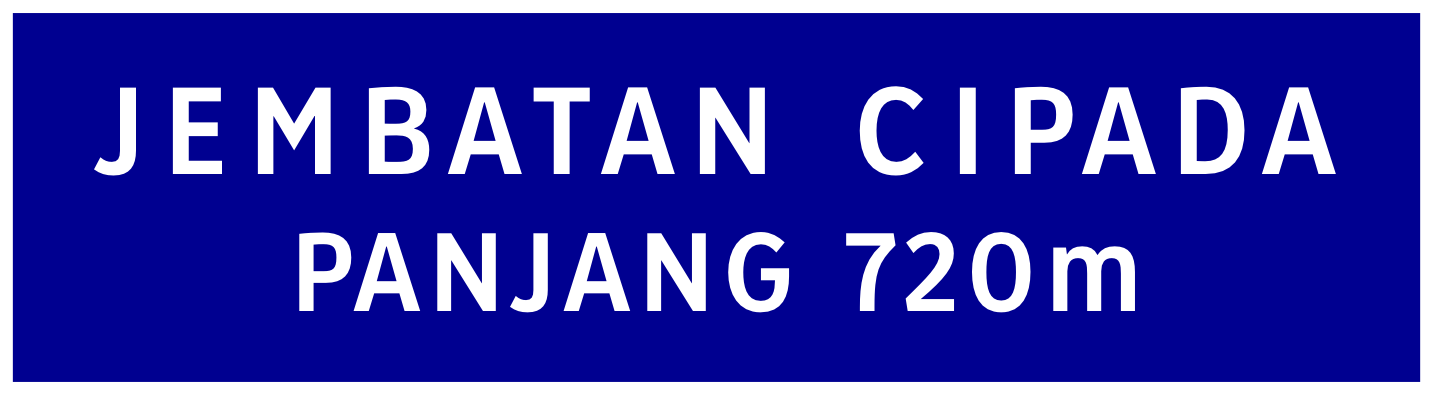
Bridge name

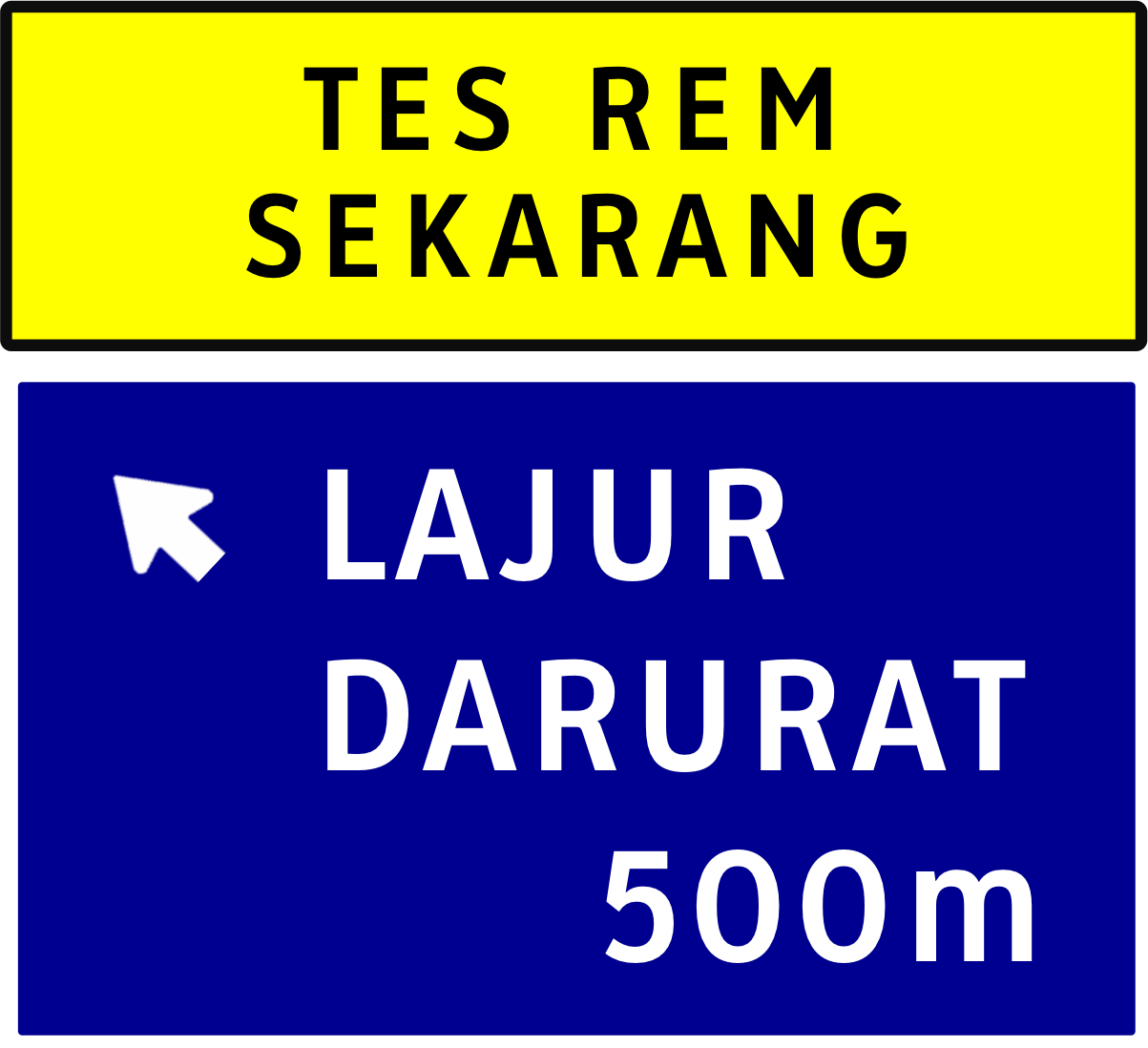
Runaway ramp. The 500m distance is omitted in 300m before the ramp

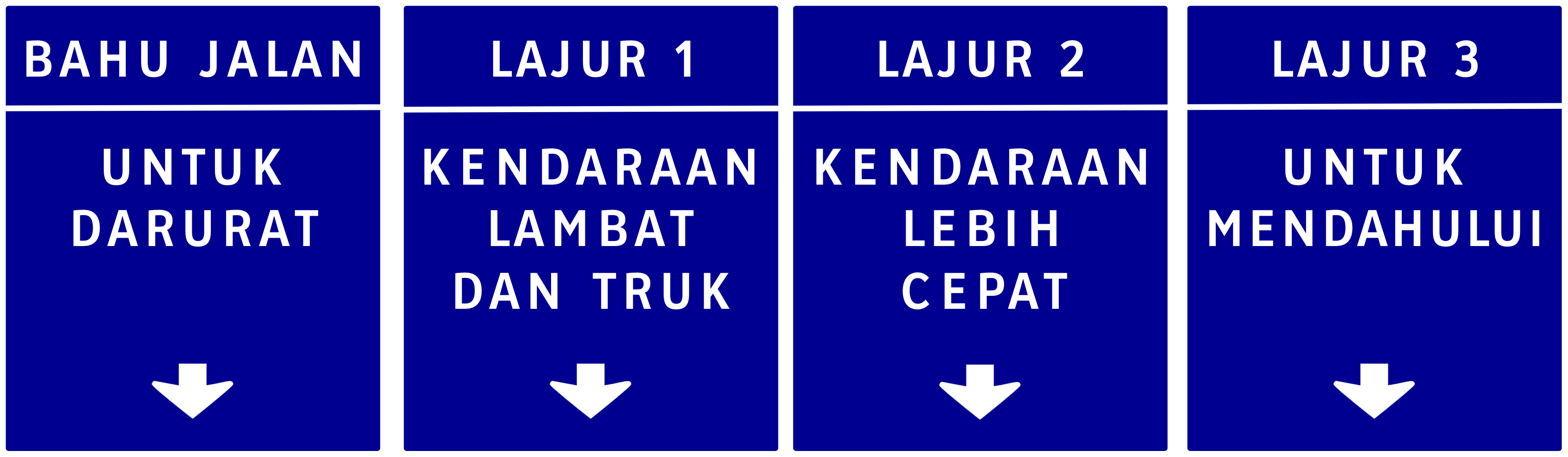
Lane directory

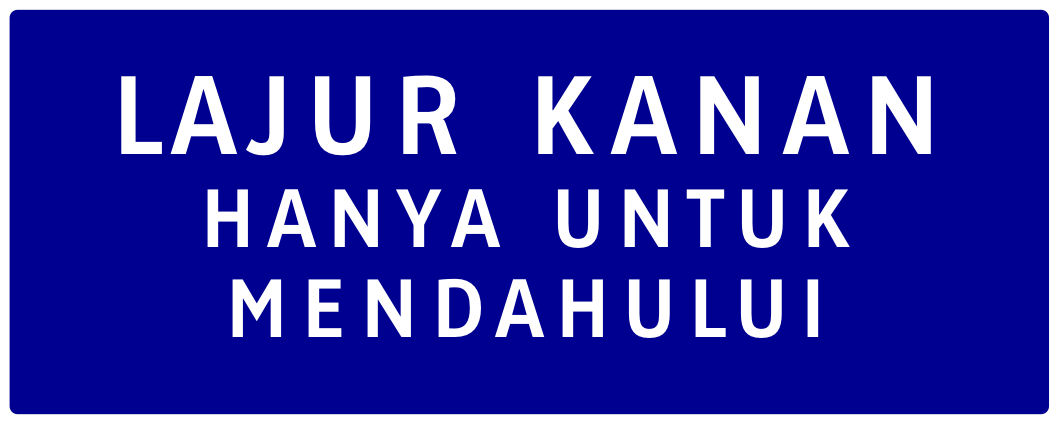
Advisory sign (Right lane for overtaking only)

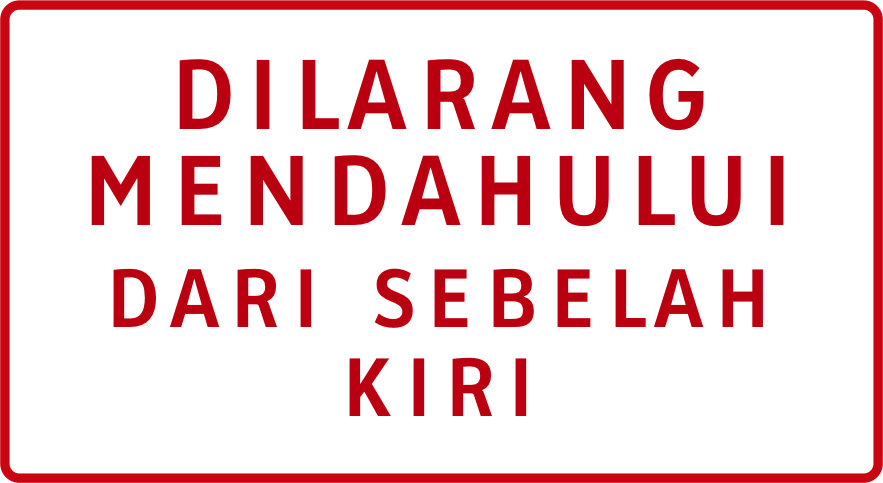
Prohibition sign (Overtaking from left is prohibited)

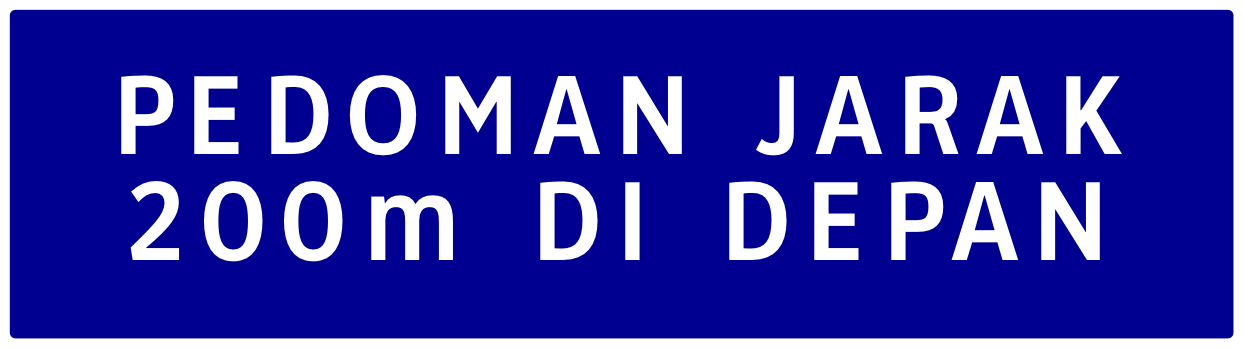
Distance guidance ahead

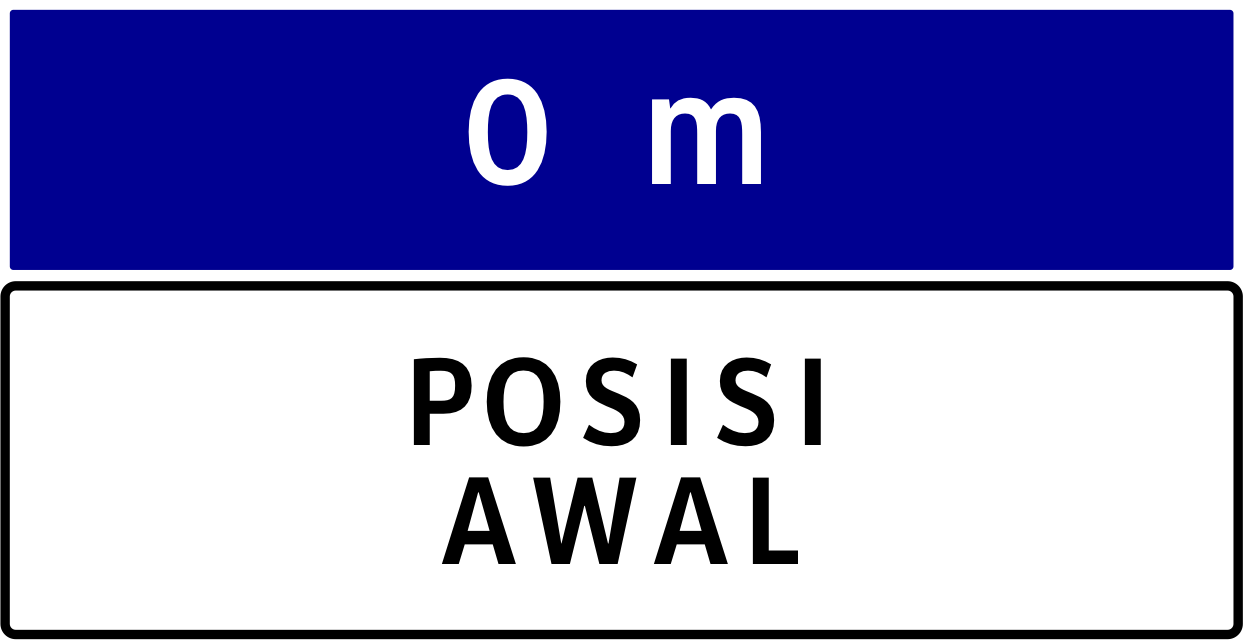
Distance guidance (0m-initial position)

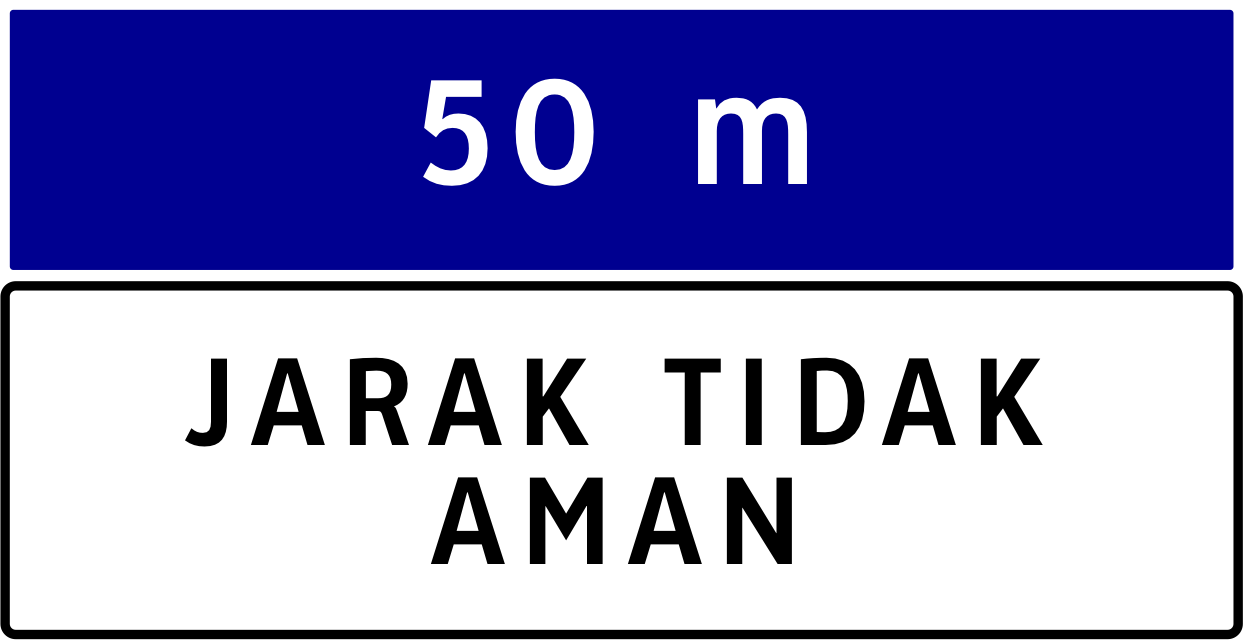
Distance guidance (50m-unsafe distance)

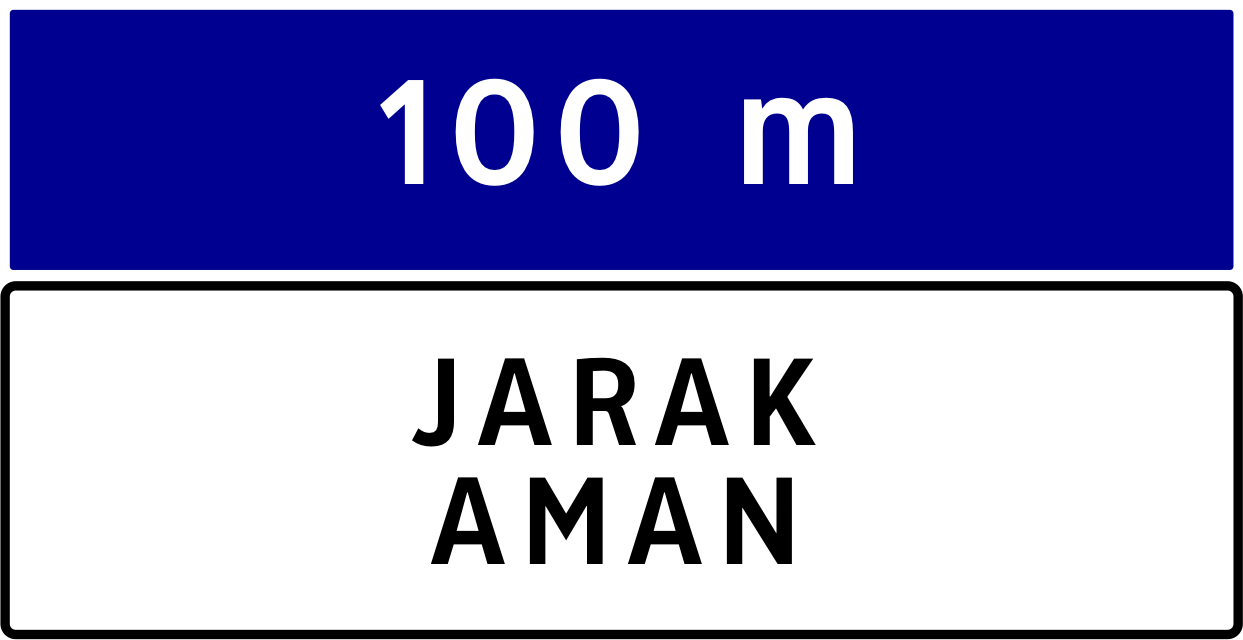
Distance guidance (100m-safe distance)

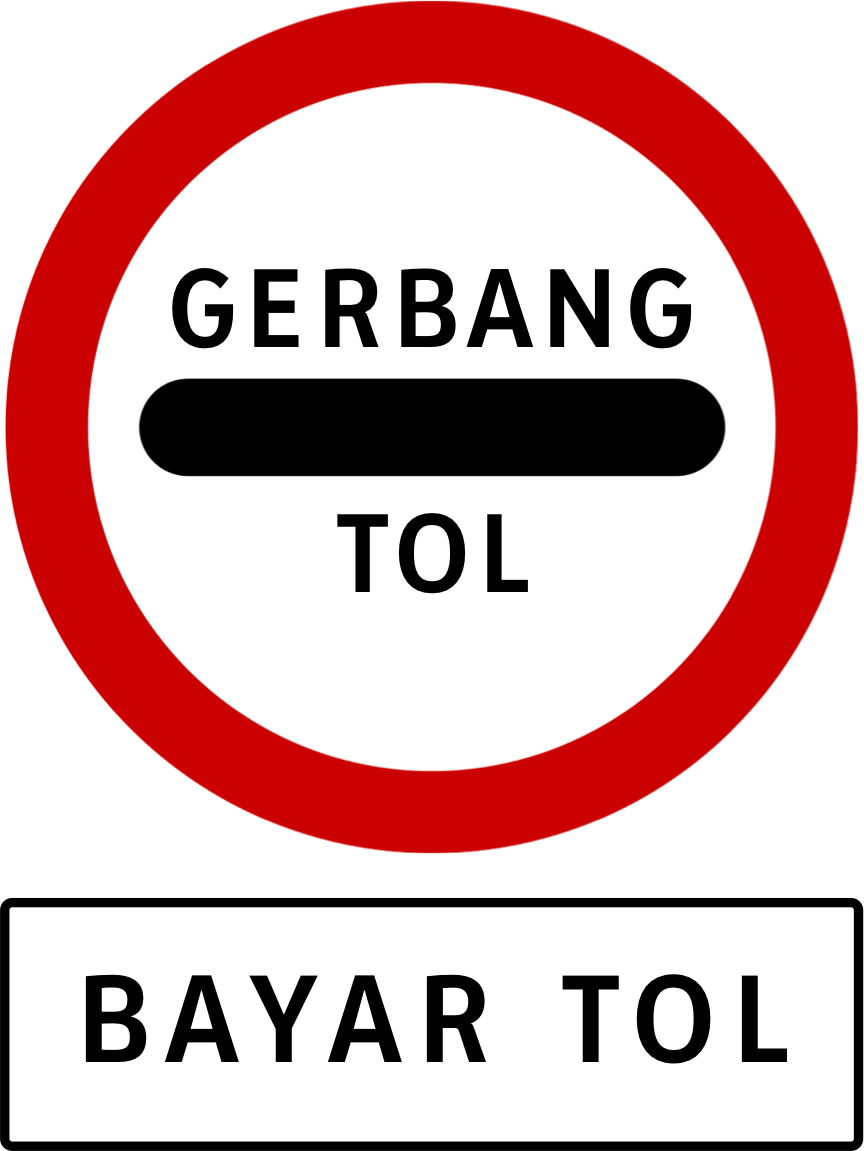
Toll gates (pay toll before using the non-cash method since October 31, 2017 this sign is no longer there)

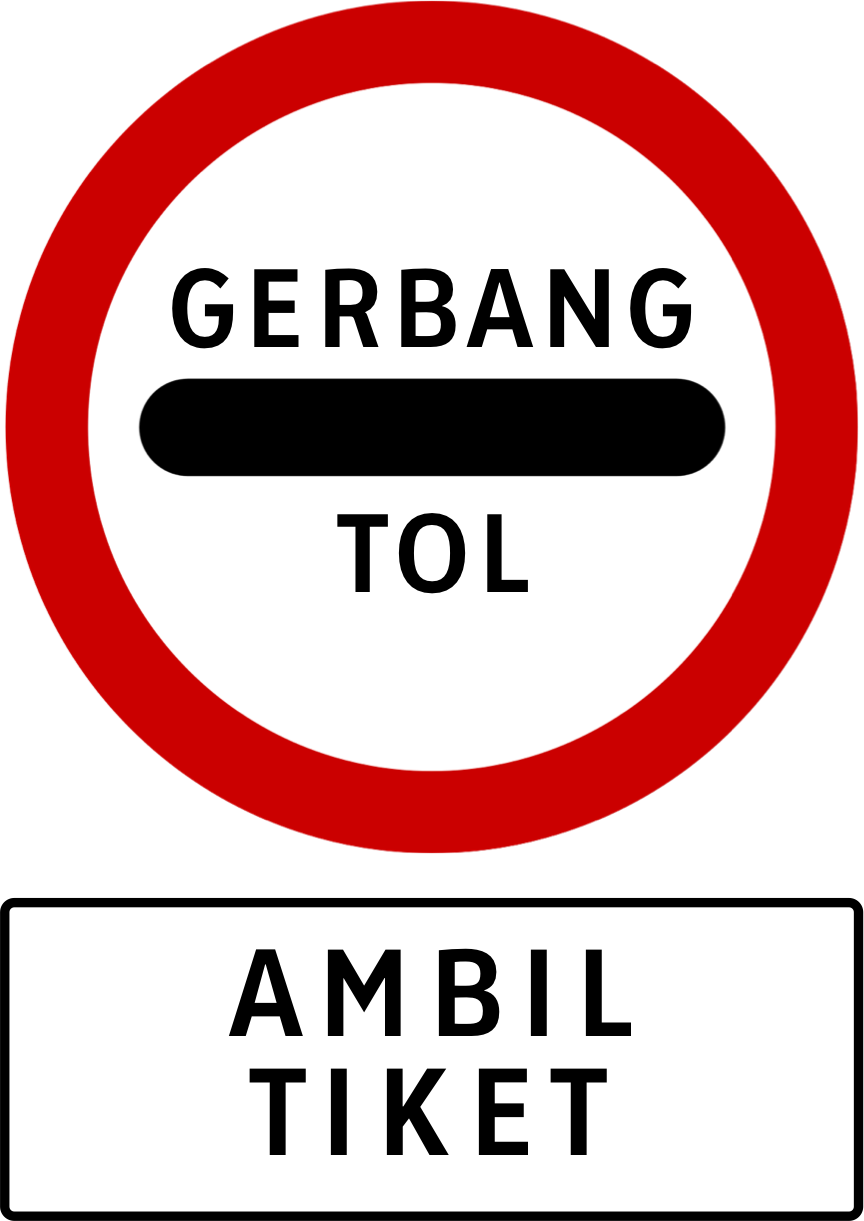
Toll gates (take ticket)

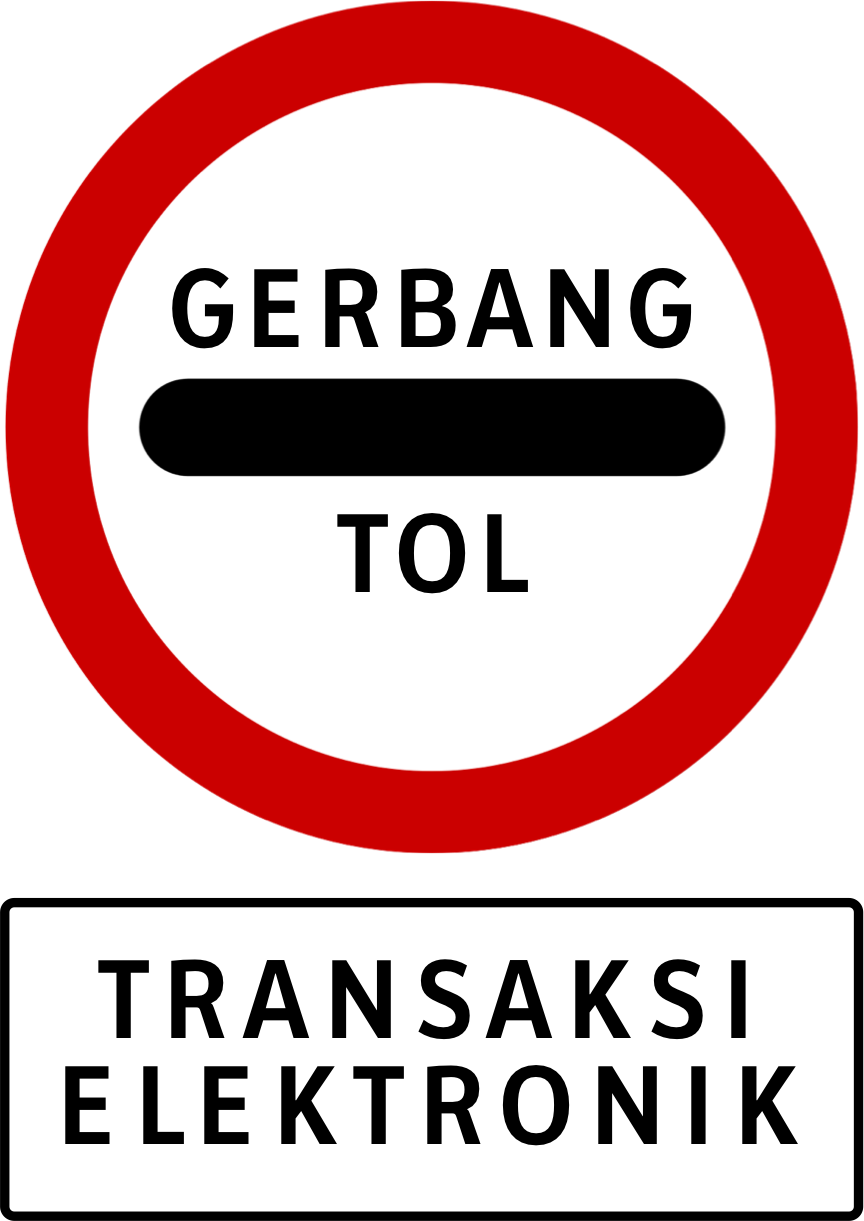
Toll gates (electronic payment has started using non-cash since 2017 by attaching a card)

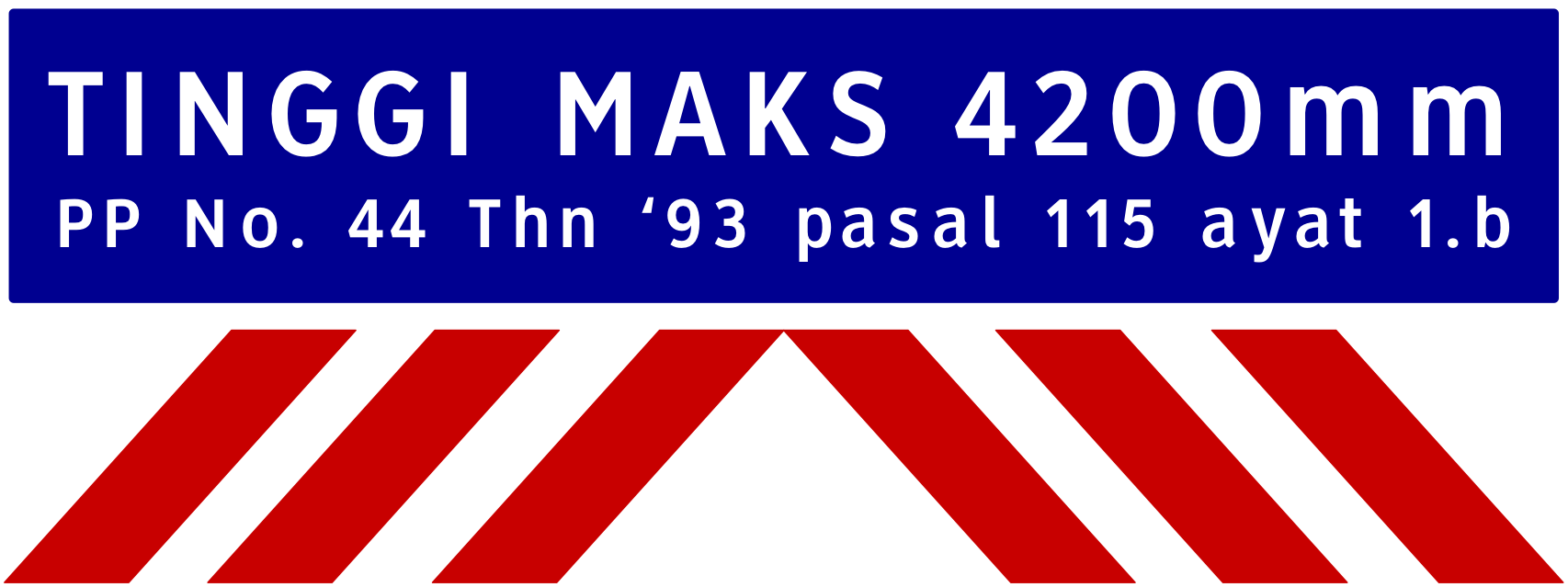
Toll gates height limit (might be omitted in some toll gates)

Warning sign (Fog)

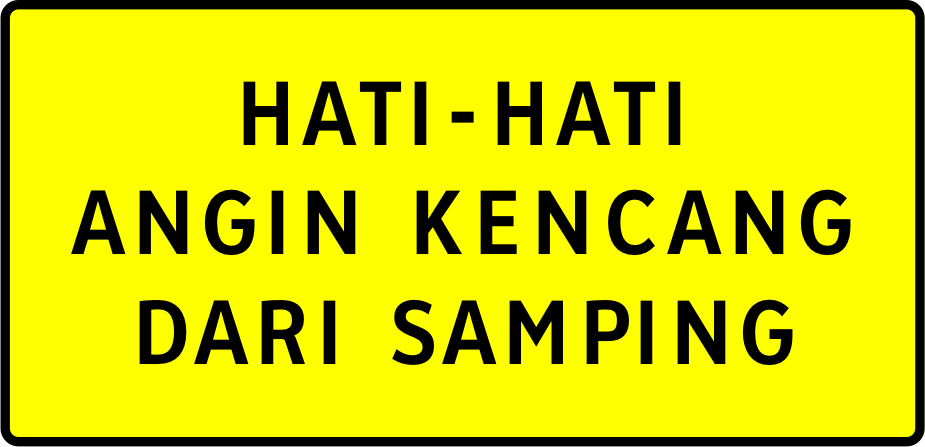
Warning sign (Crosswind)

== Information signs ==
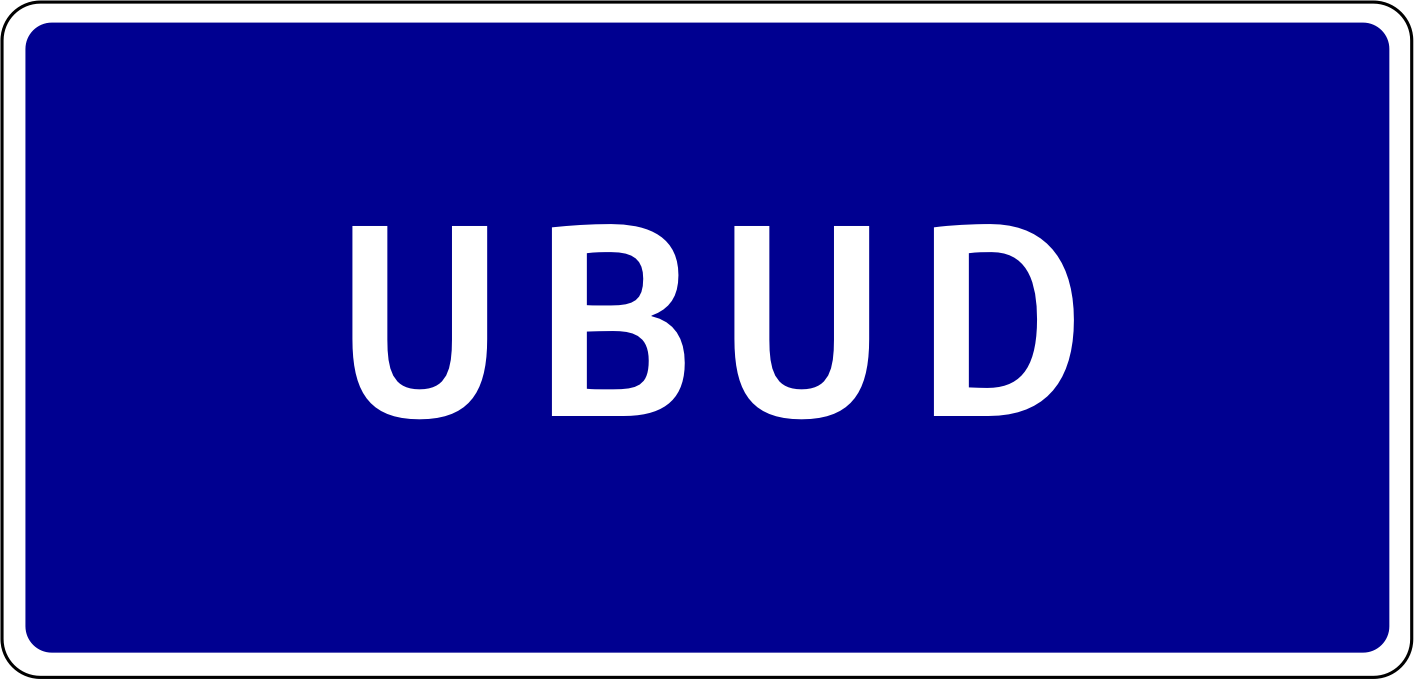
City limits

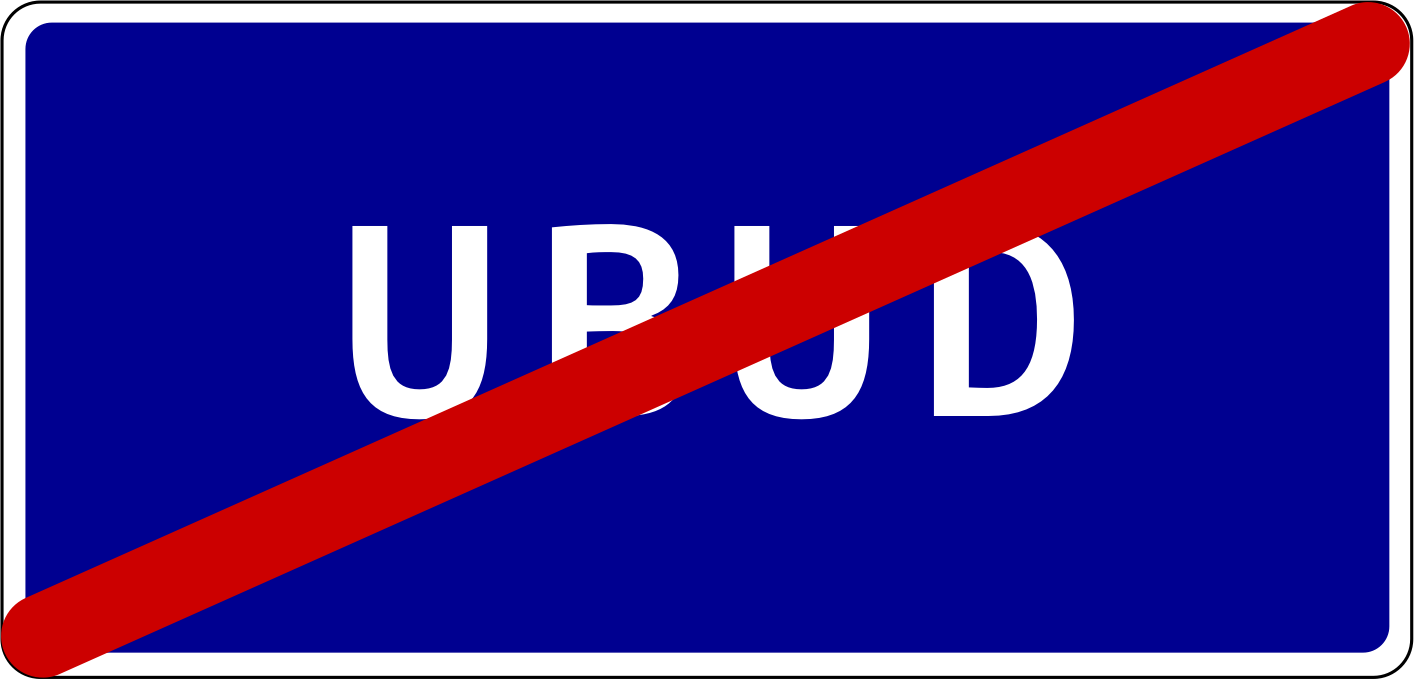
End of city limits

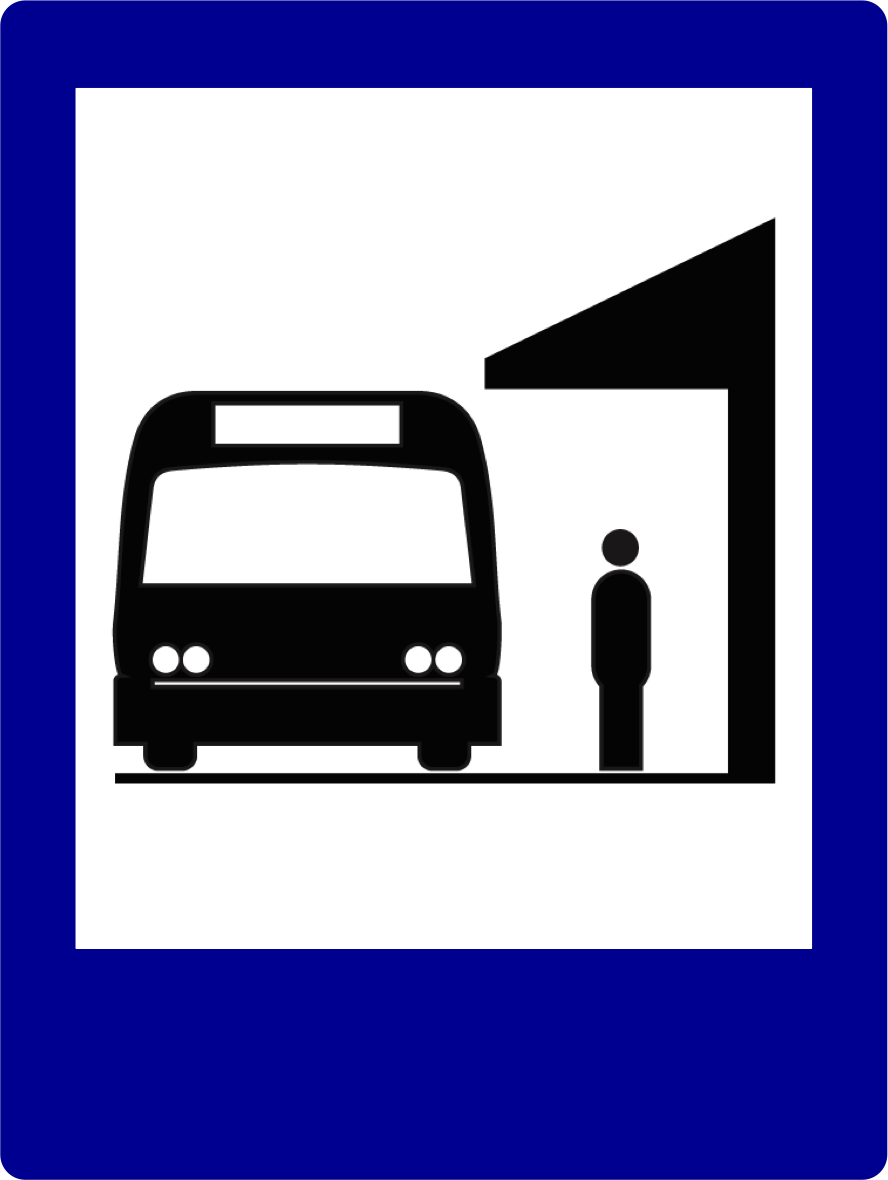
Bus terminal

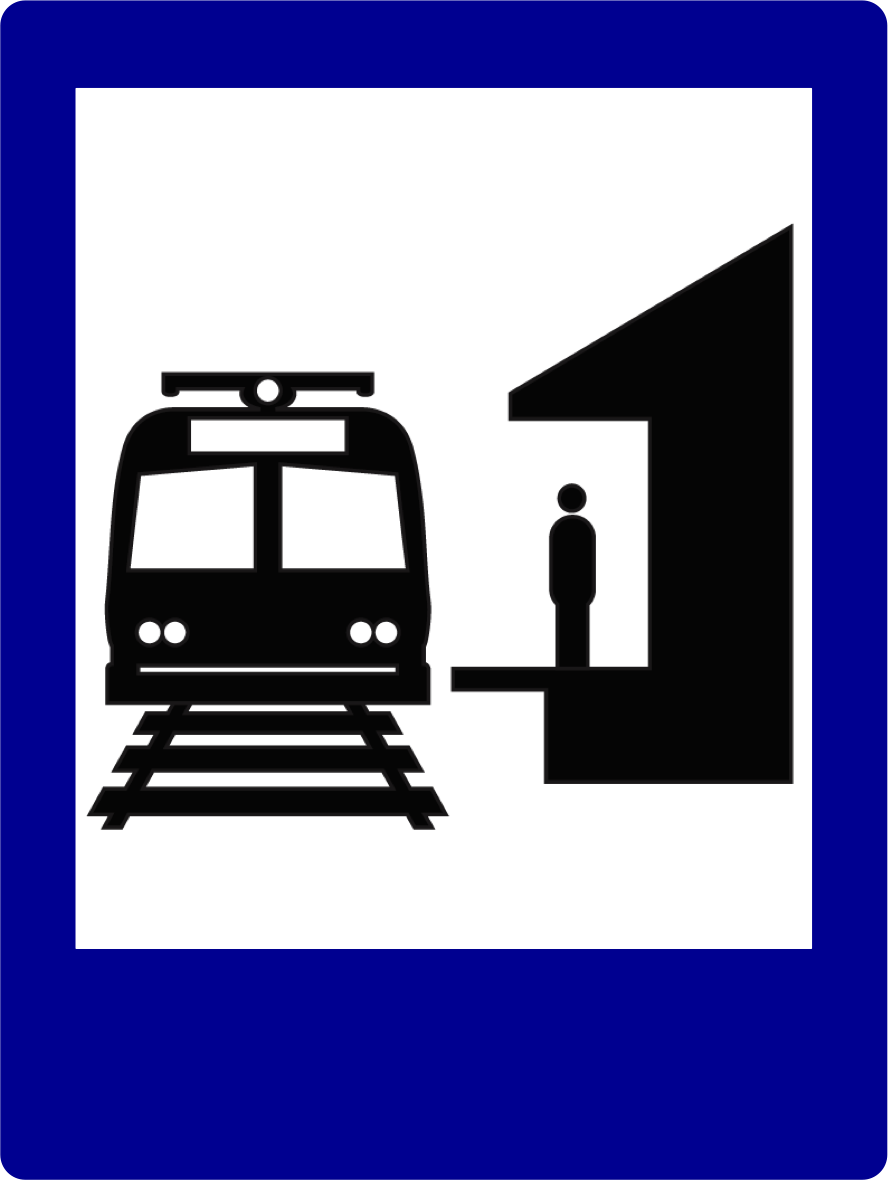
Train station

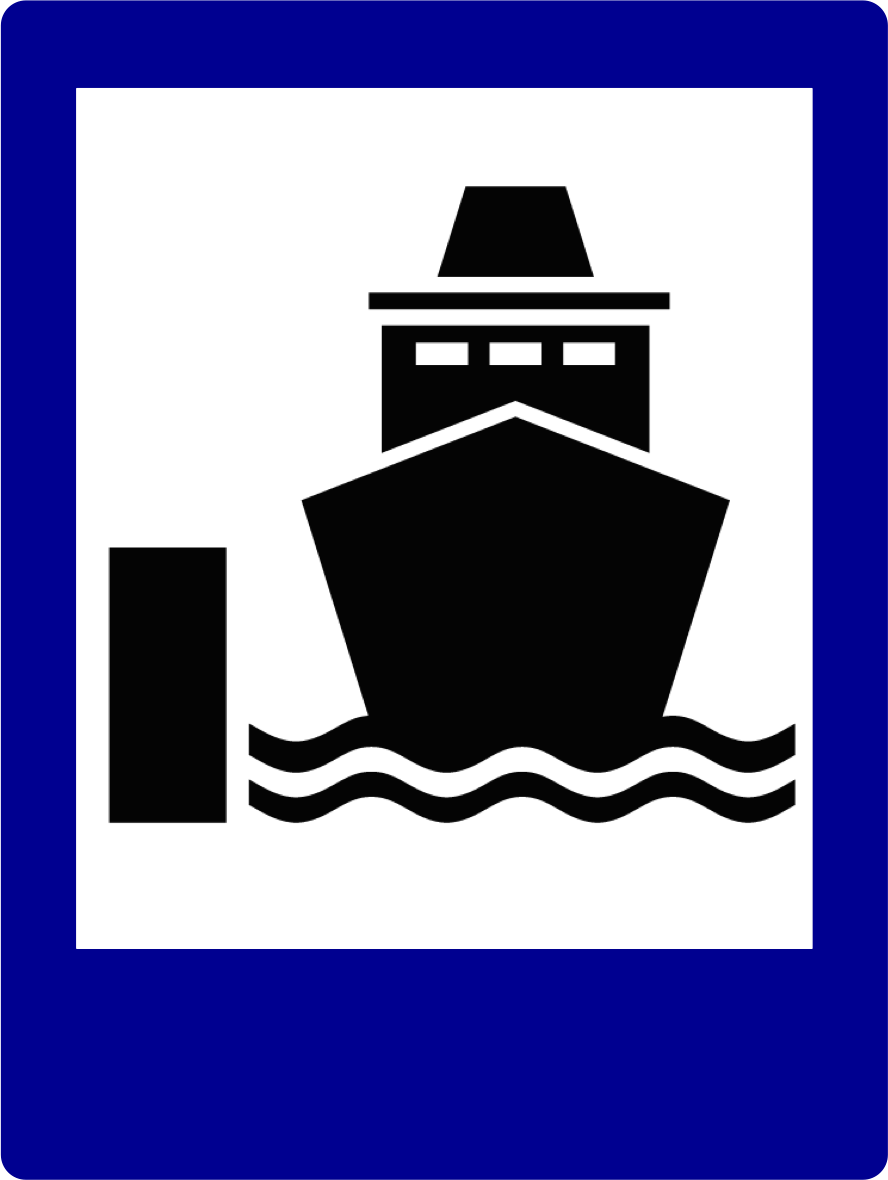
Harbor

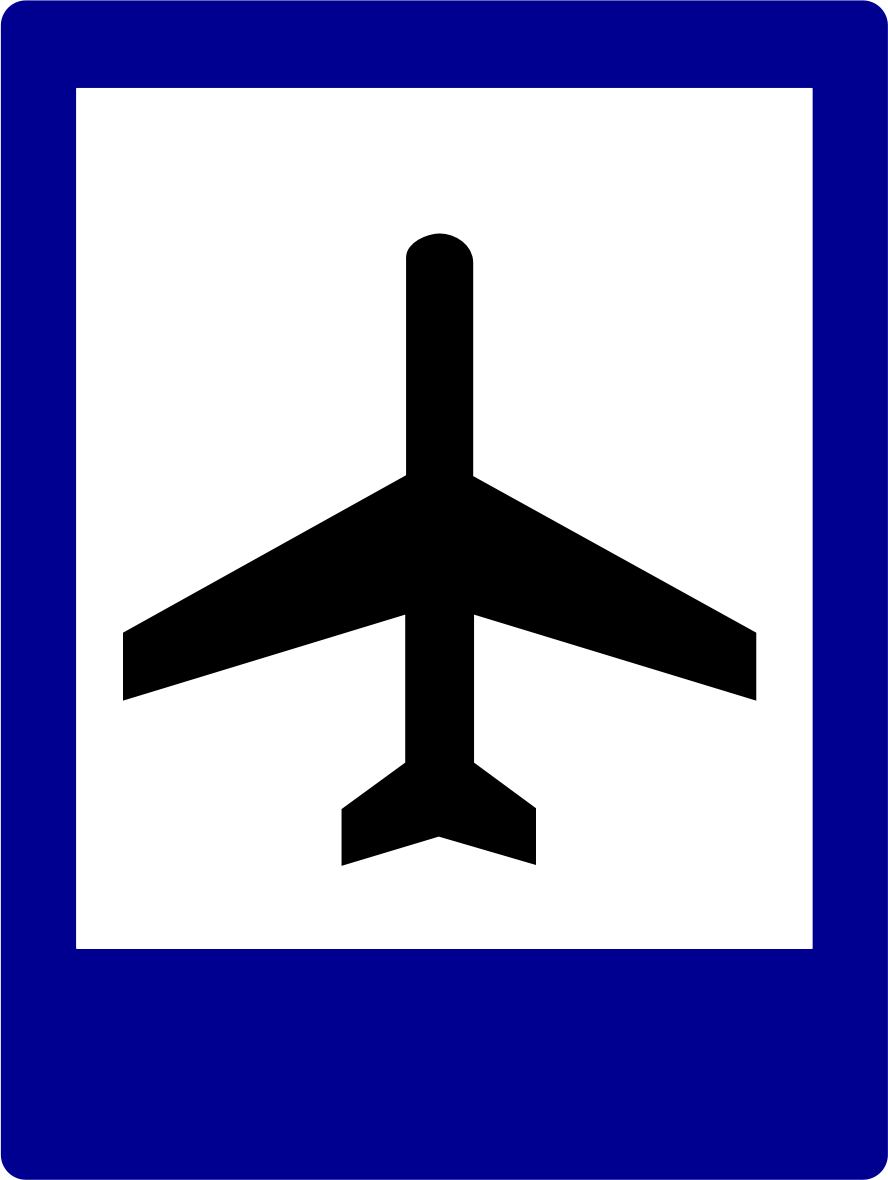
Airport

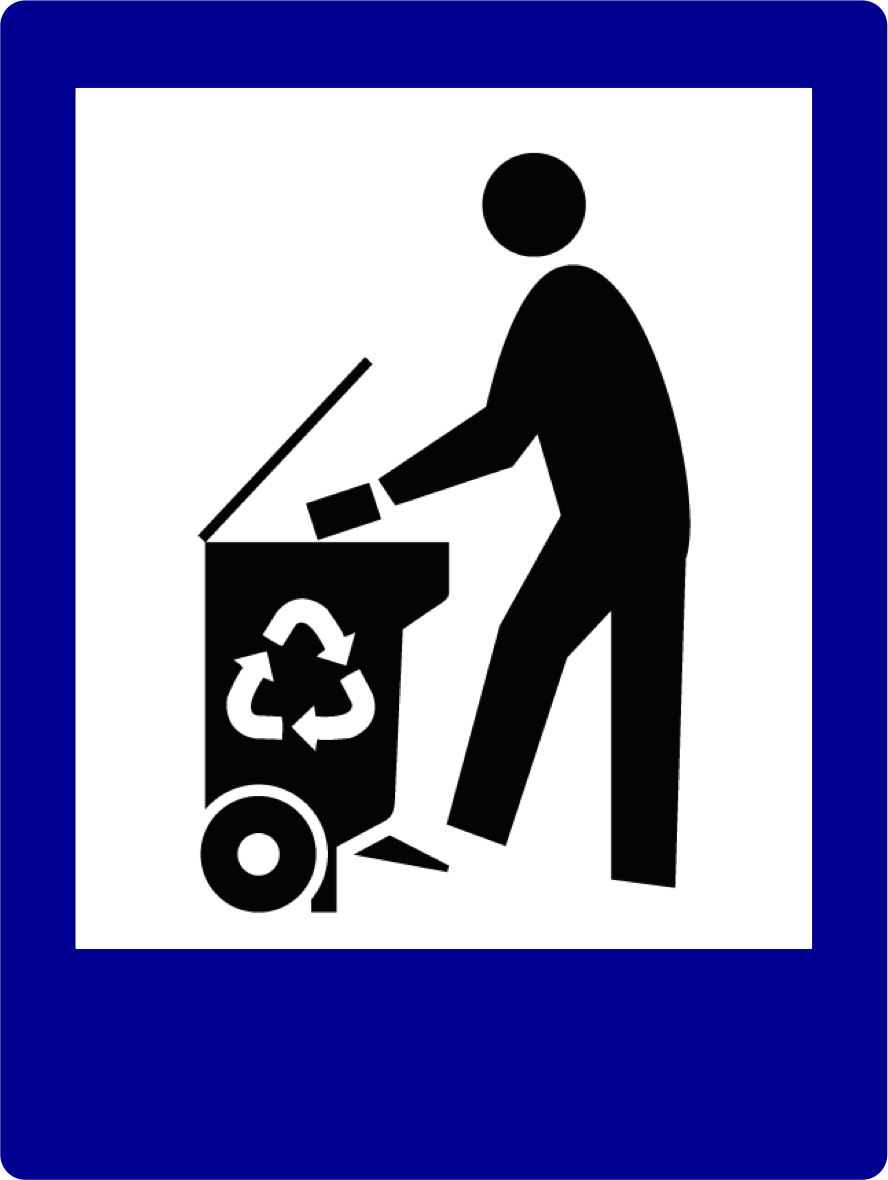
Garbage/Waste disposal

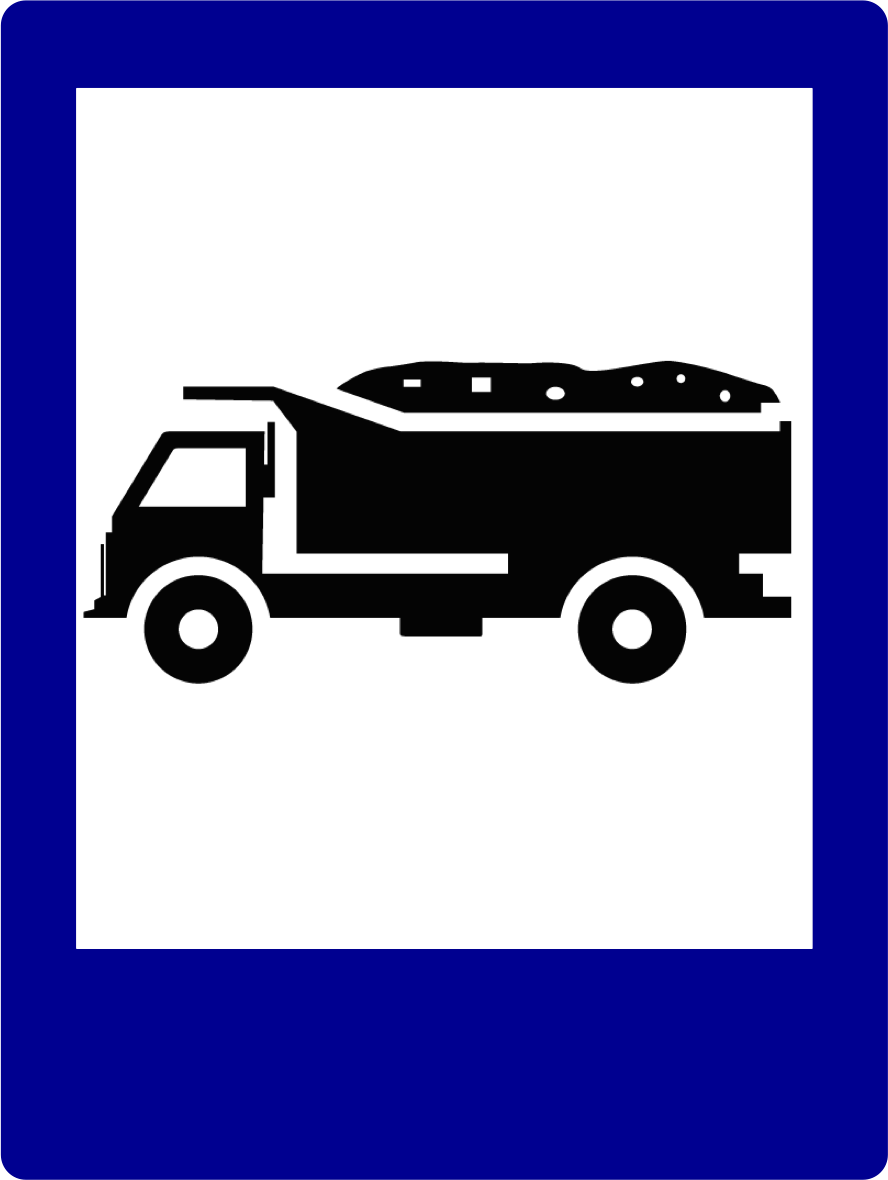
Landfill

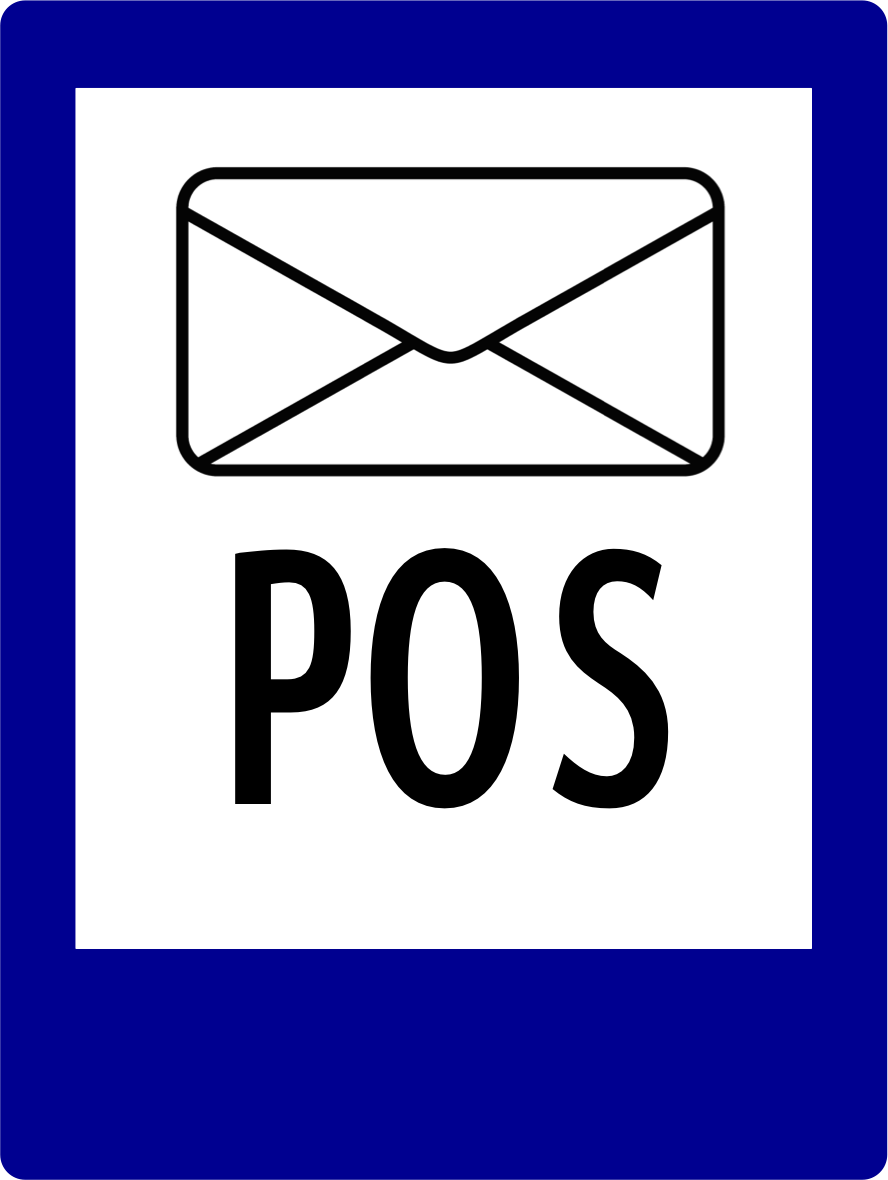
Post office

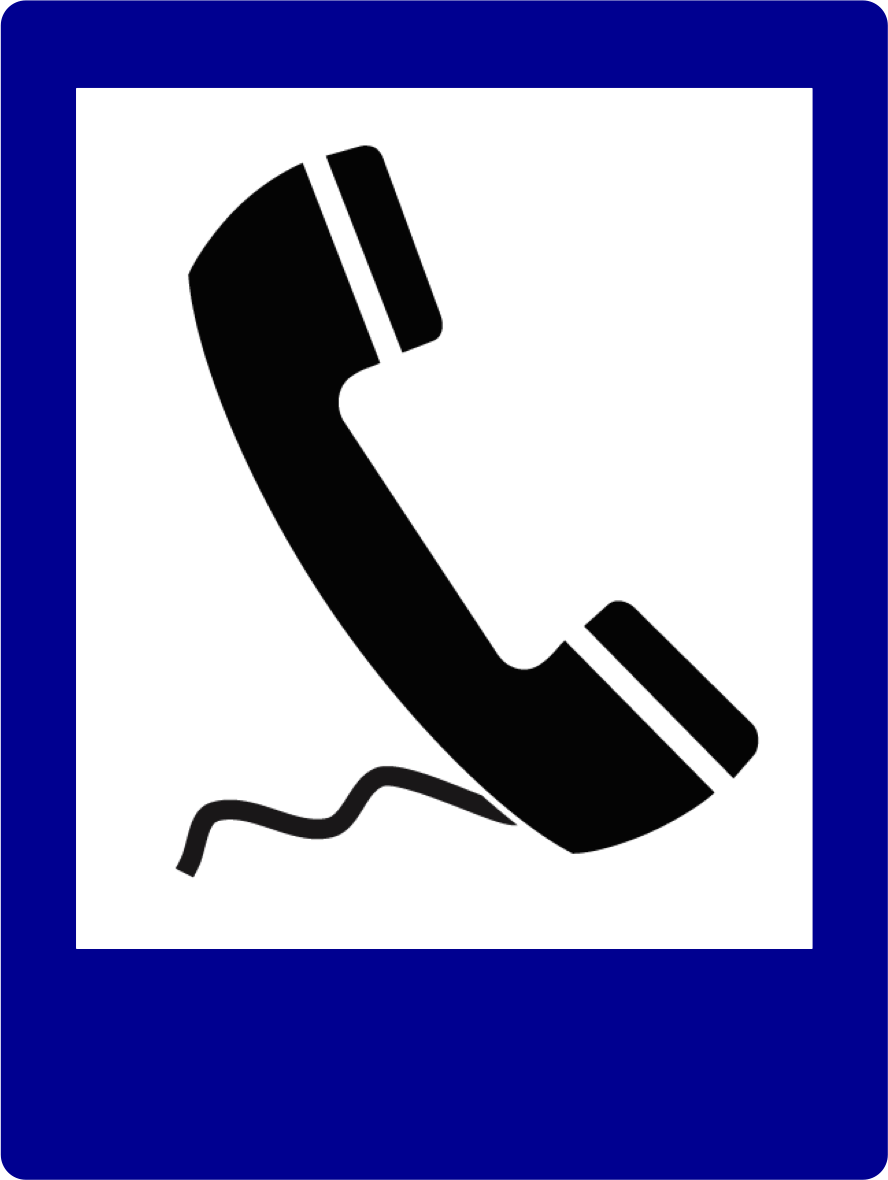
Telephone

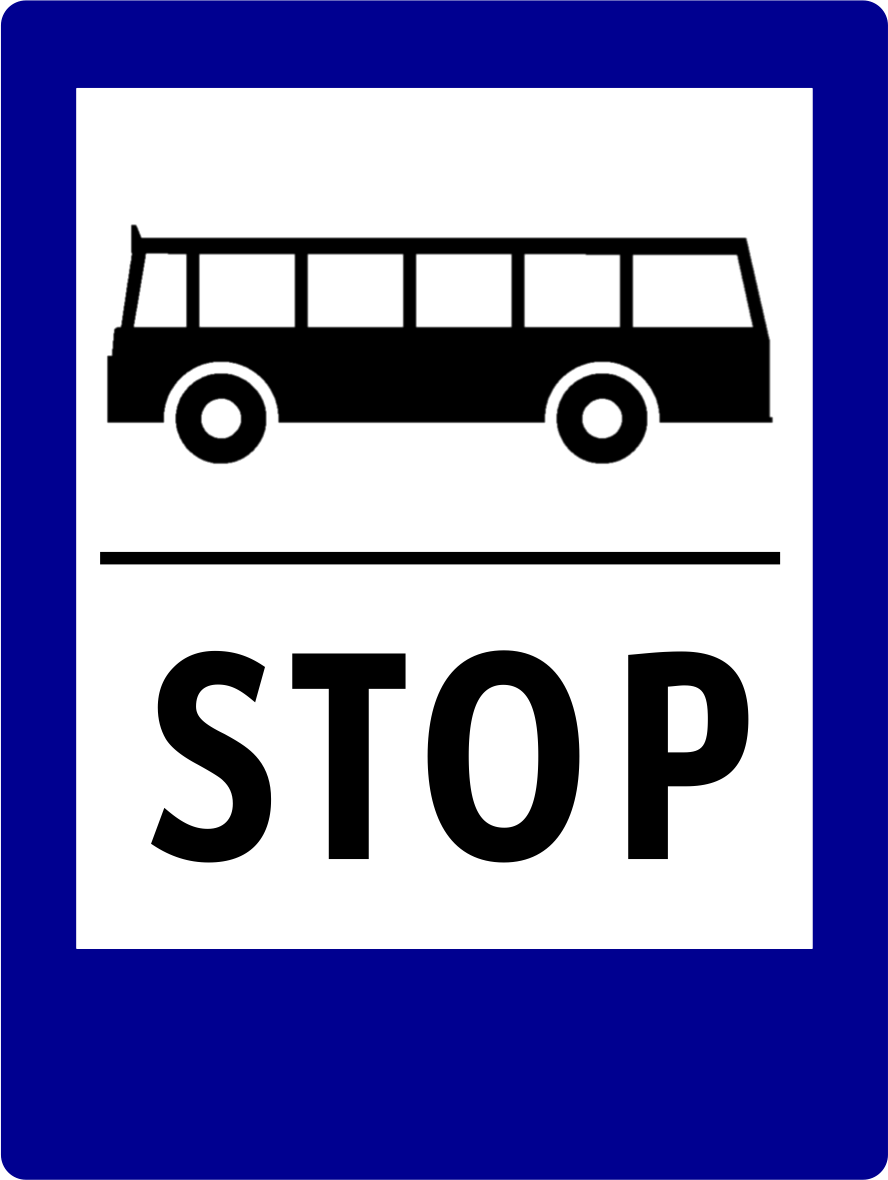
Bus stop

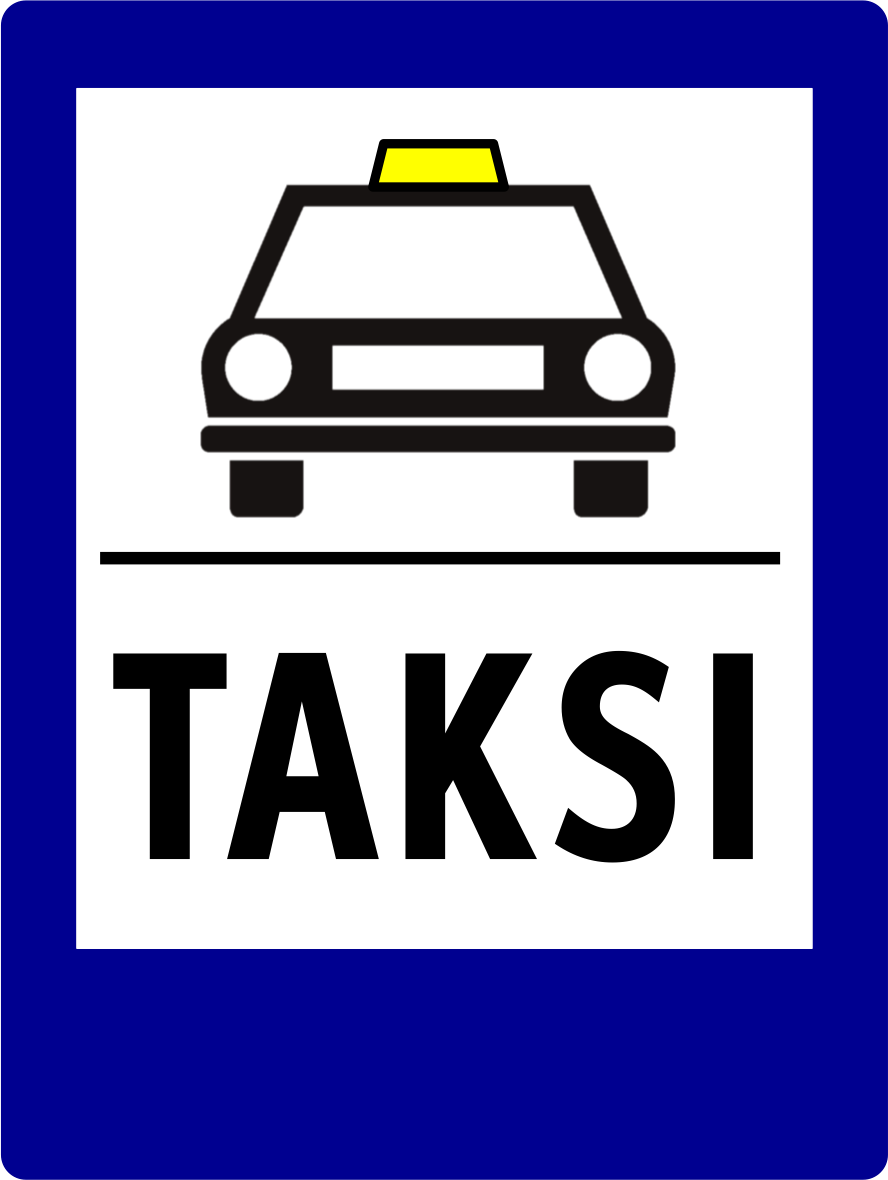
Taxi stand

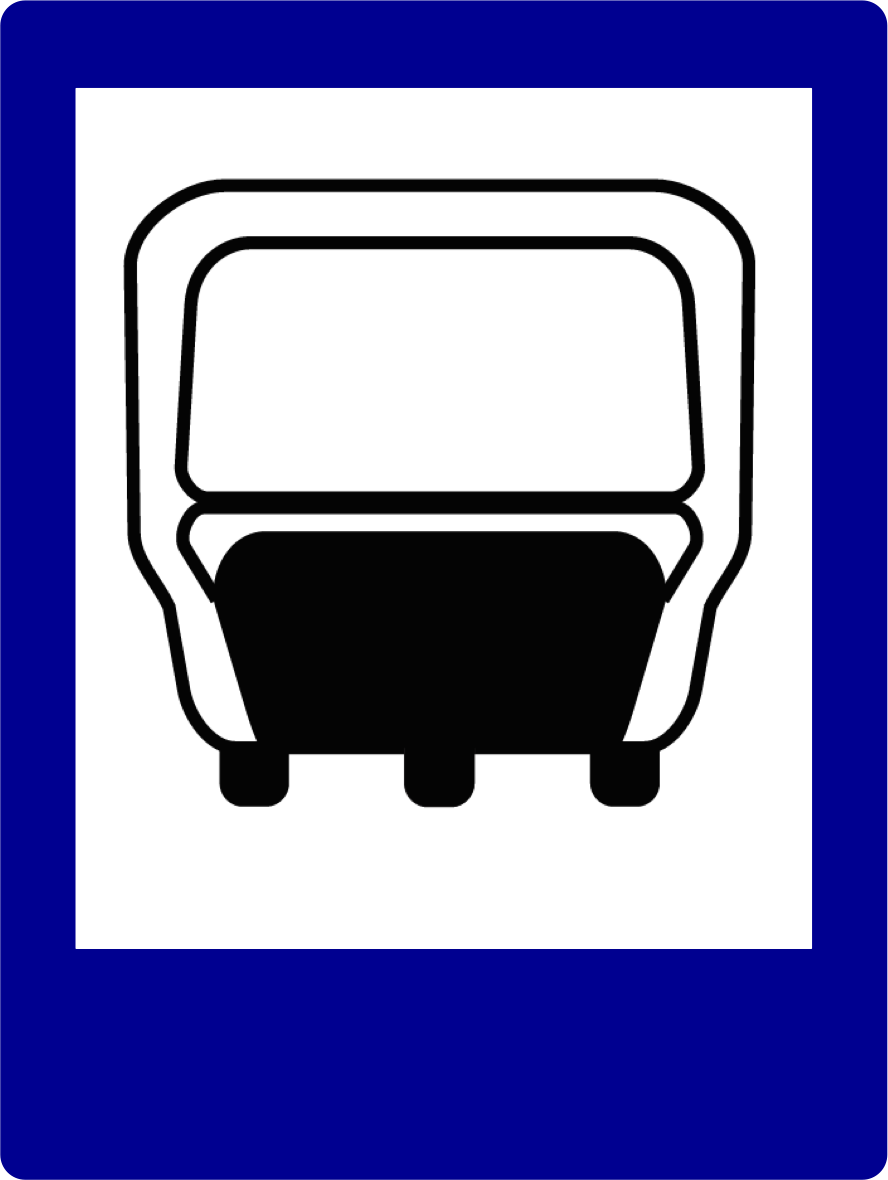
Transit stop

Crosswalk

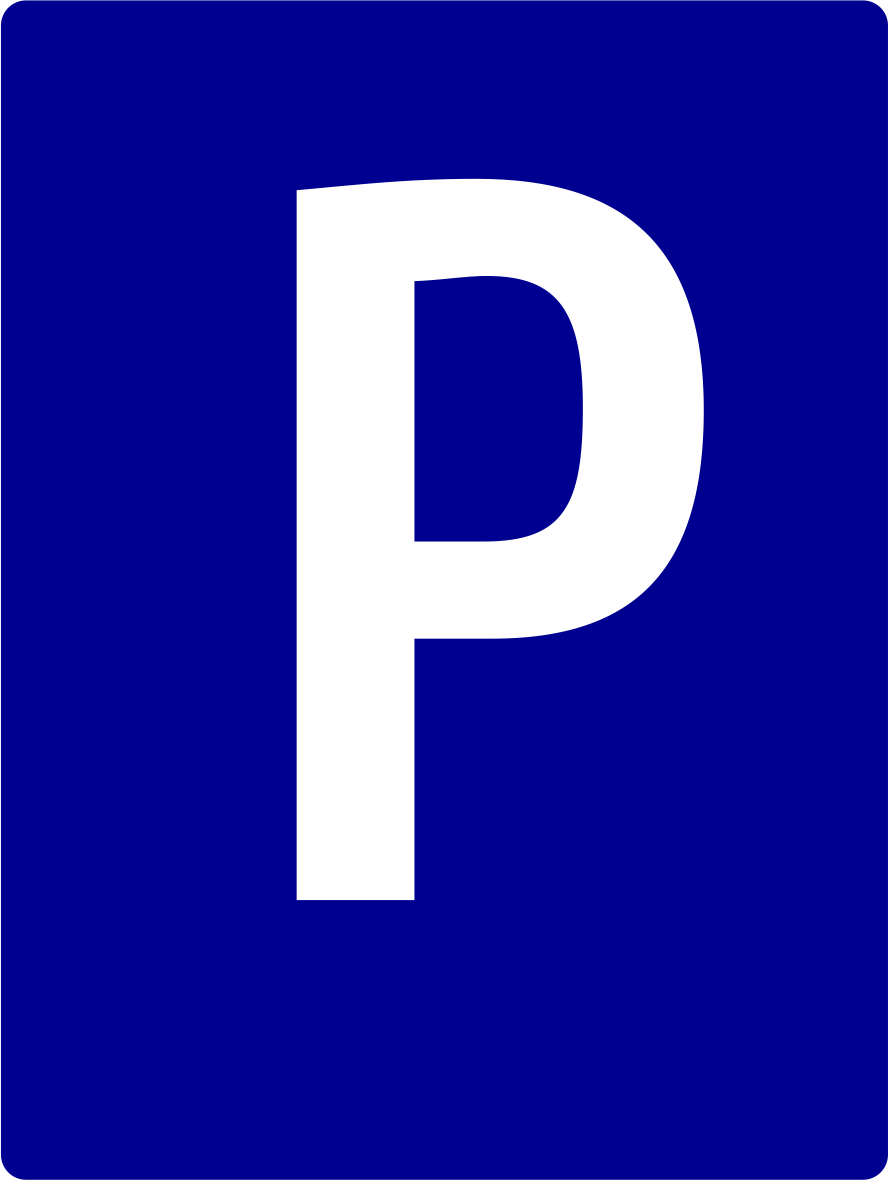
Parking

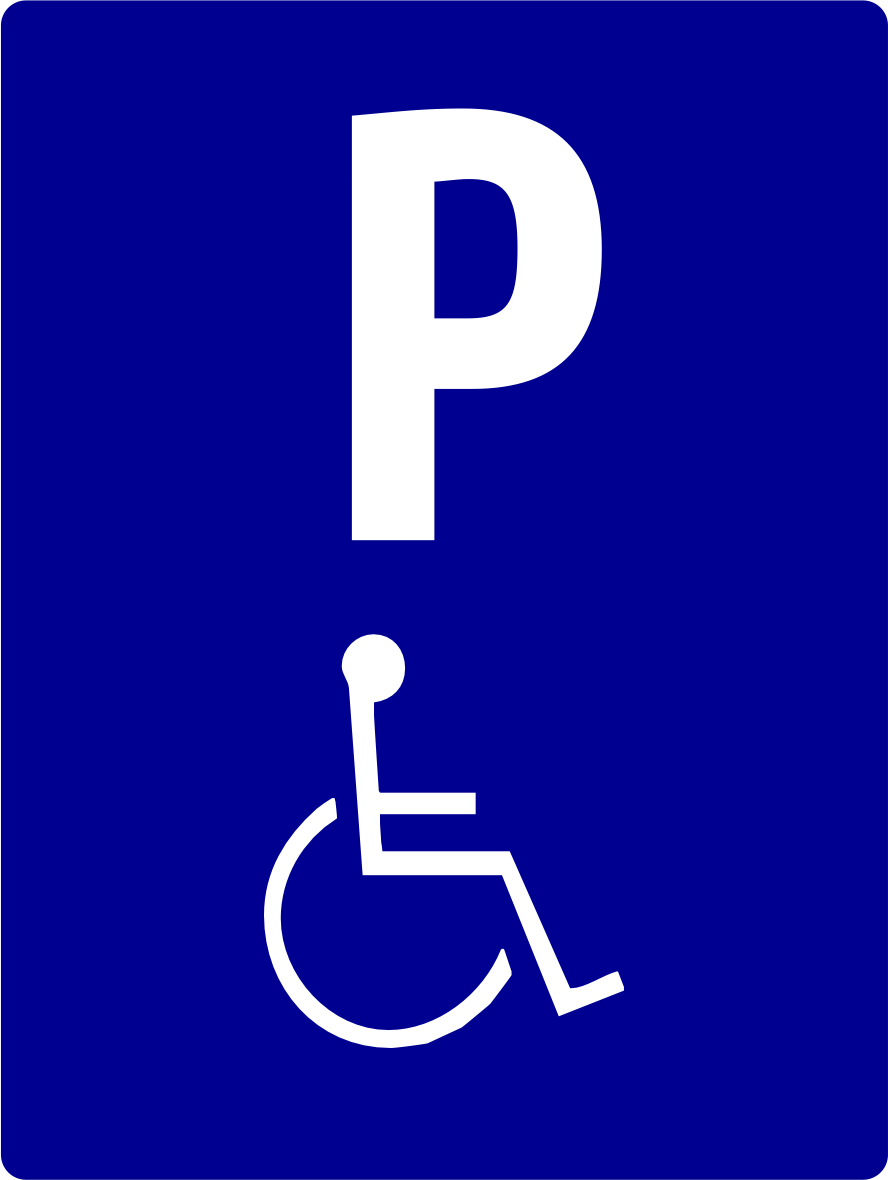
Disabled parking area

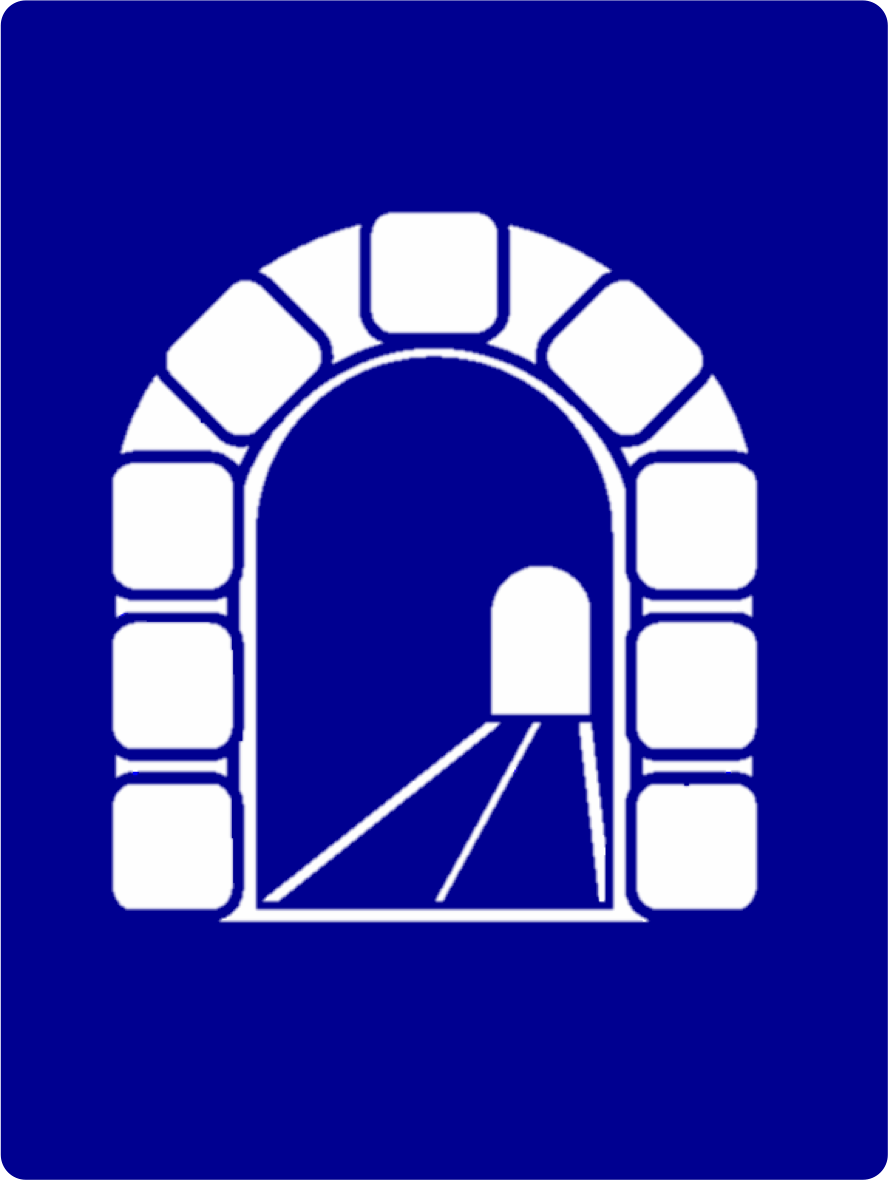
Tunnel Ahead

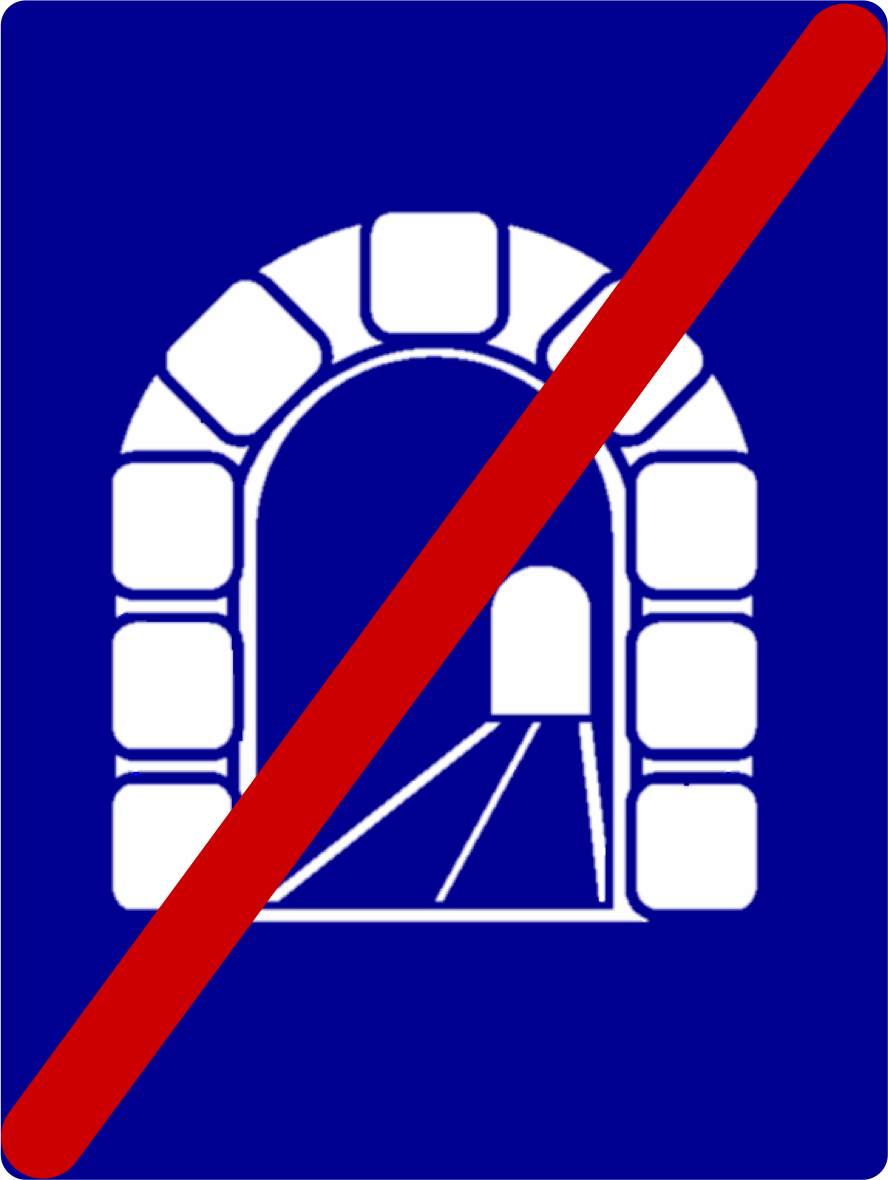
End of tunnel

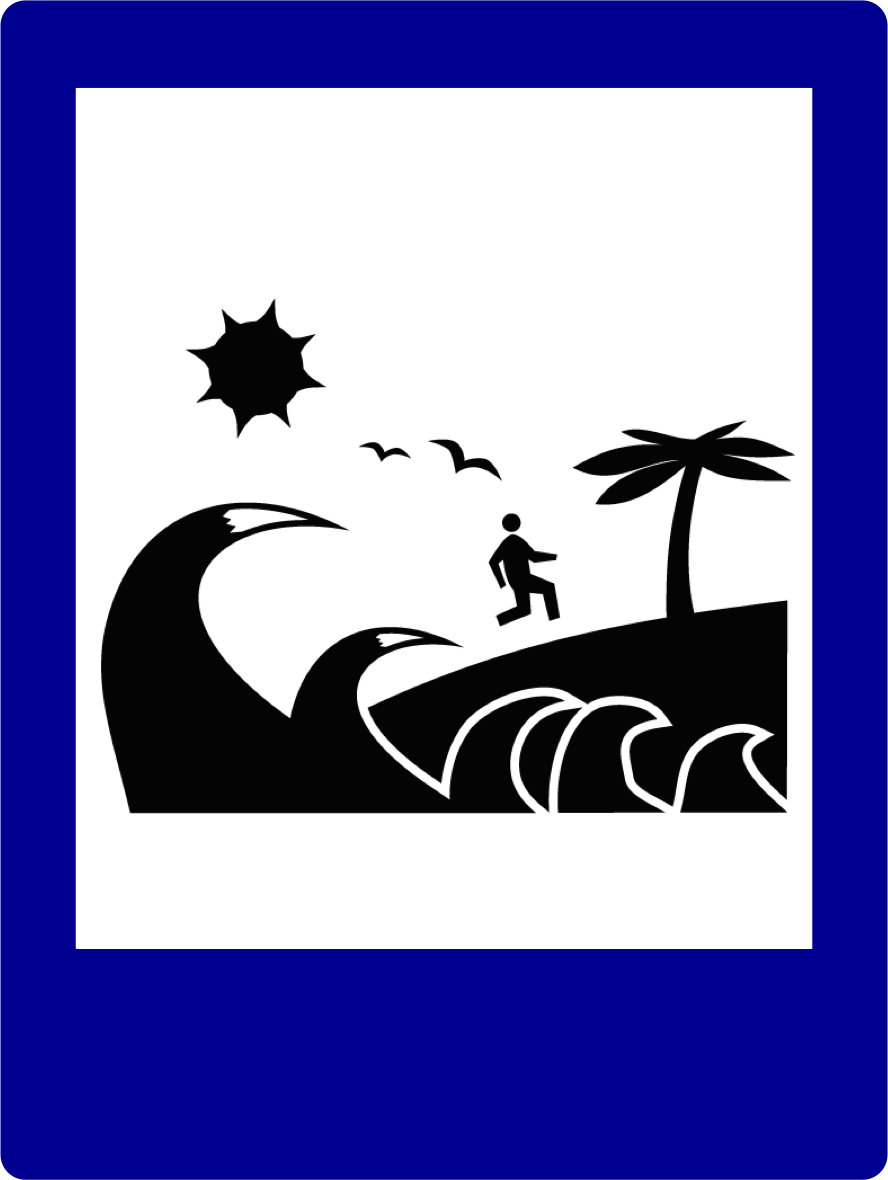
Tsunami evacuation route

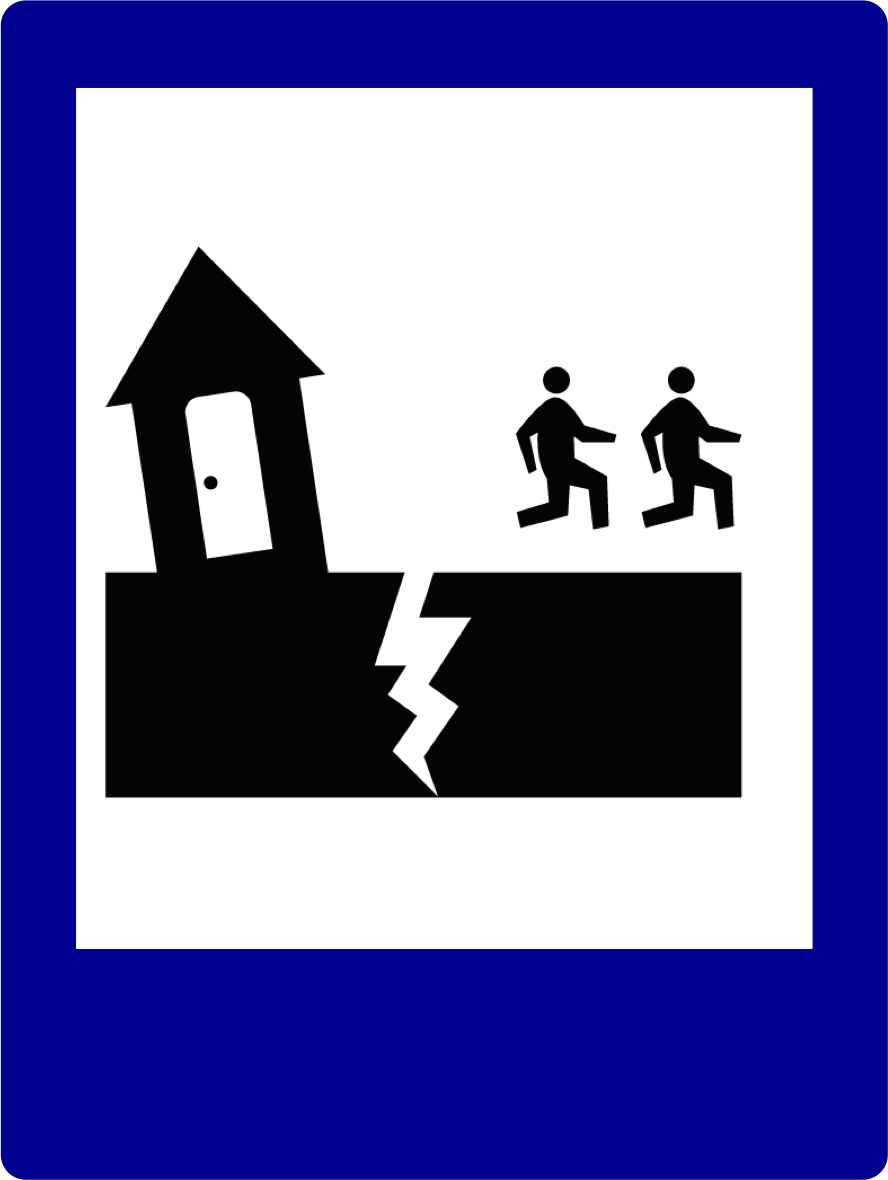
Earthquake evacuation route

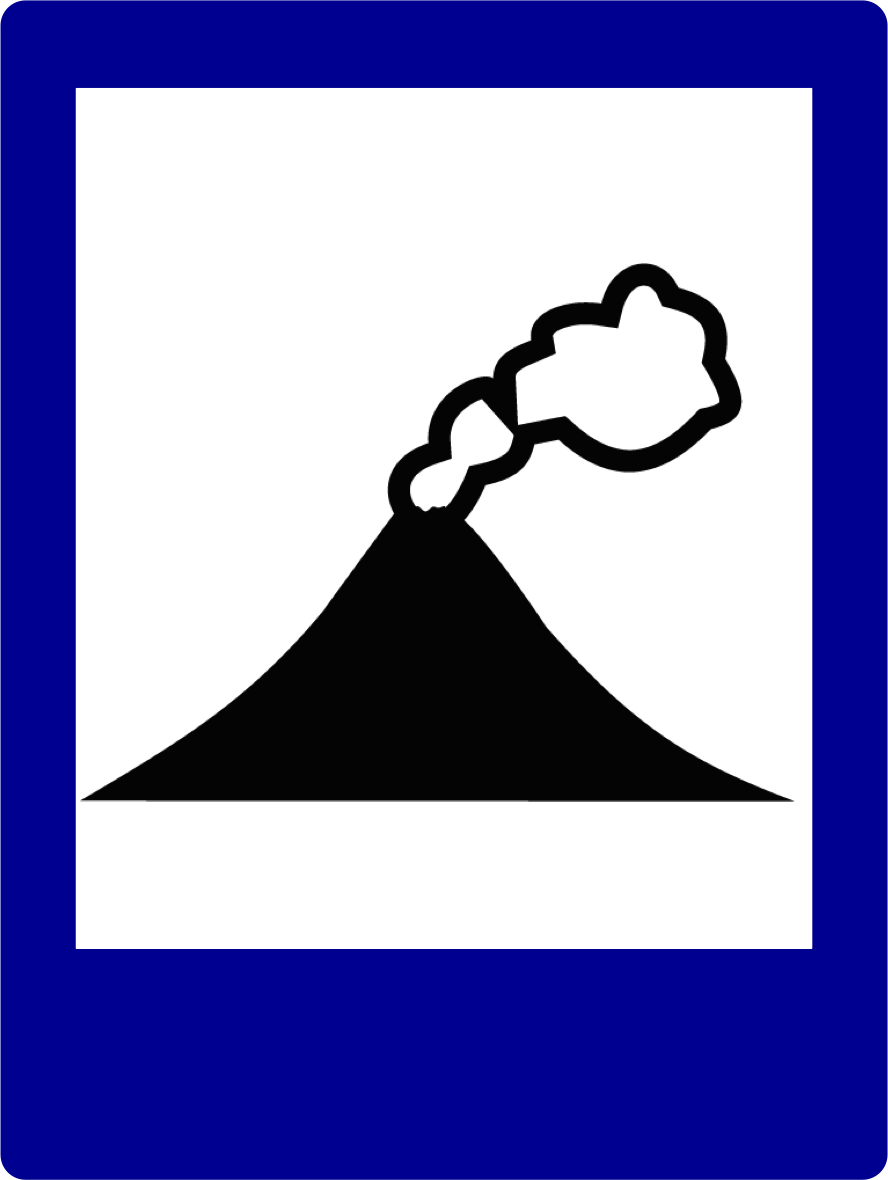
Volcano eruption evacuation route

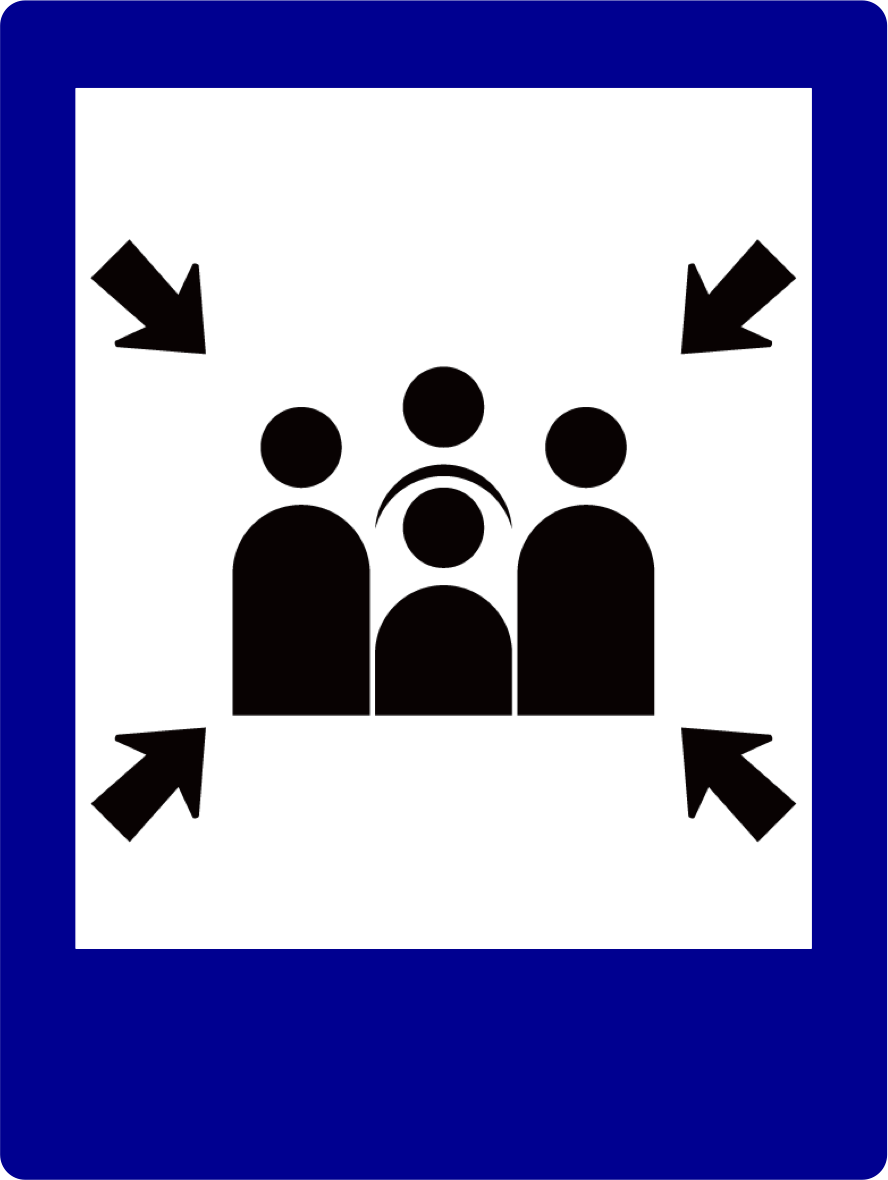
Emergency muster zone

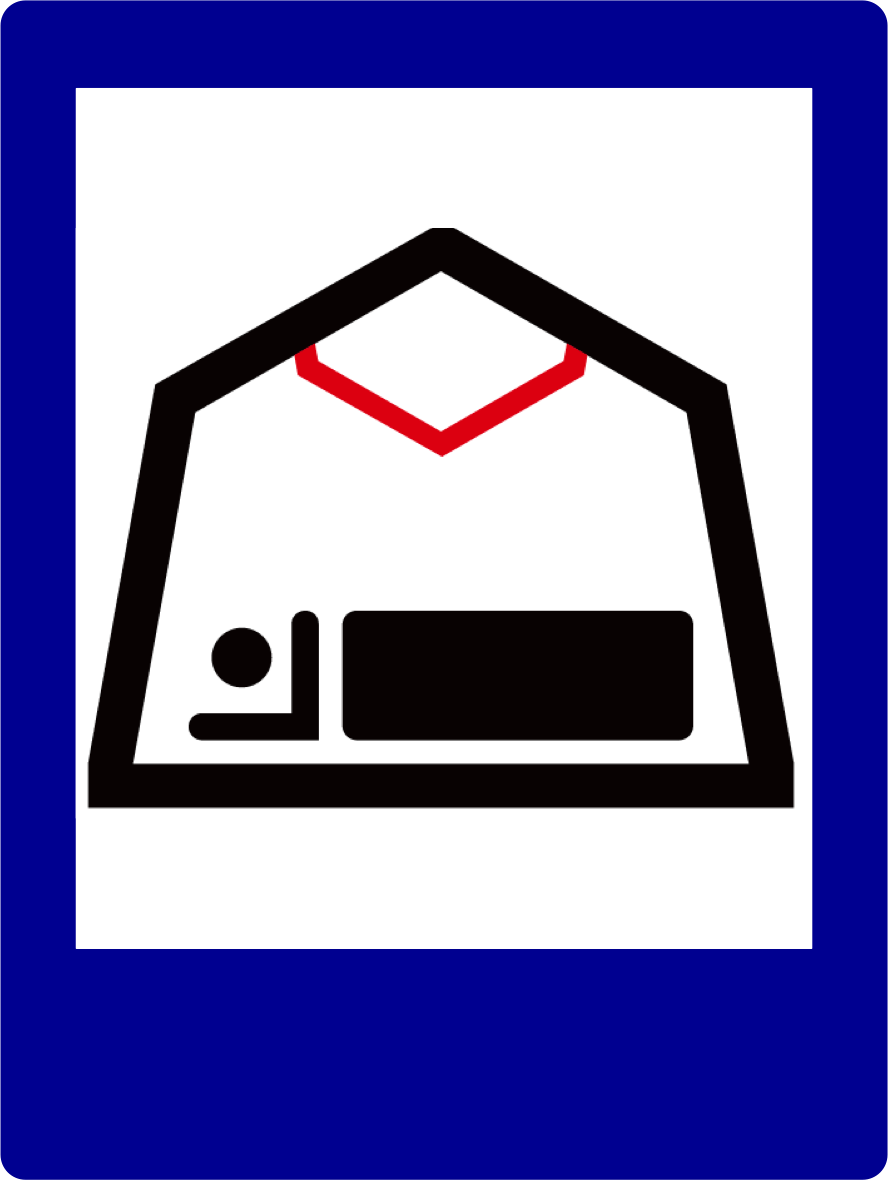
Refuge camp

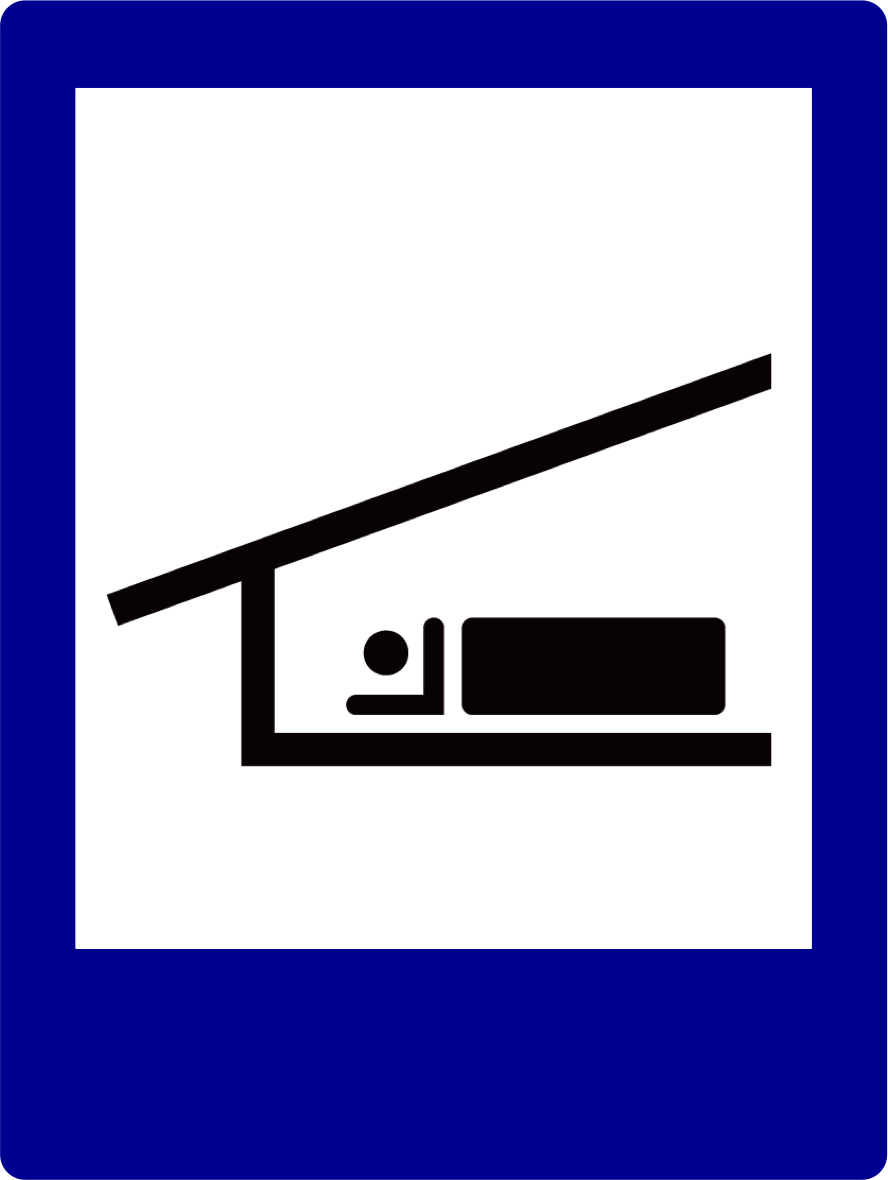
Refuge centre

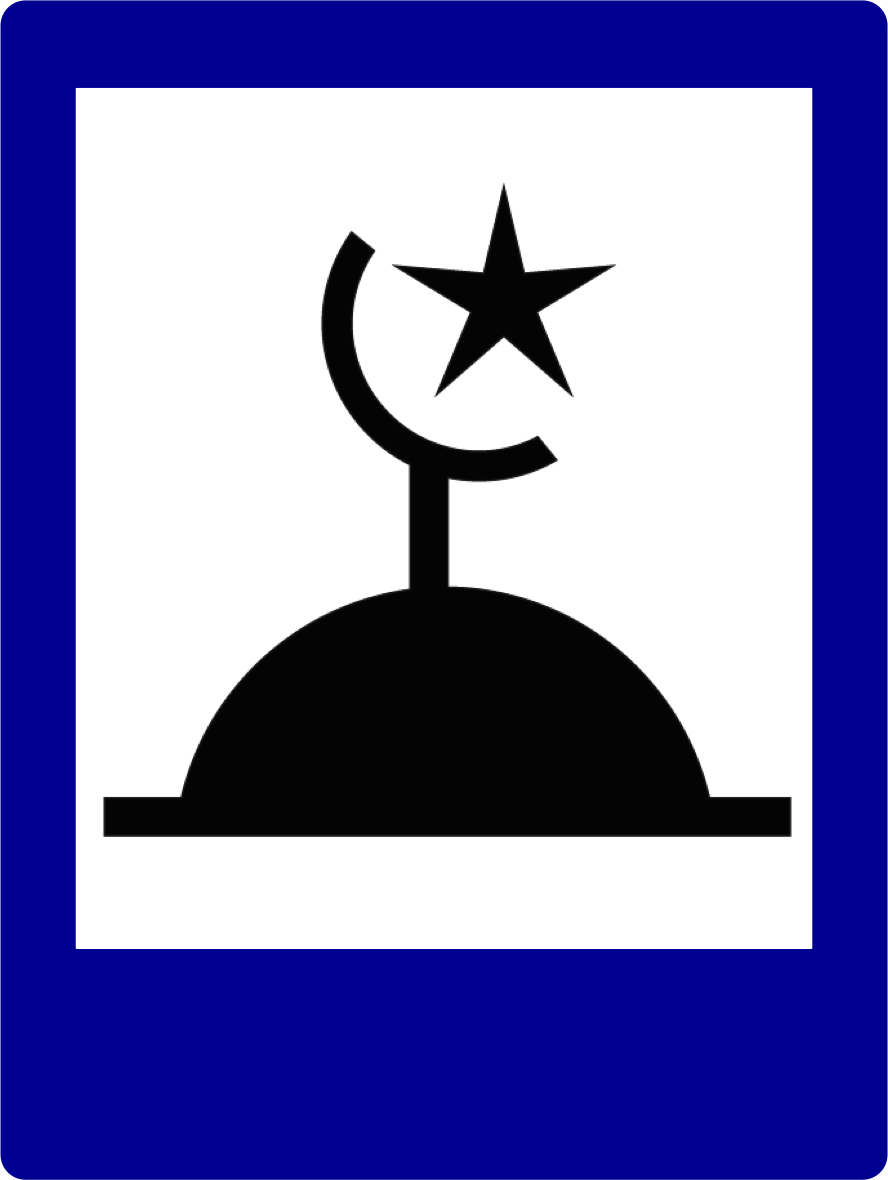
Mosque

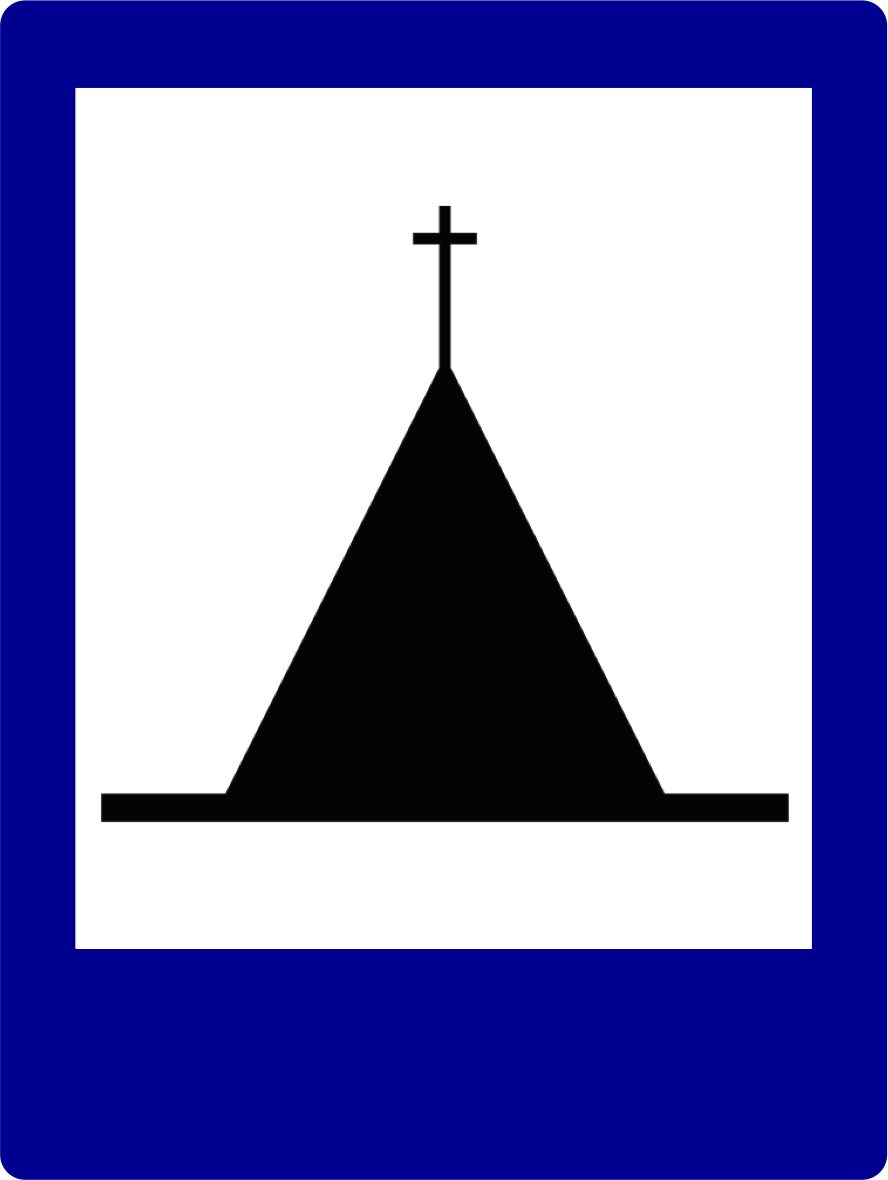
Church

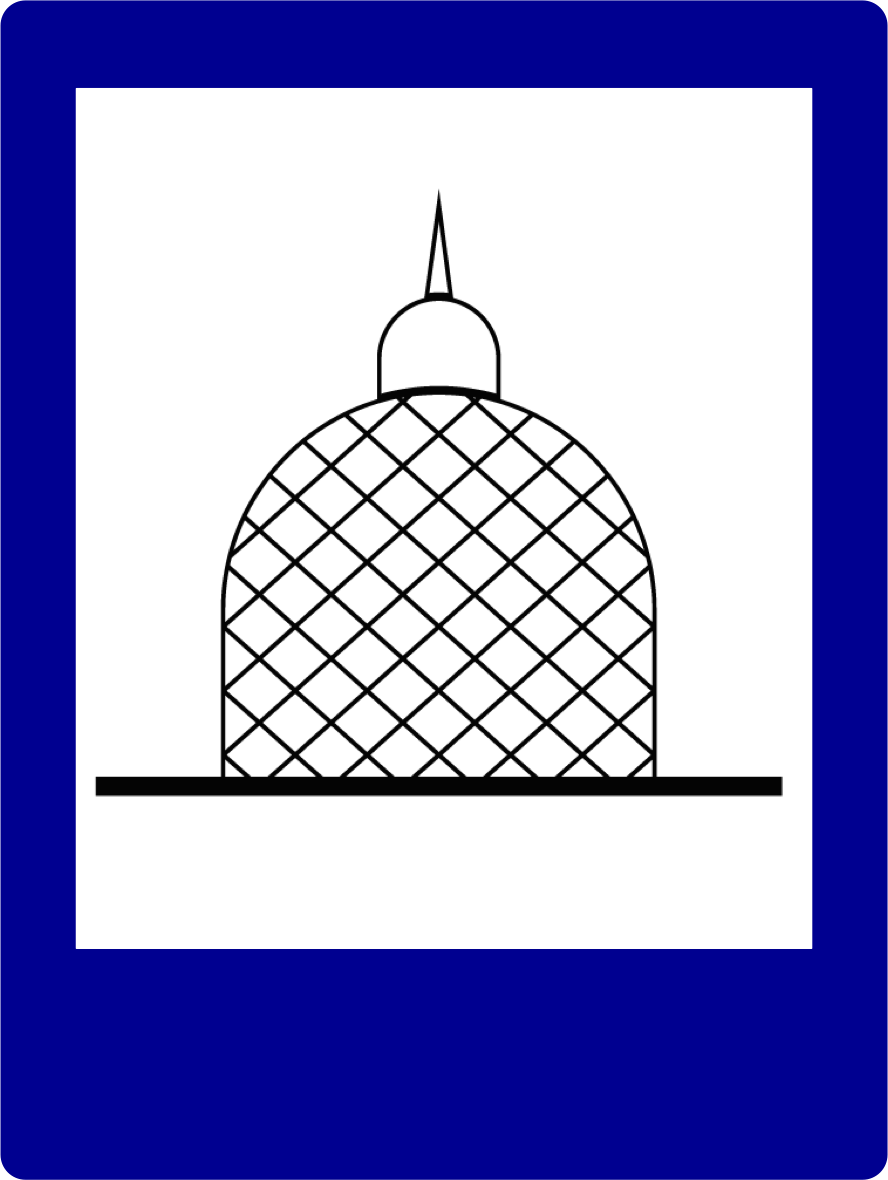
Vihara

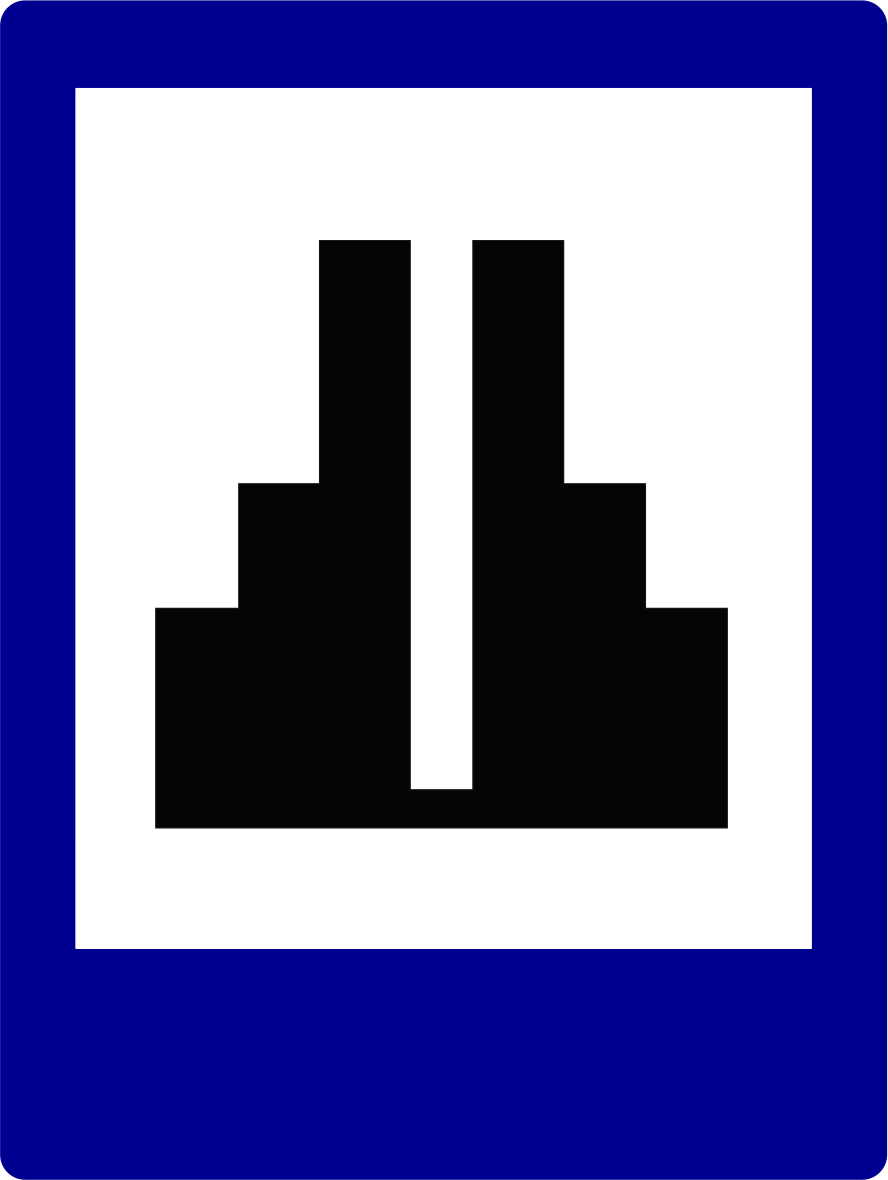
Hindu temple

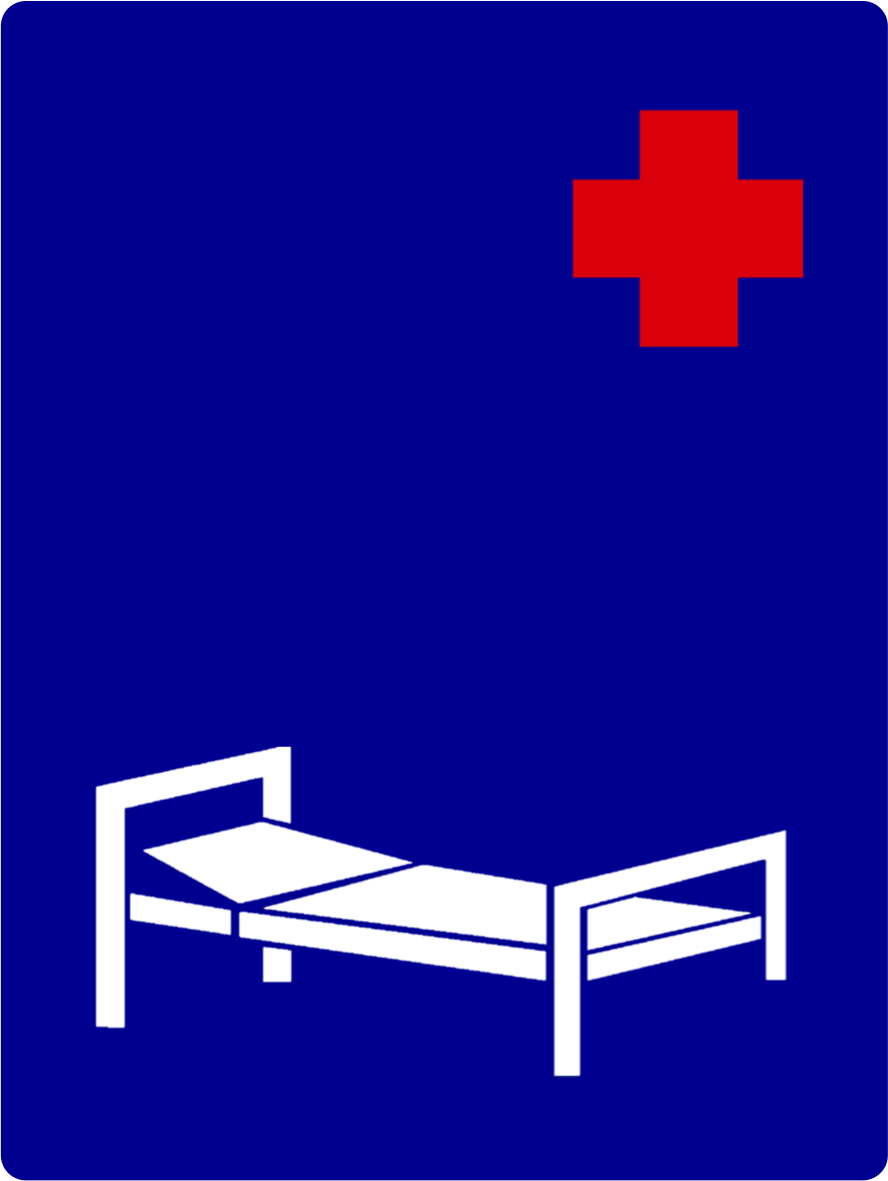
Hospital

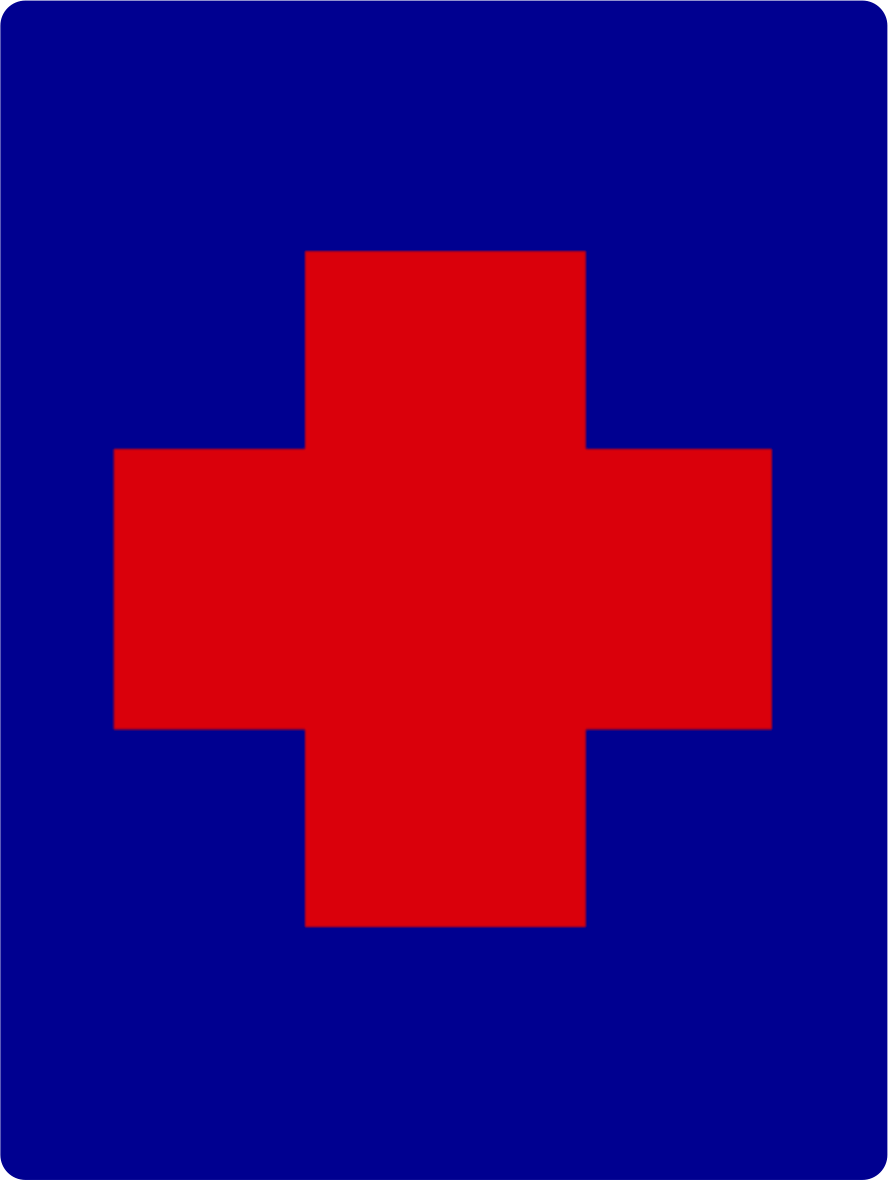
Clinic, Community Health Centre

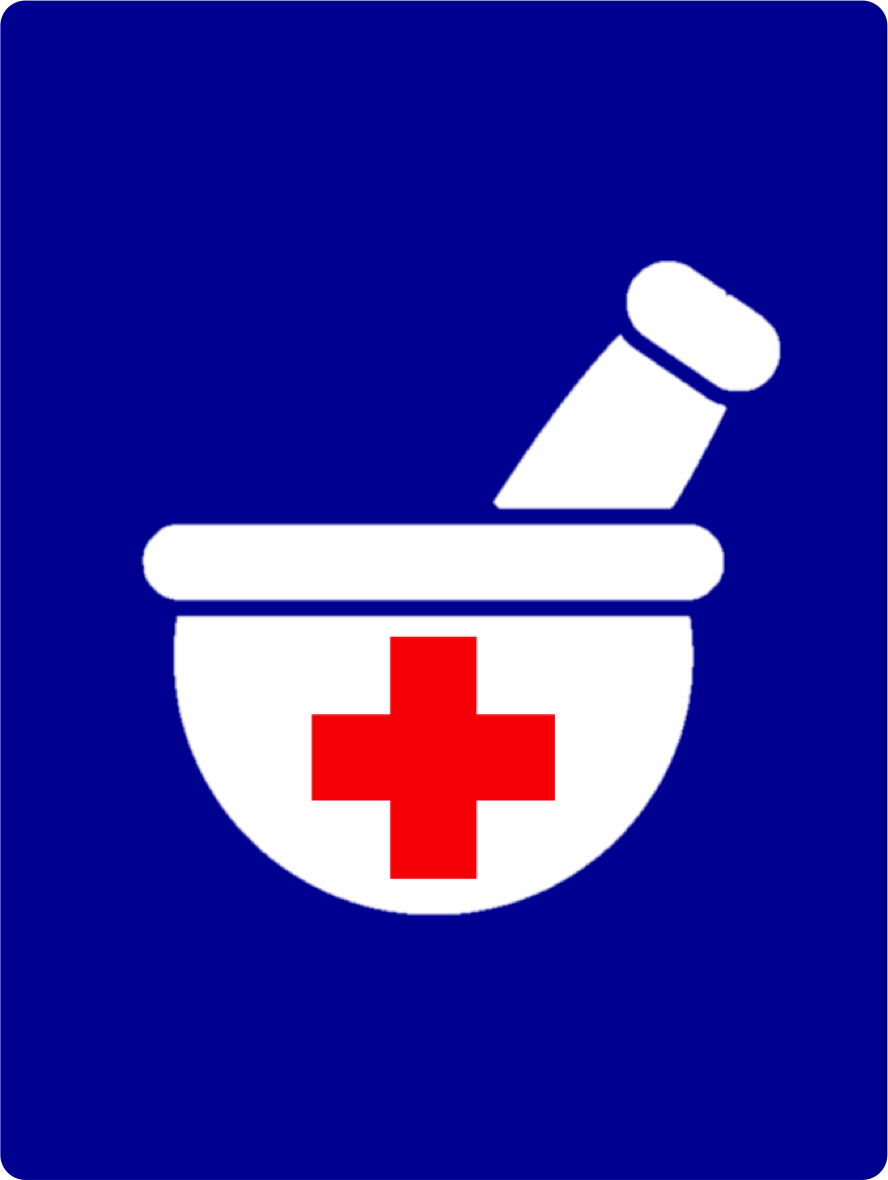
Pharmacy

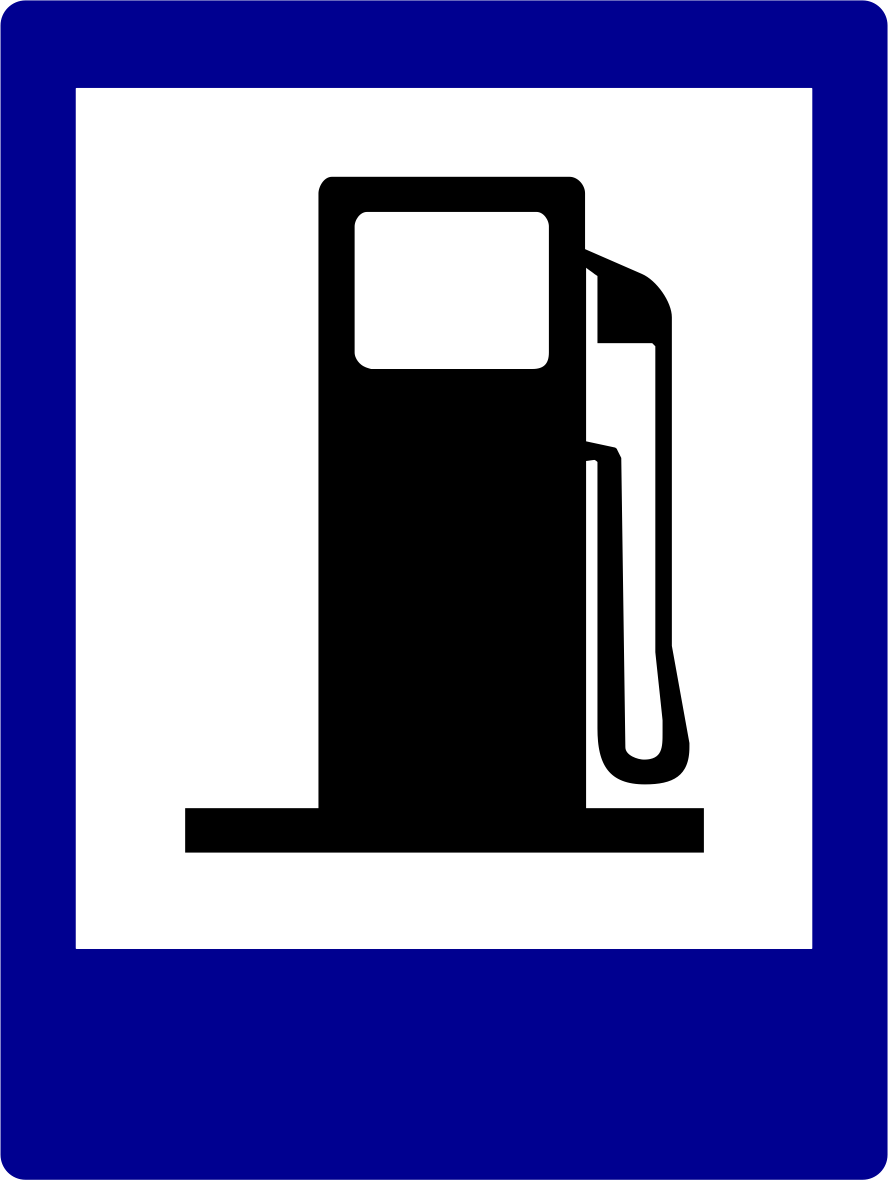
Petrol station

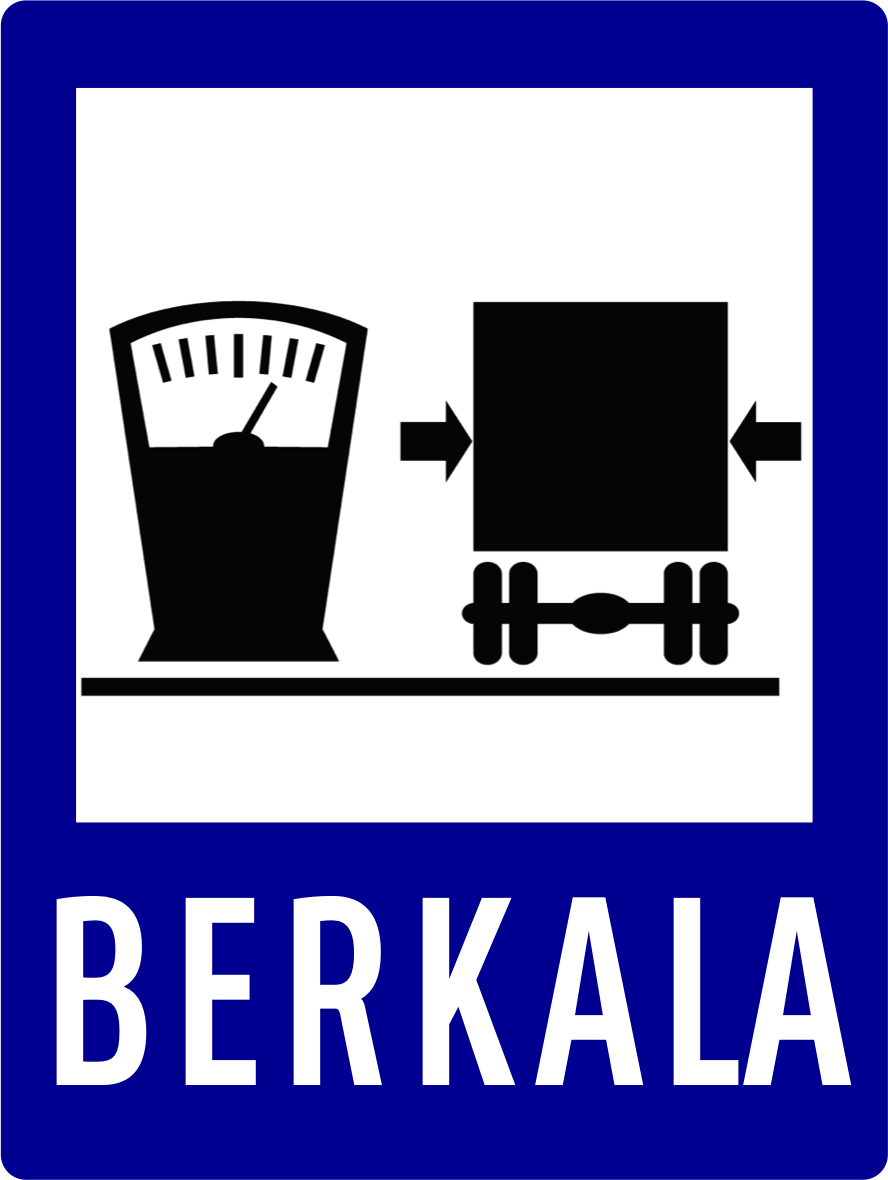
Scheduled service station

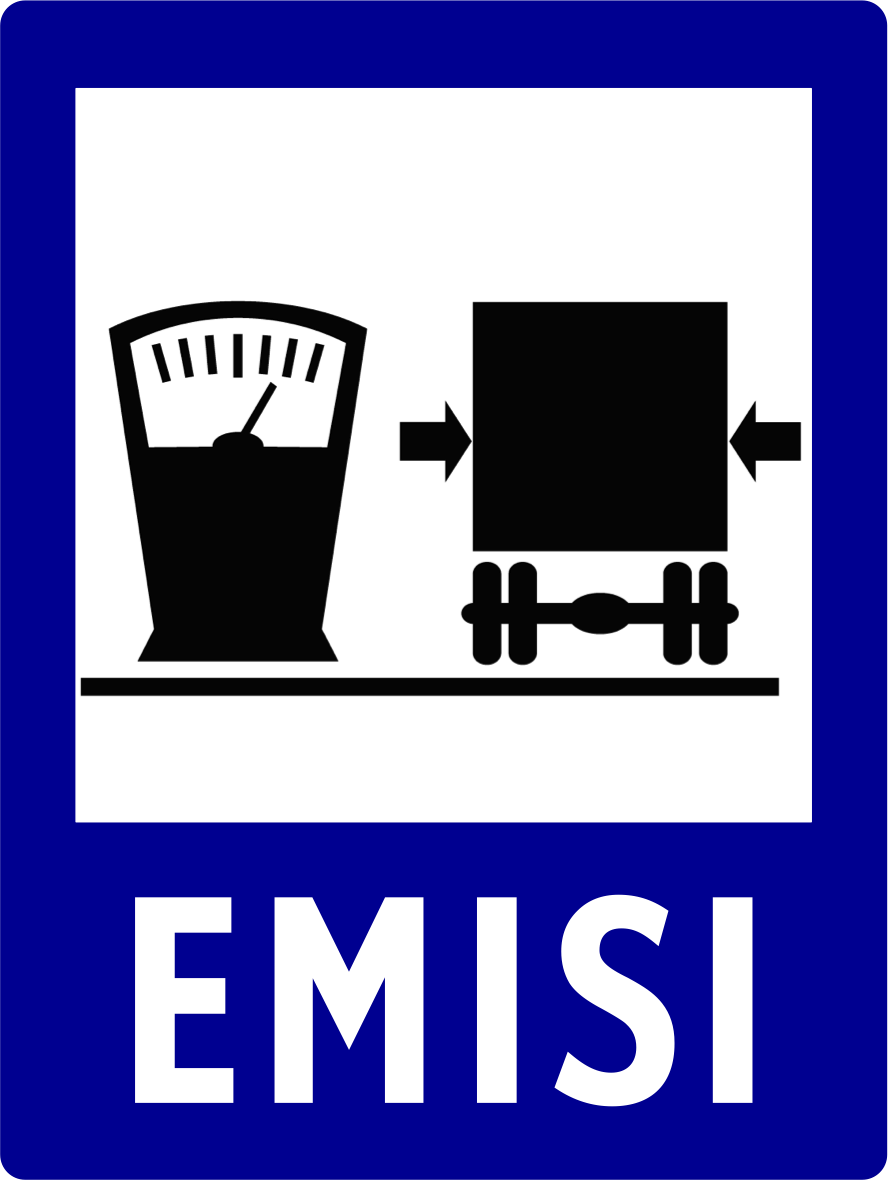
Emission service station

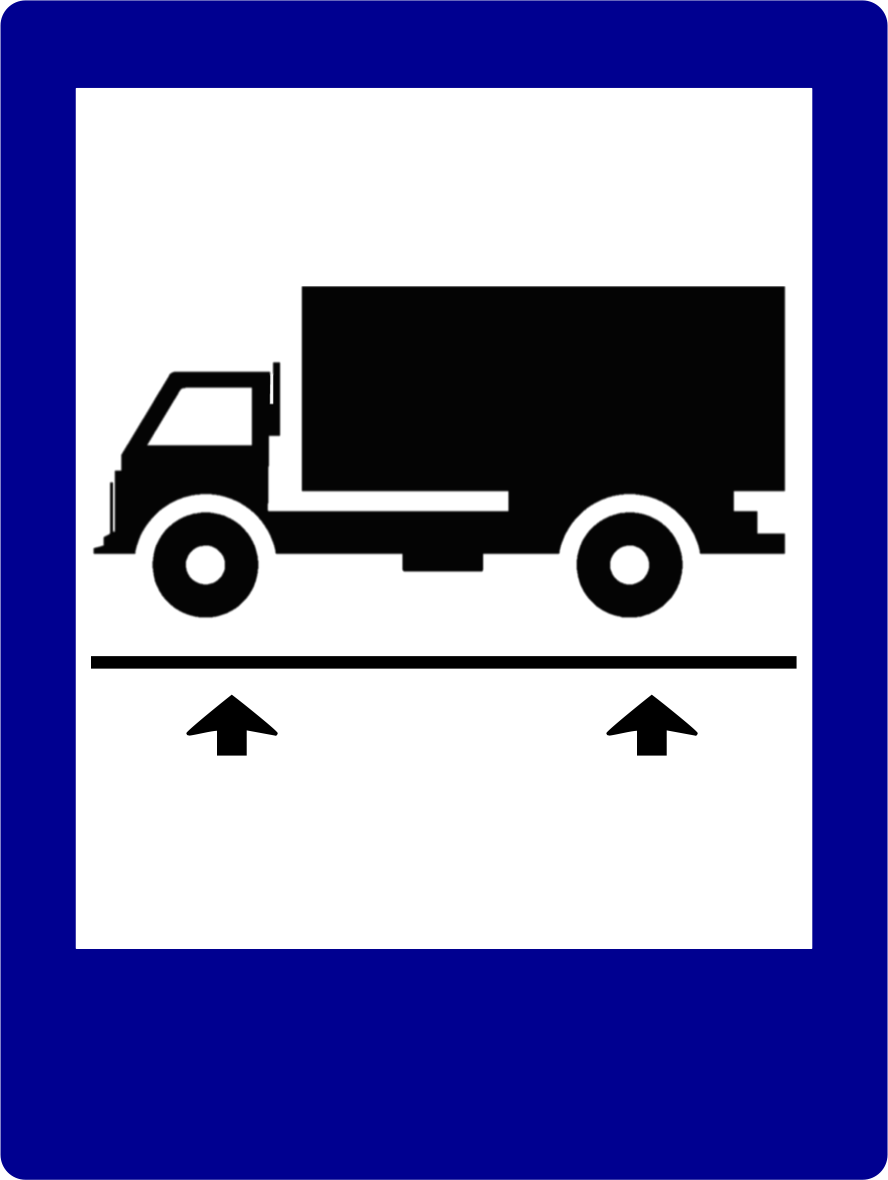
Weight station

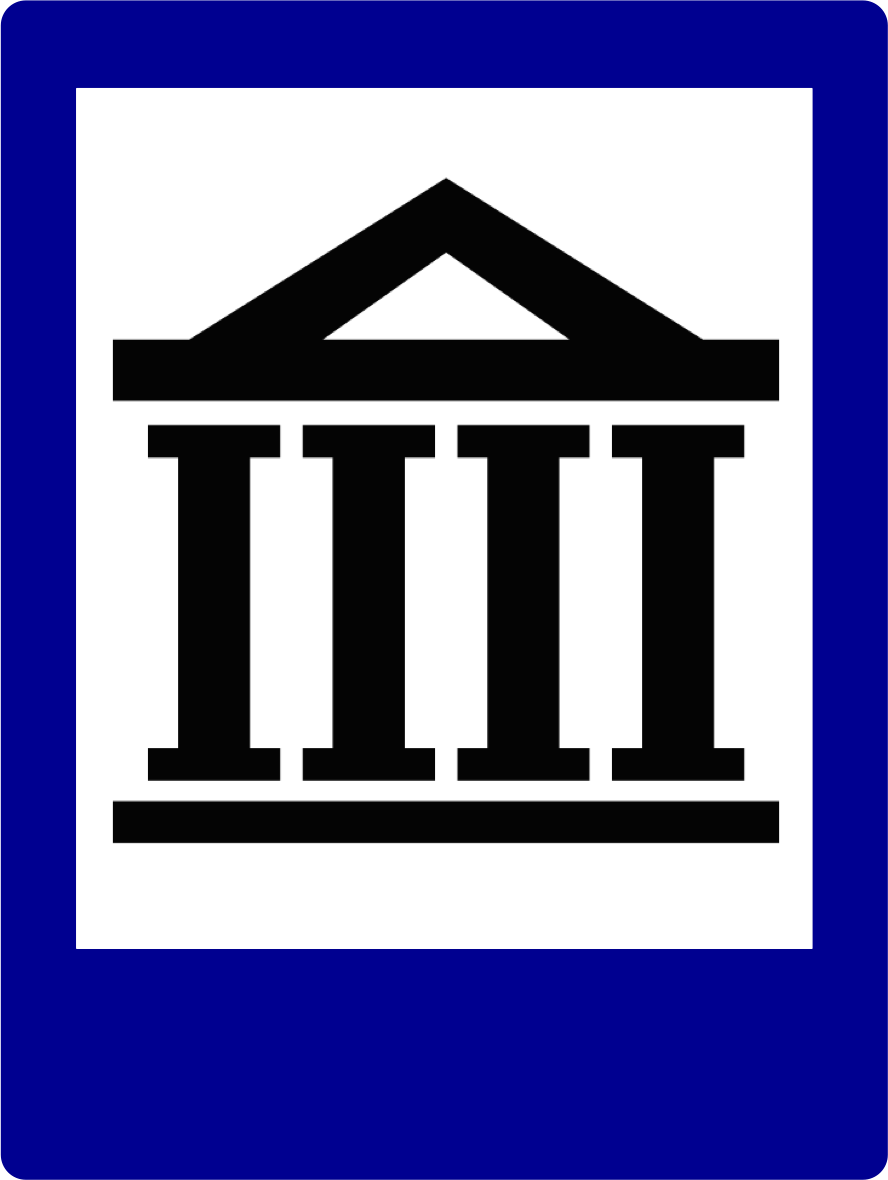
Museum

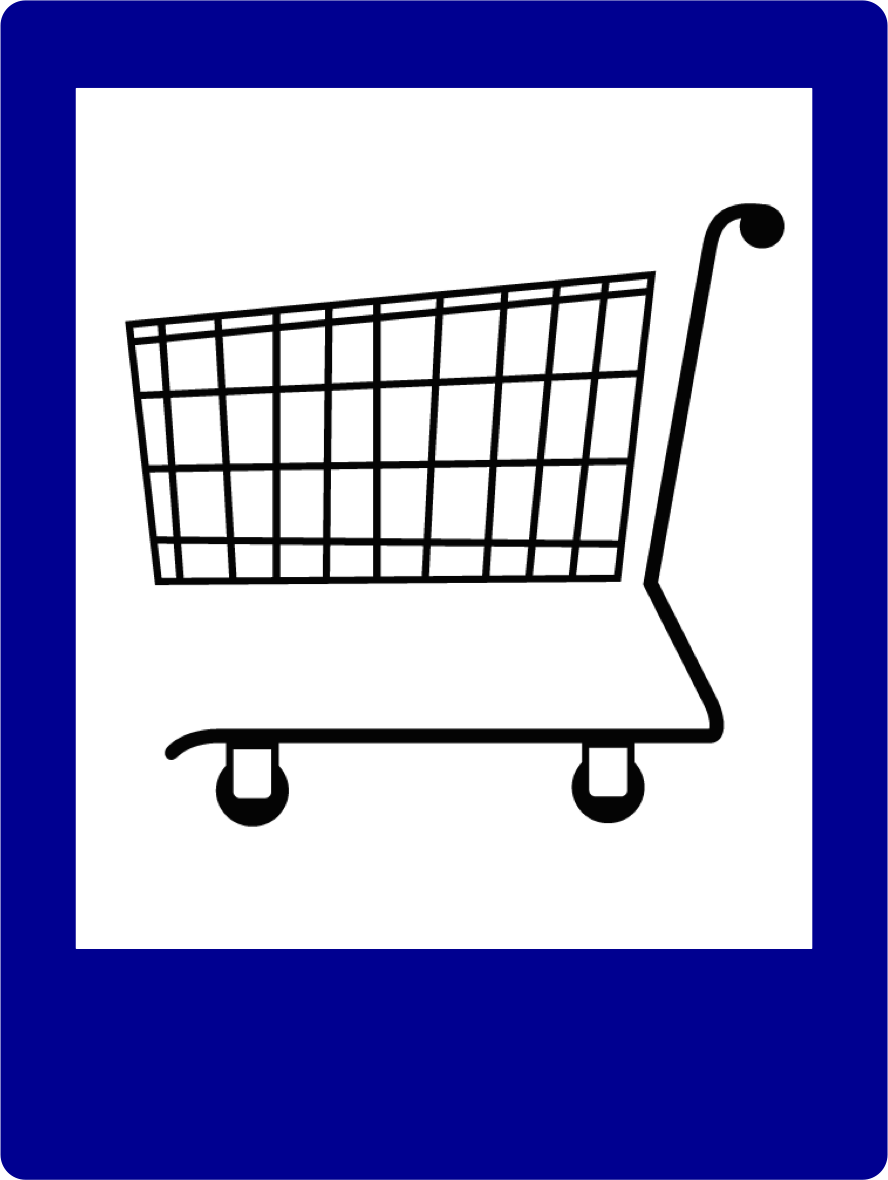
Supermarket

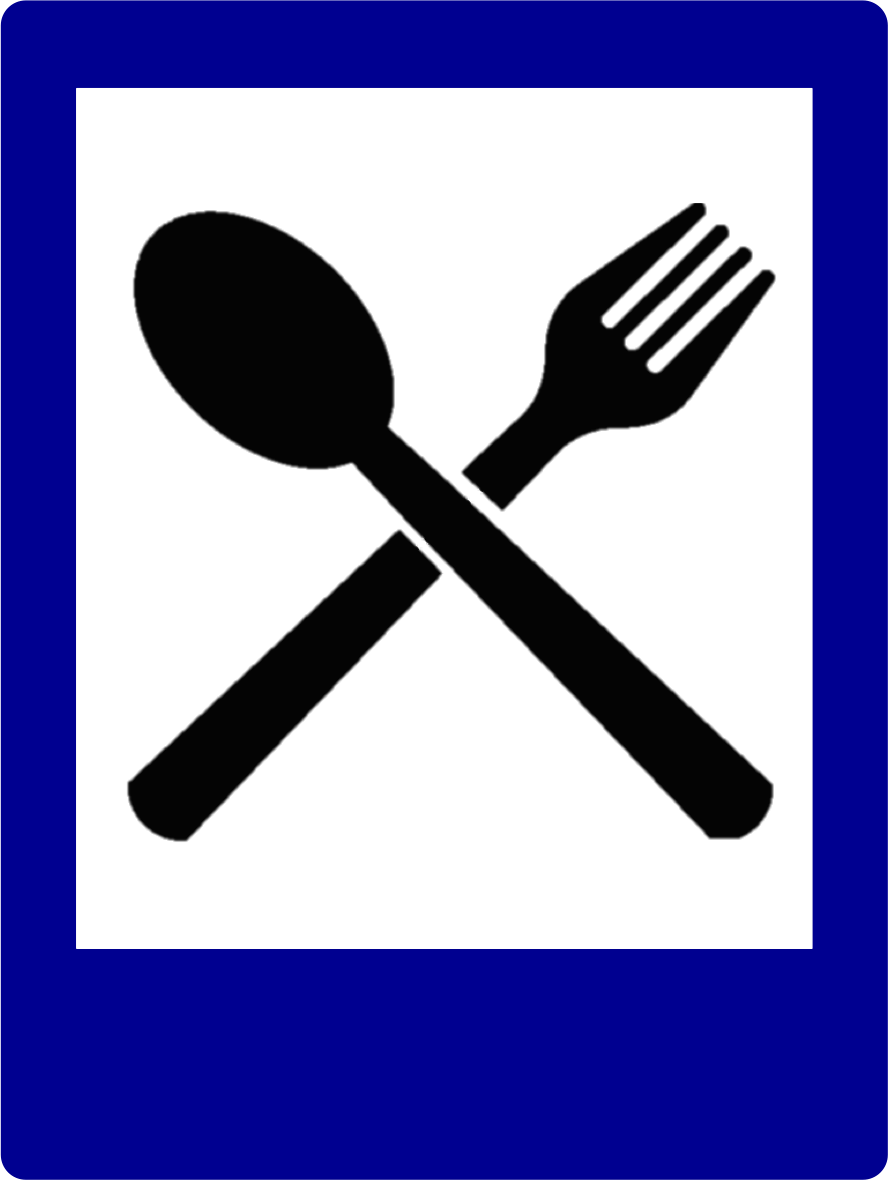
Restaurant

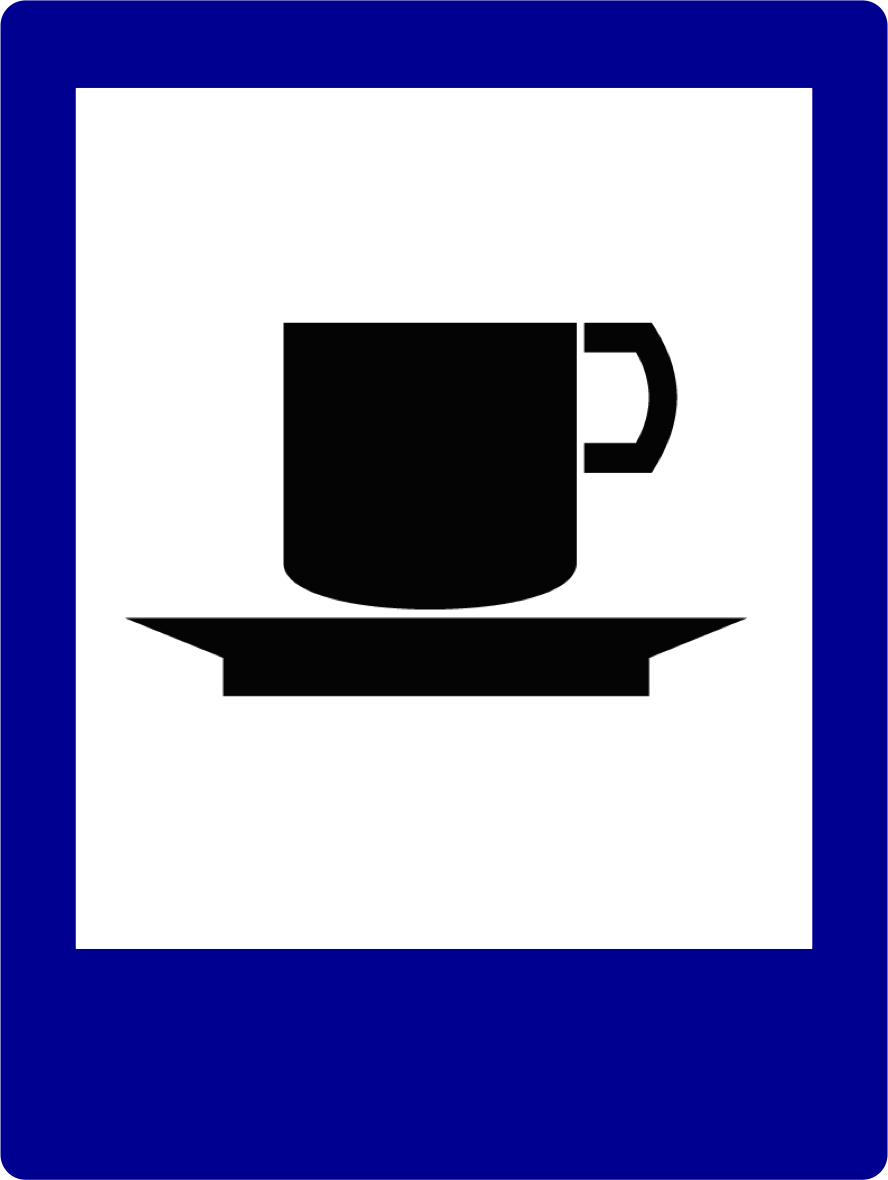
Cafe

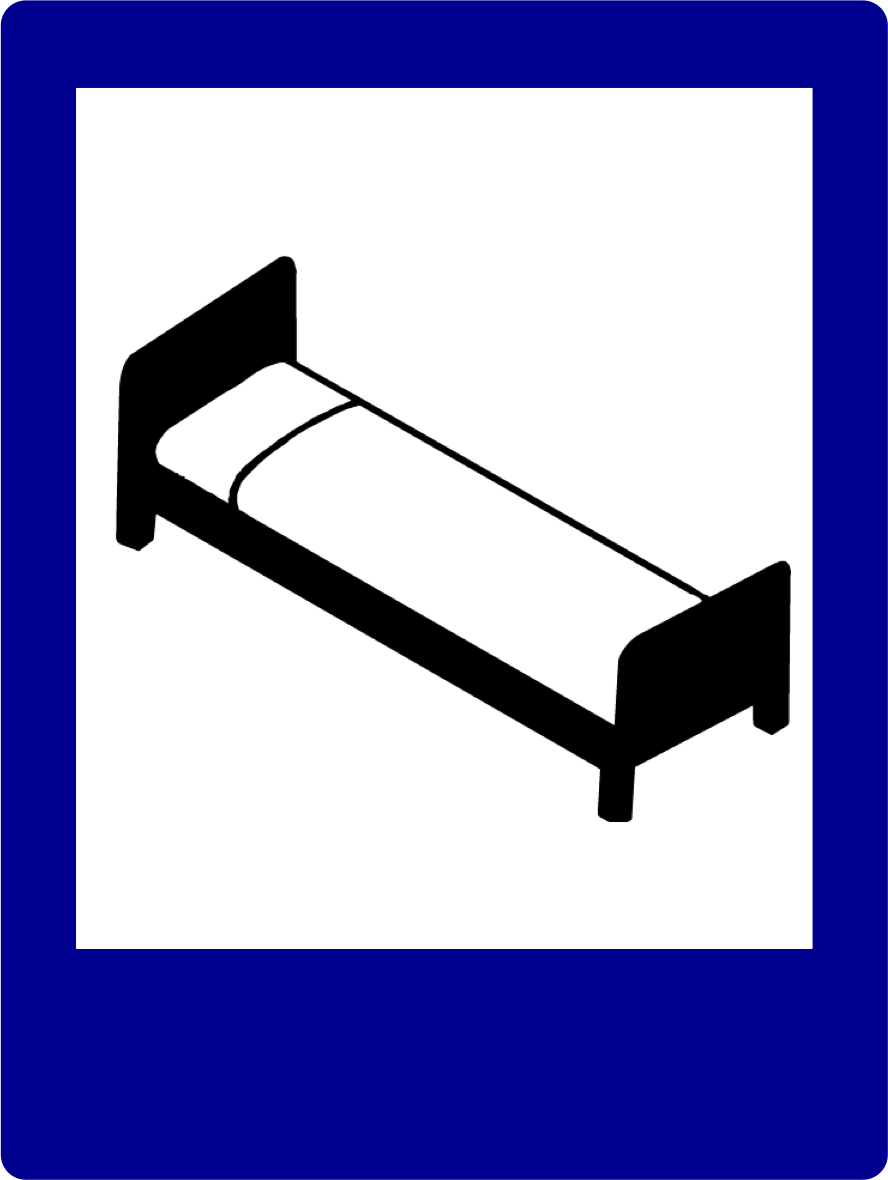
Hotel

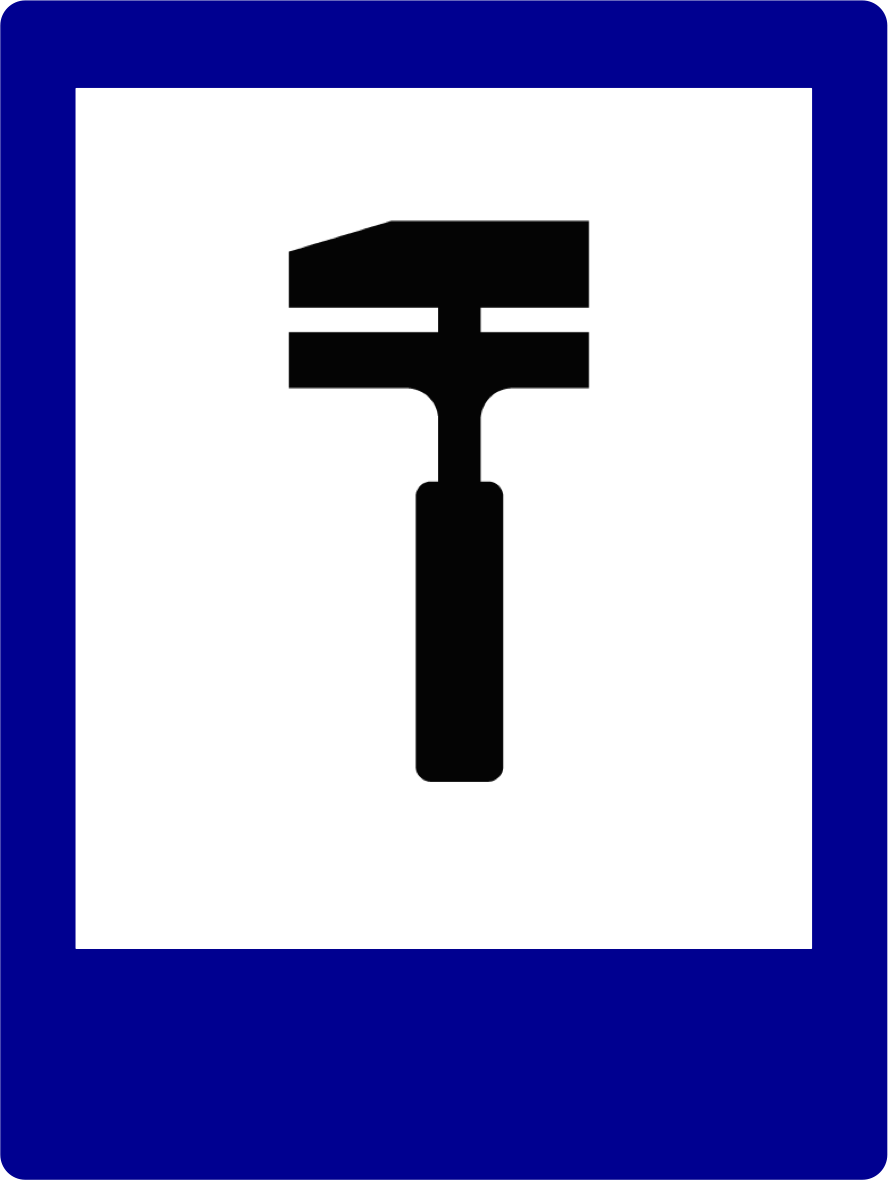
Motor services

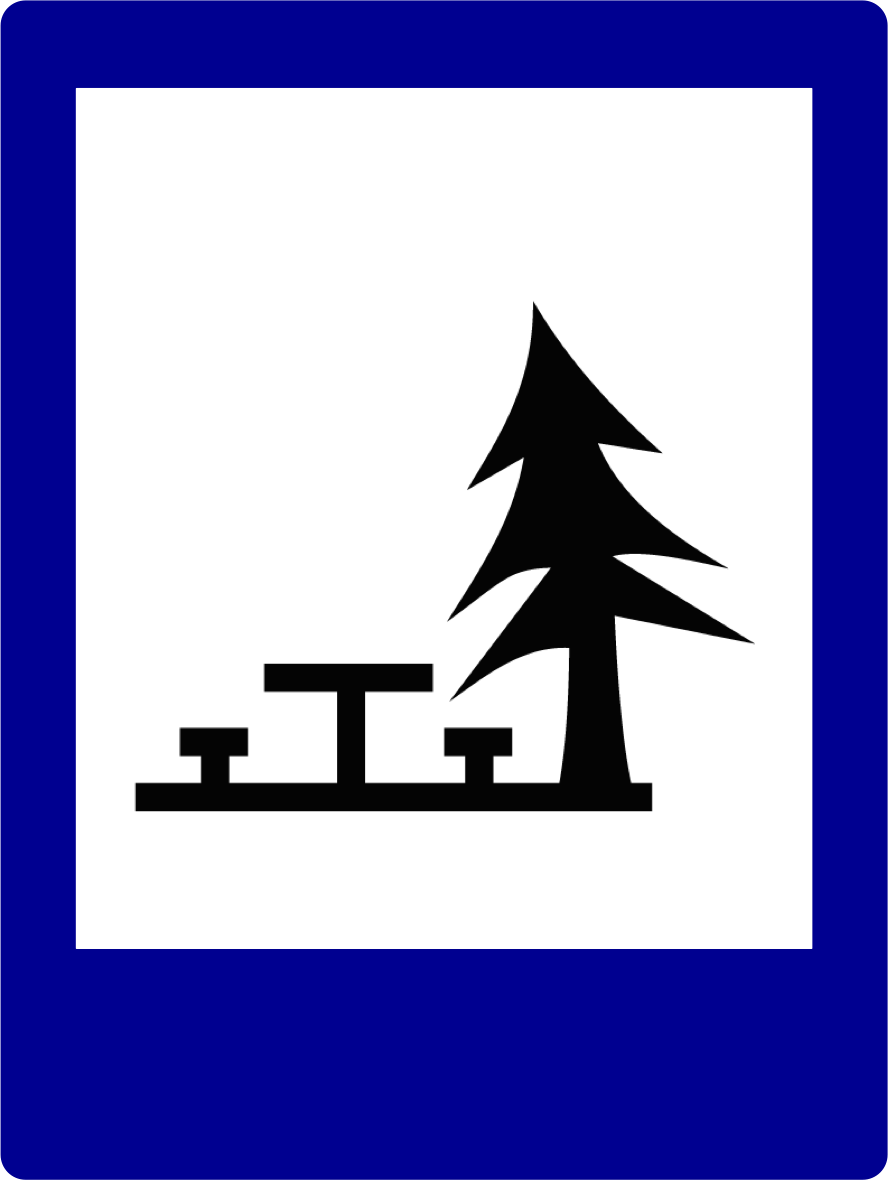
Park

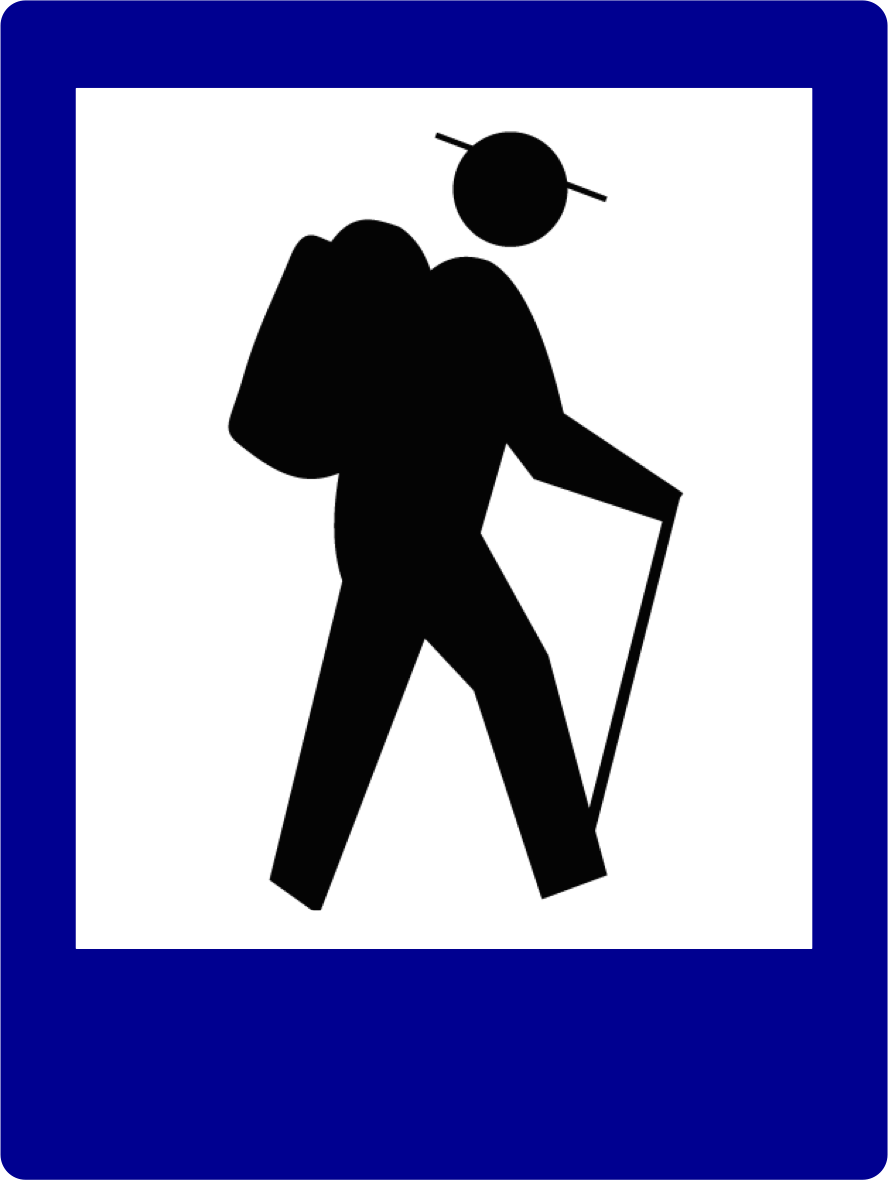
Nature Exploration Route

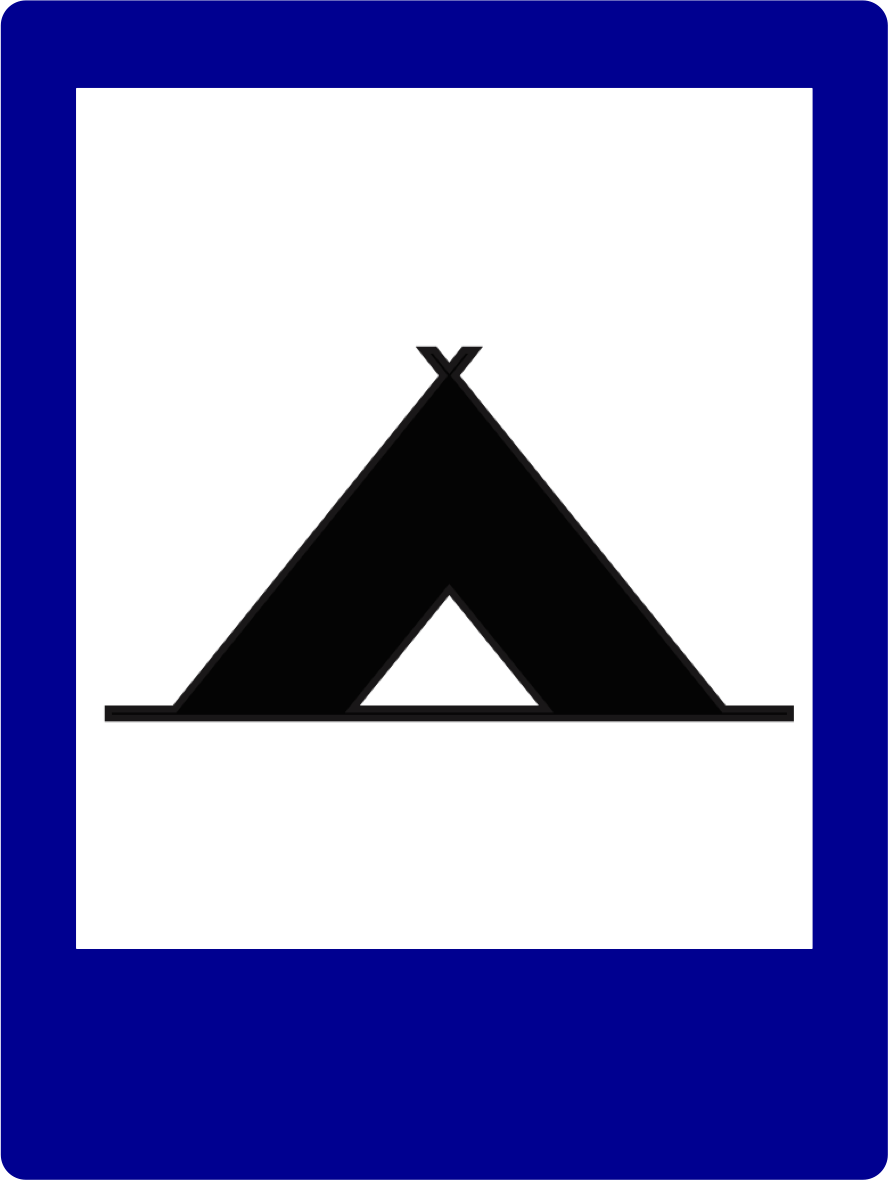
Tent camp

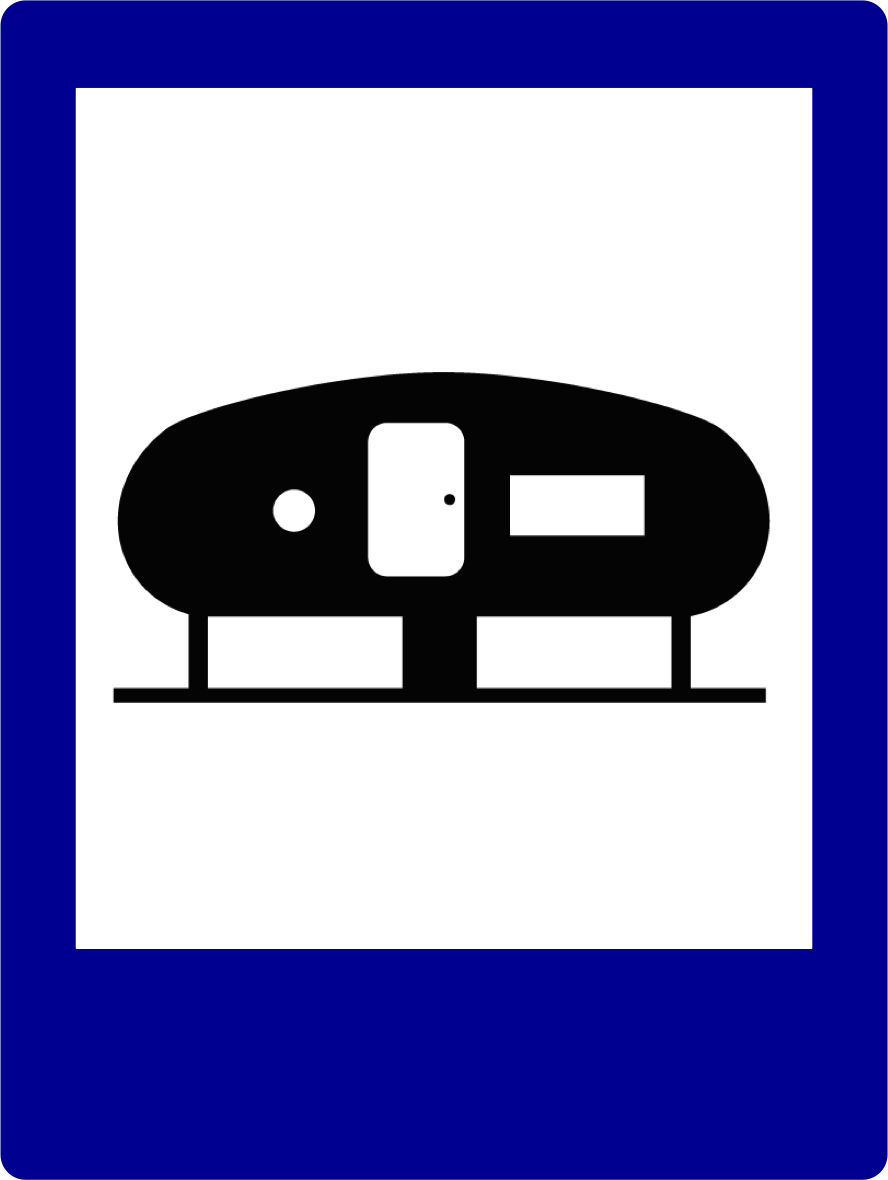
Caravan camp

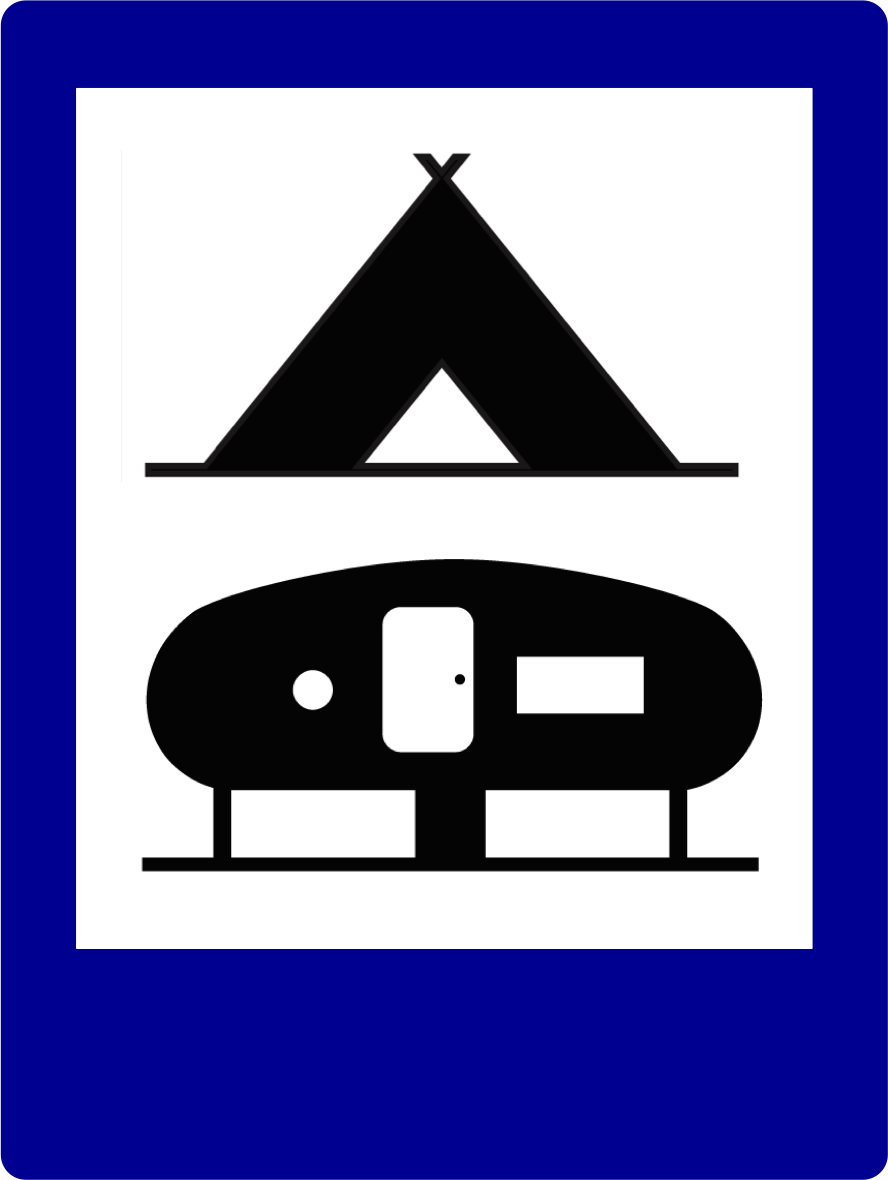
Camp

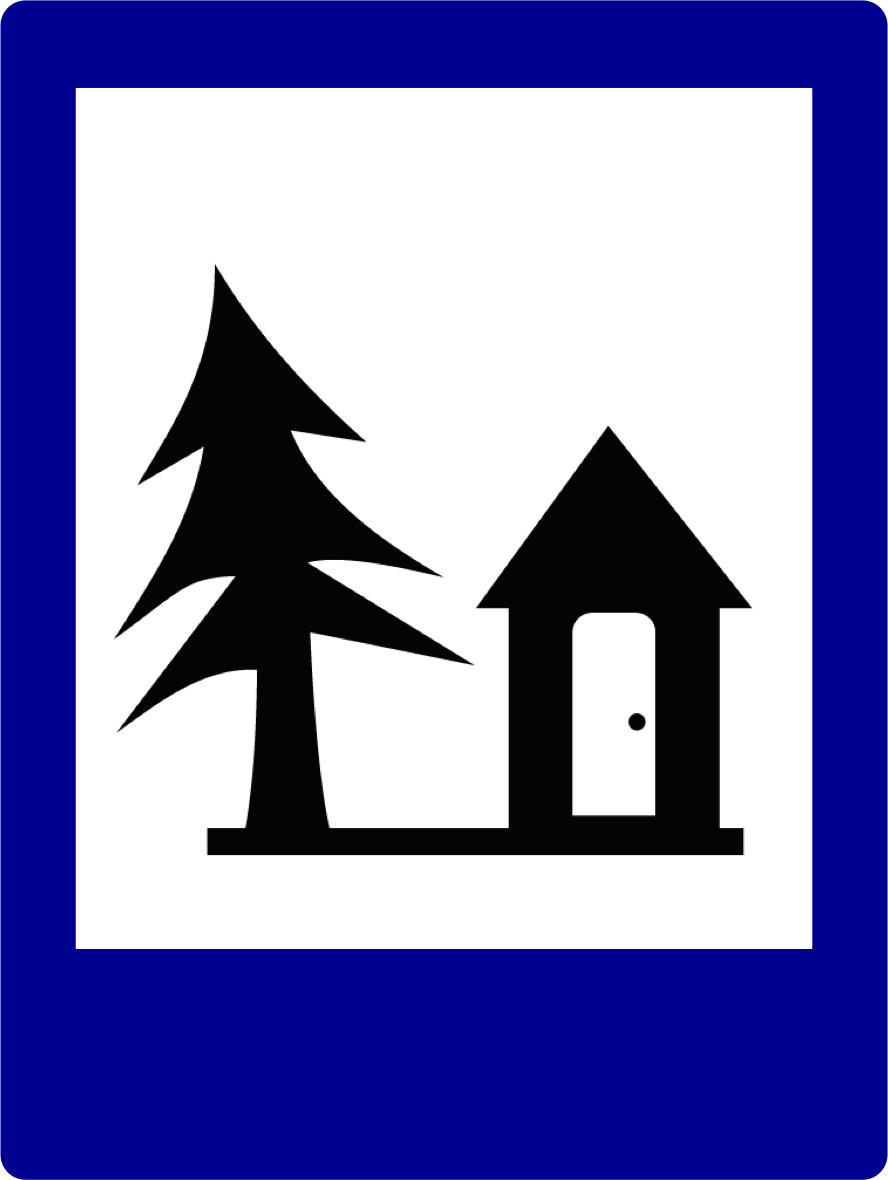
Villa

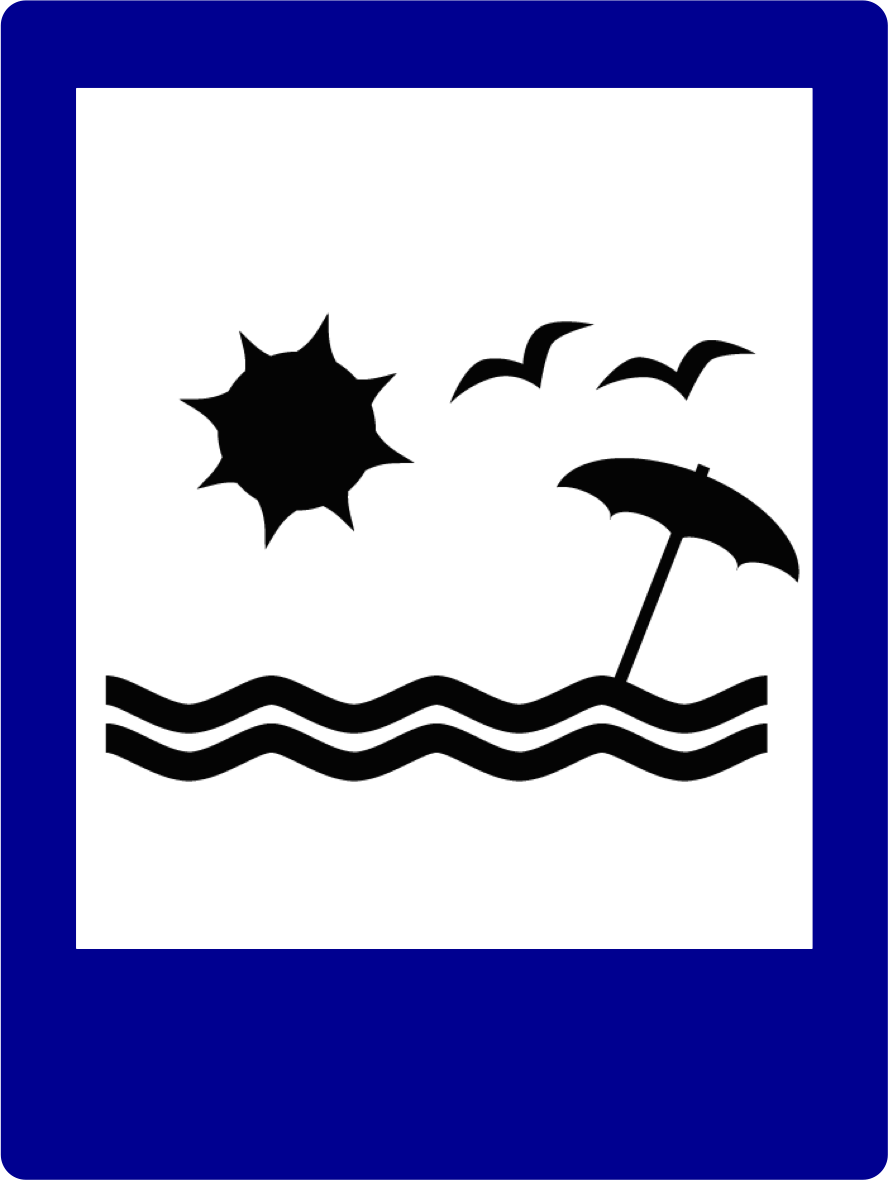
Beach

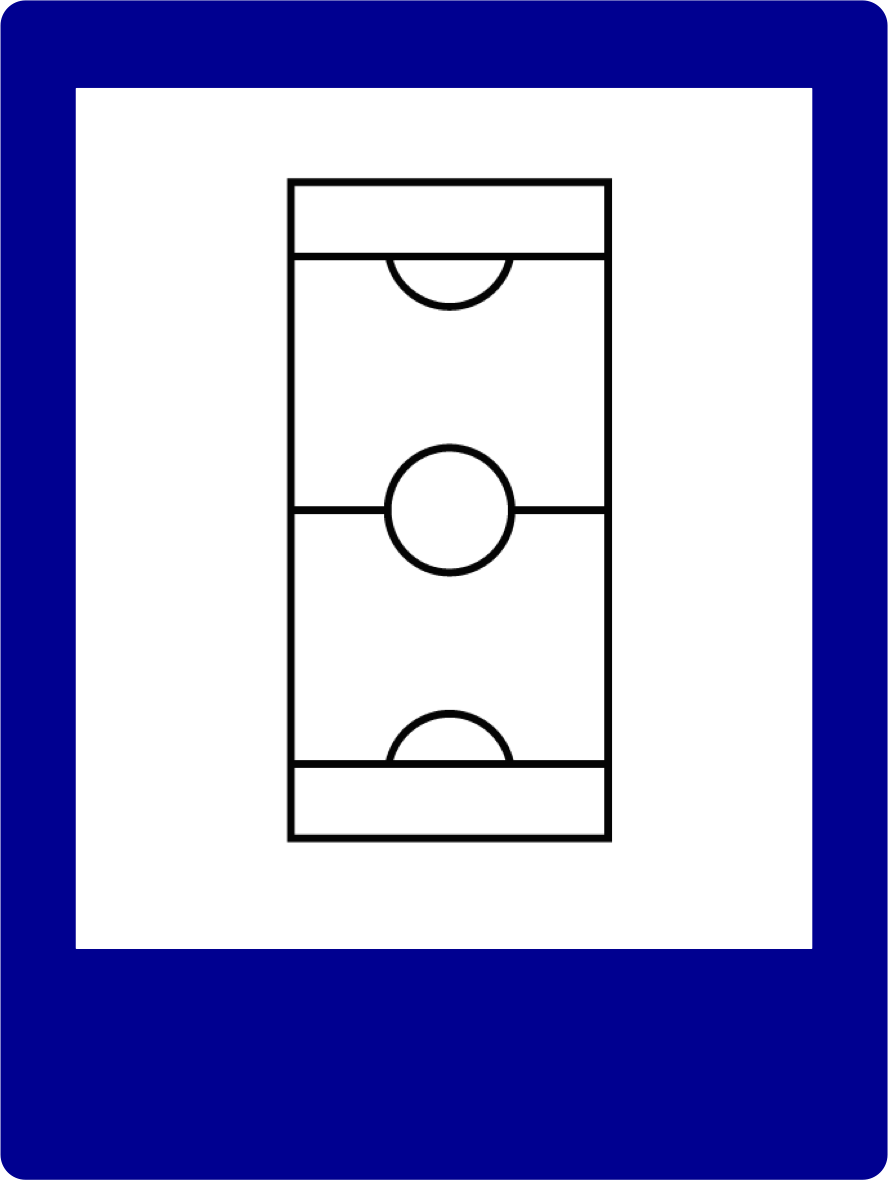
Open sports field

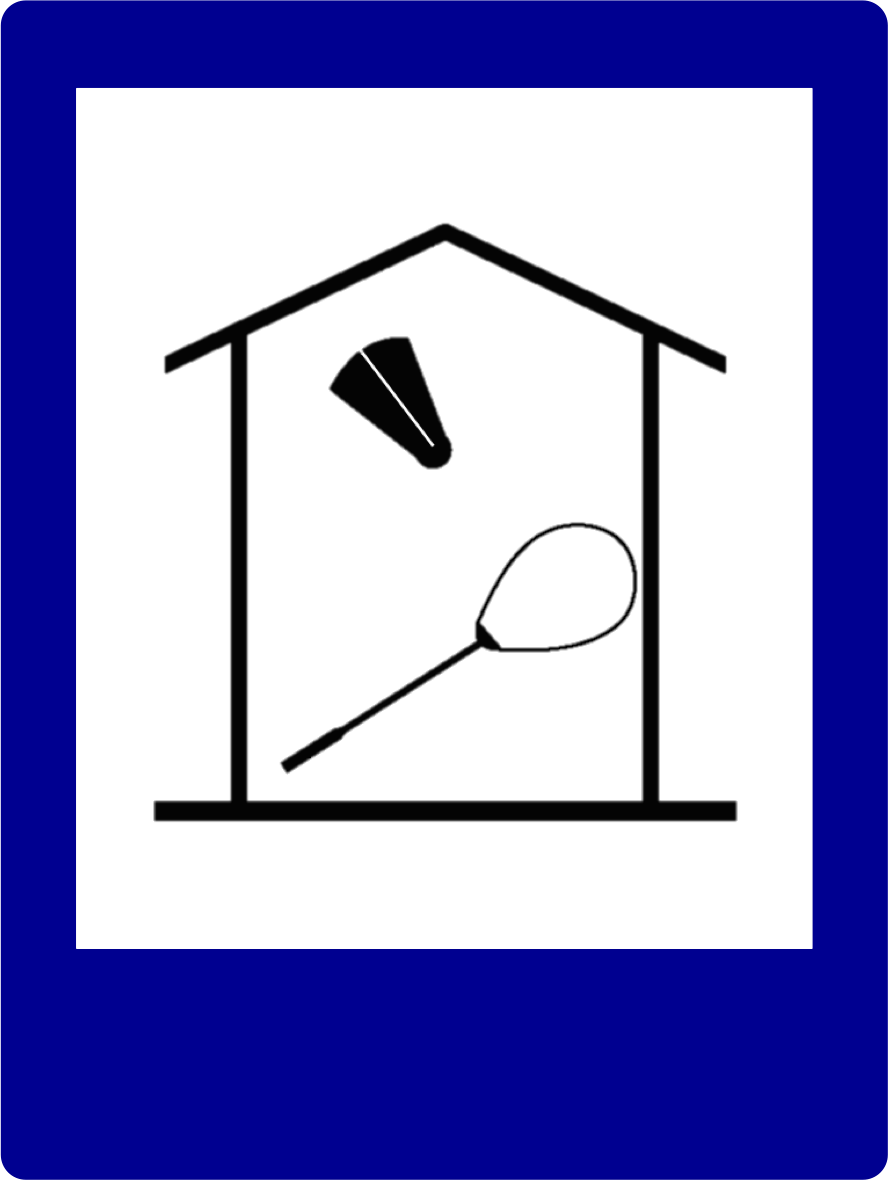
Indoor sports centre

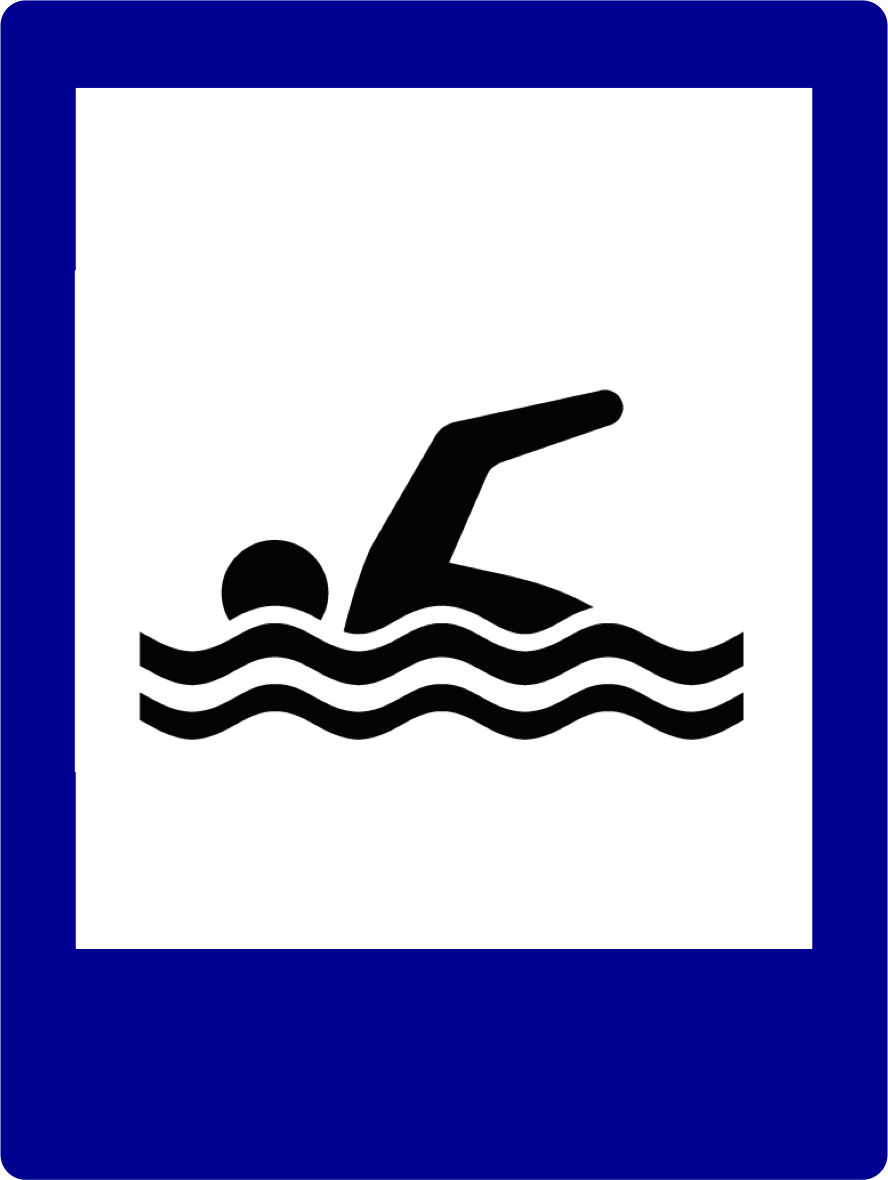
Swimming pool

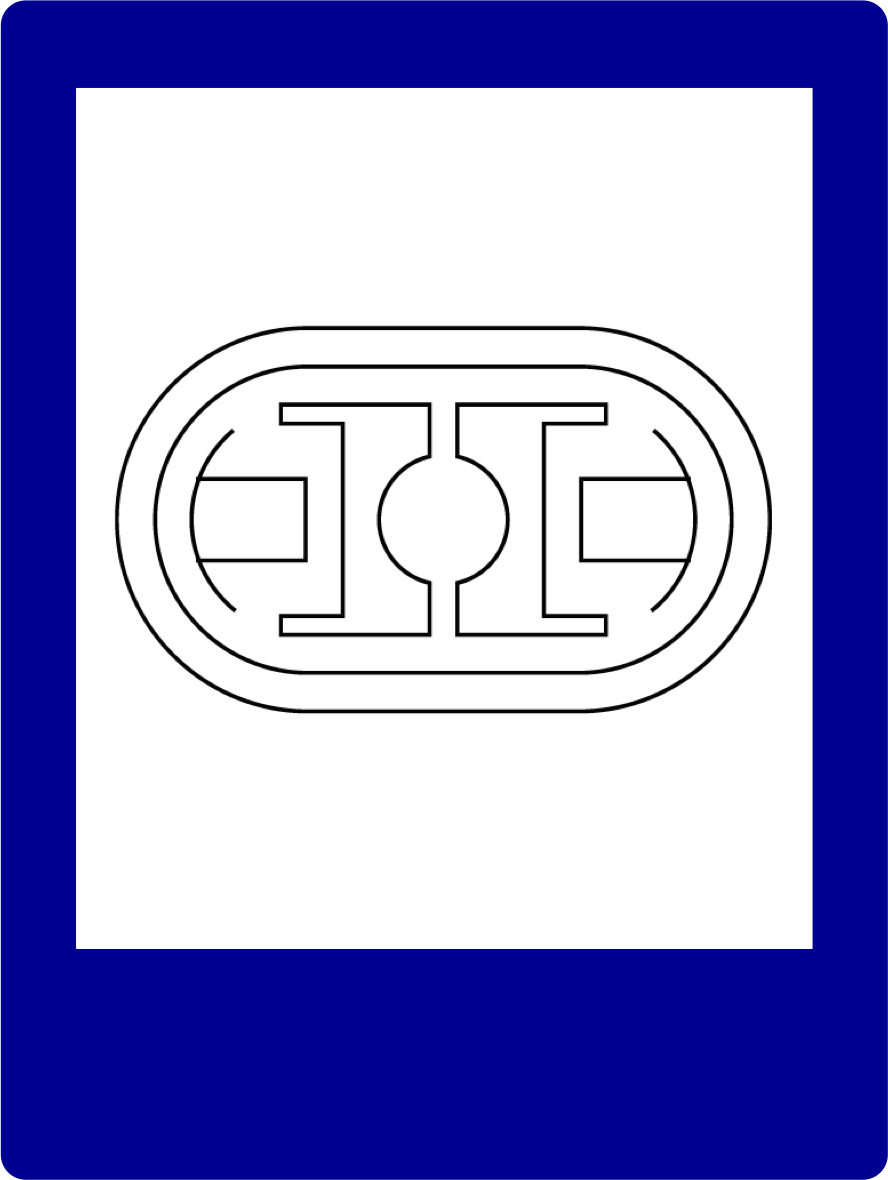
Stadium

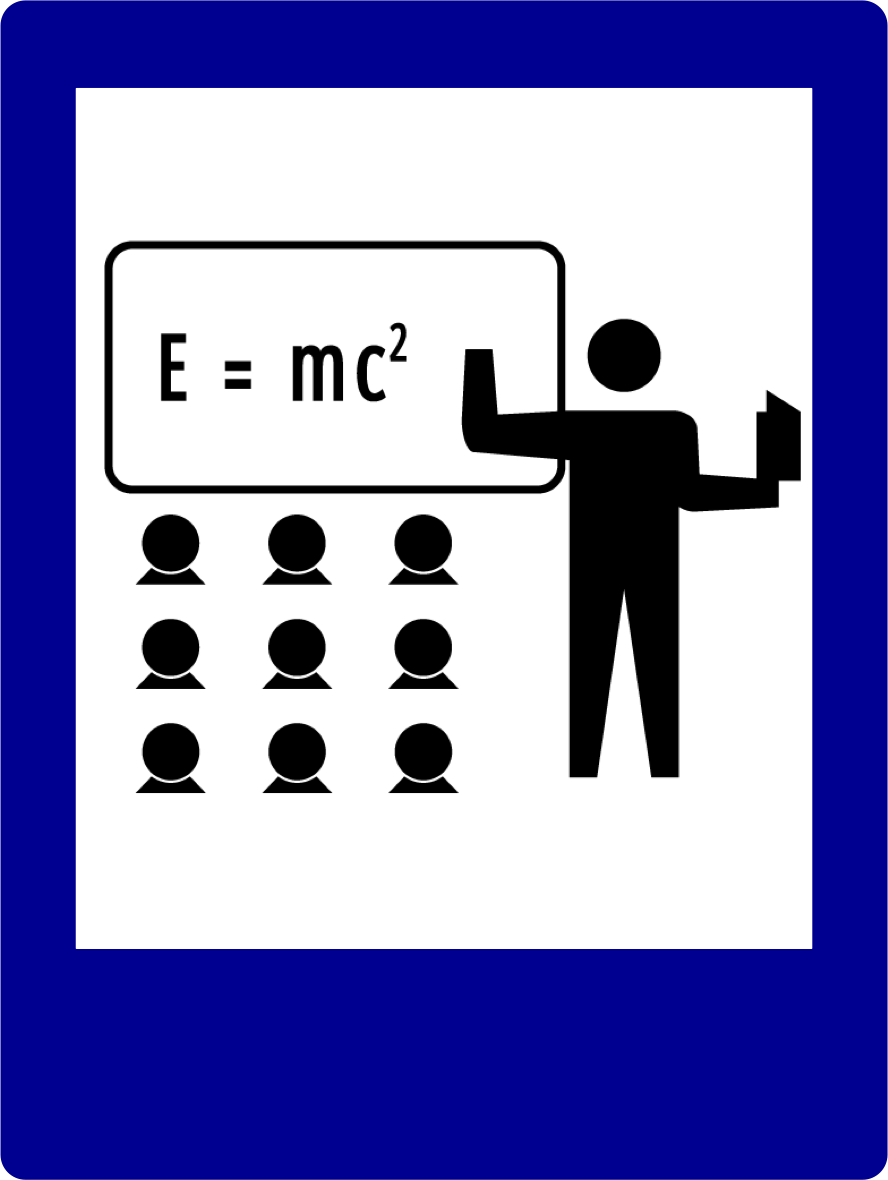
School

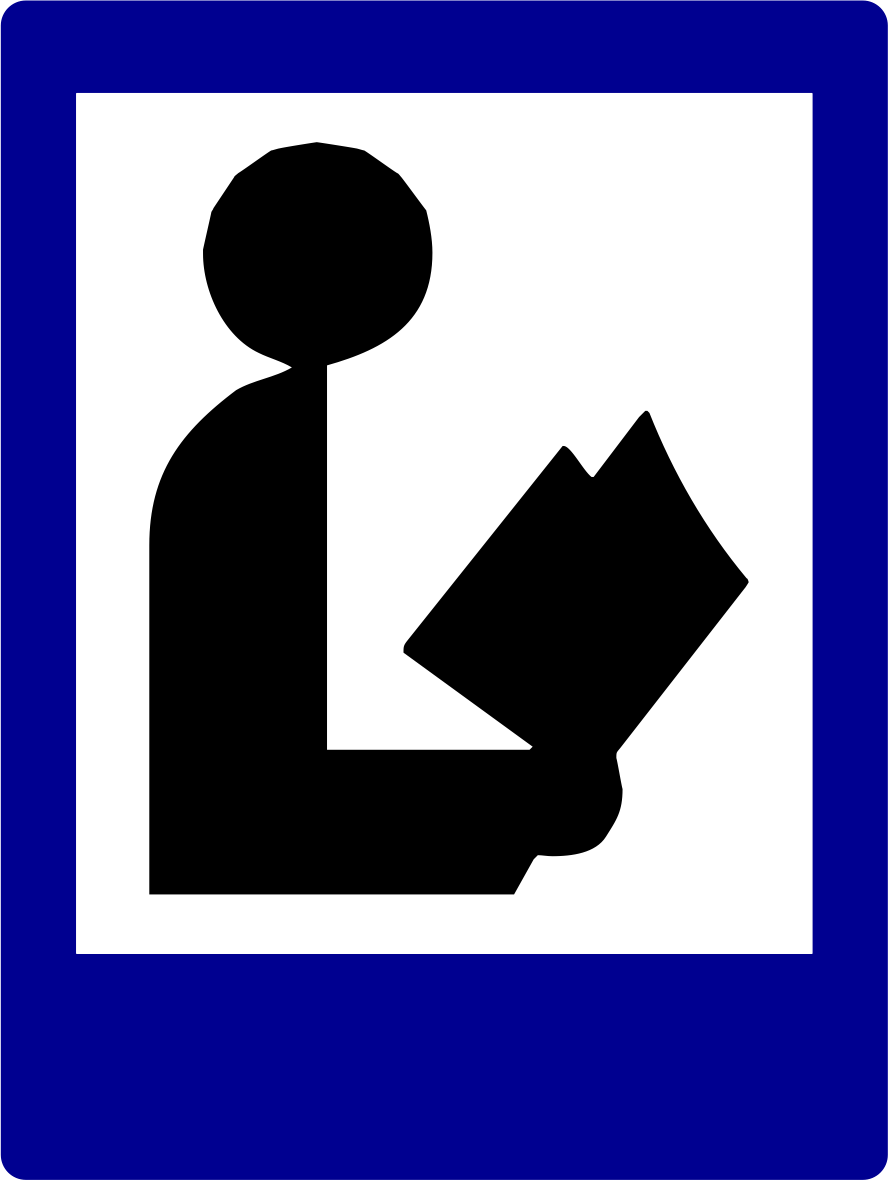
Library

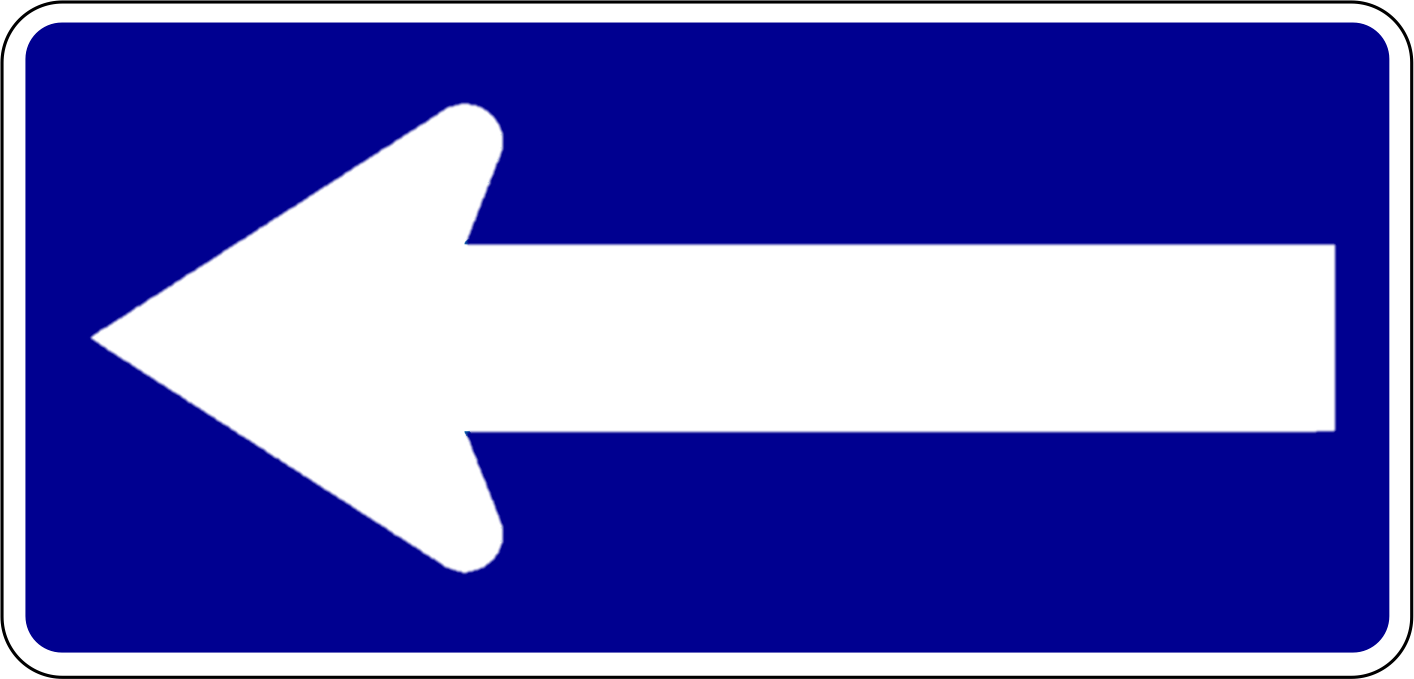
One way traffic

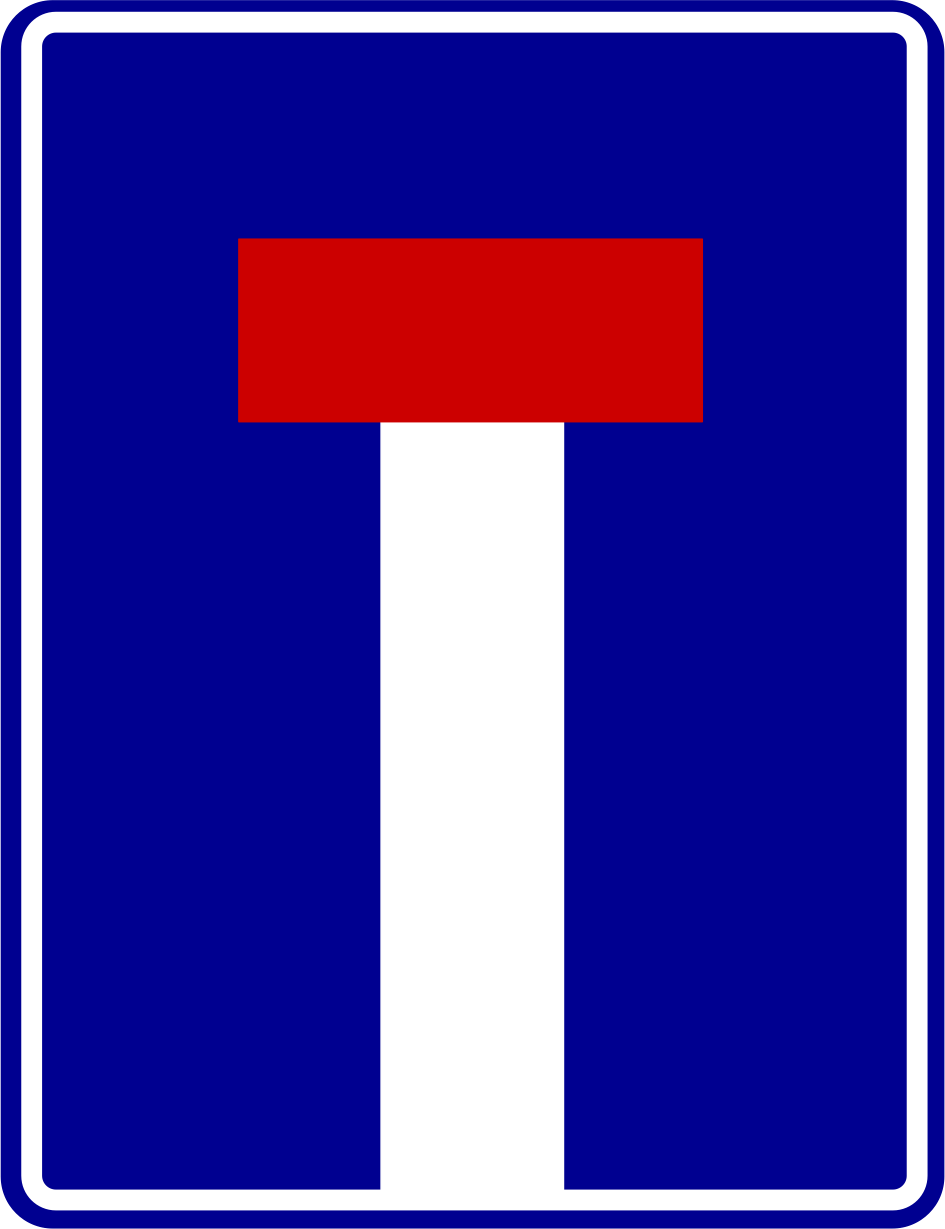
Dead end traffic

Priority over oncoming traffic

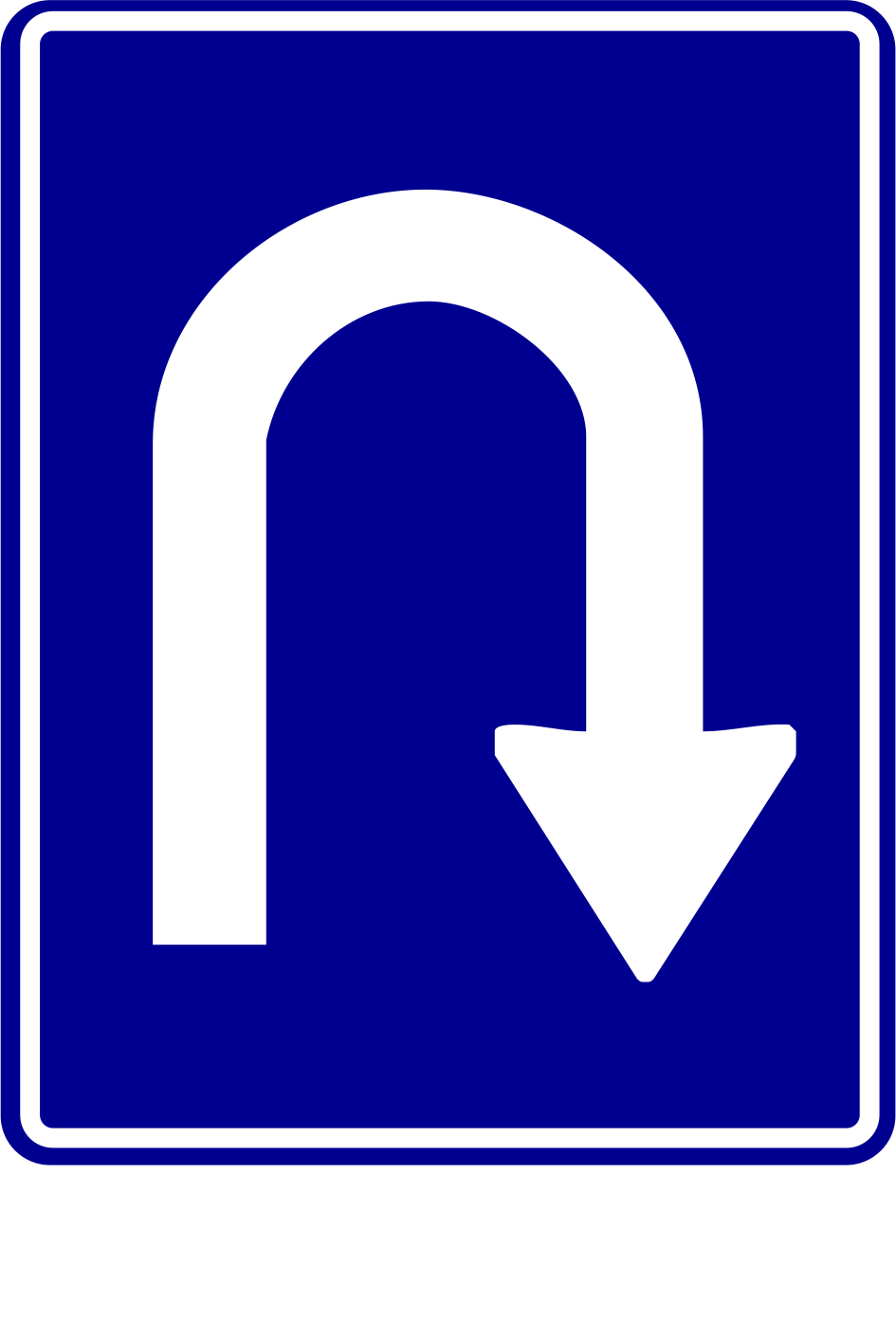
U-turn traffic

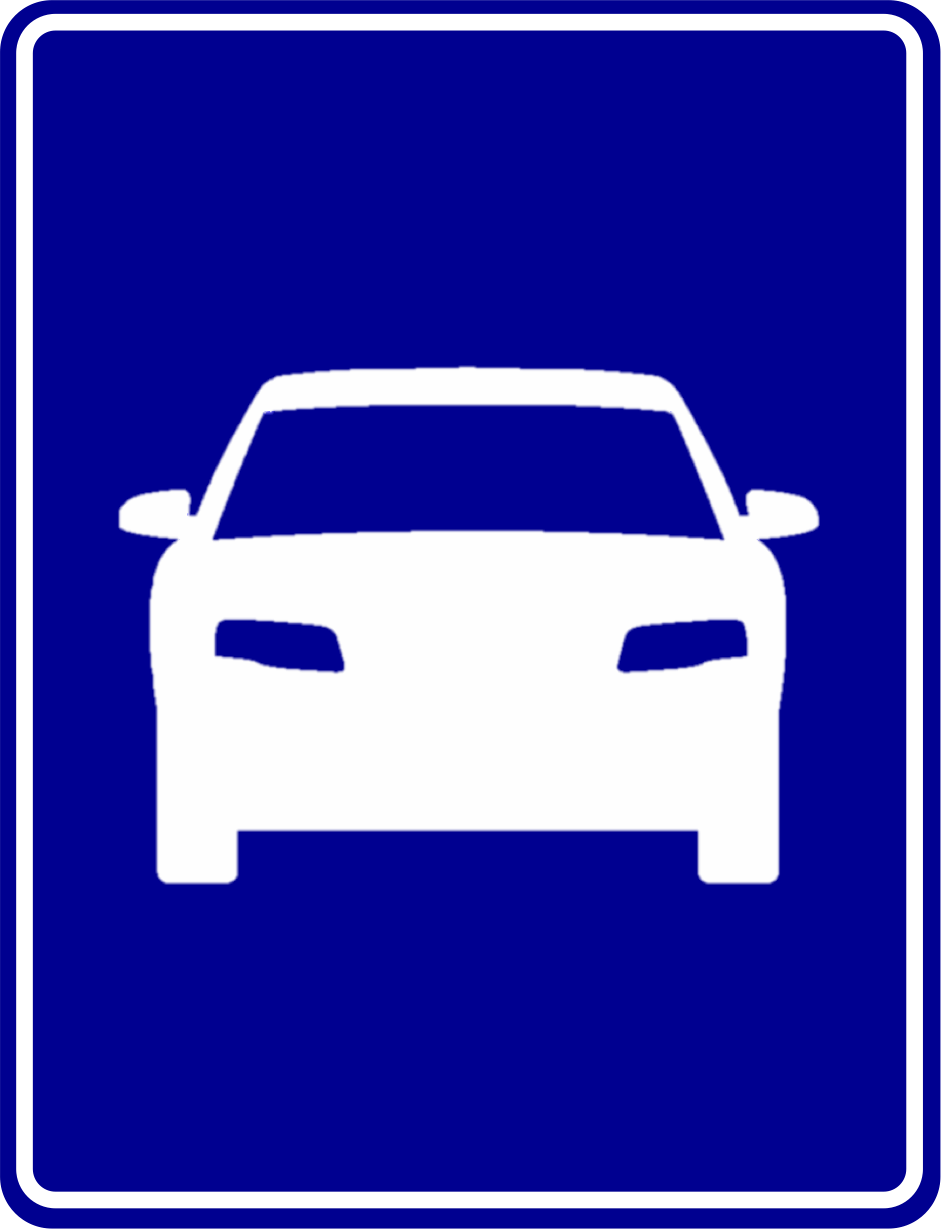
Non toll road

== Temporary signs ==
Temporary signs generally follow New Zealand designs, albeit with the Clearview typeface instead of the Highway Gothic typeface.

Bend

Bend

Surface narrows

Surface widens

Surface narrows on left

Surface narrows on right

Surface widens on left

Surface widens on right

Lane ends on left

Lane ends on right

Added lane on left

Added lane on right

Narrow bridge

Slippery road

Dangerous shoulder

Loose gravel

Diversion to the right

Diversion to the left

Diversion to the right ends

Diversion to the left ends

Roadway splits

Roads merge

Divided road (two-way)

Divided road ends (two-way)

Other danger

Road works

Low clearance

Narrow clearance

Two-way traffic

Flagger

Worded warning sign (in this case "Road Work")

== Retired signs ==
=== 1993 road signs ===
==== Warning signs ====
Bend

Bend

Sharp bend

Sharp bend

Double sharp bend

Double sharp bend

Series of bends

Series of bends

Chevron marker

Chevron marker

Steep descent

Hazardous descent

Steep climb

Hazardous climb

Surface narrows

Surface narrows on left

Surface narrows on right

Narrow bridge

Lane ends on left

Lane ends on right

Drawbridge

Open water

Uneven road

Speed bump

Dip

Slippery road

Loose gravel

Falling rocks

Falling rocks

Pedestrian crossing

Children crossing

Bicycle crossing

Cattle crossing

Wild animal crossing

Road works

Traffic signals

Low flying aircraft

Crosswinds

Two-way traffic

Divided road

Divided road ends

Rodway splits

Crossroads

Side road to left

Side road to right

Skewed side road to left

Skewed side road to right

Skewed side road to left

Skewed side road to right

T-junction

Y-junction

Staggered side roads

Staggered side roads

Double side roads to right

Double side roads to left

Priority crossroads

Priority side road to left

Priority side road to right

Merging traffic

Merging traffic

Roundabout

Low clearance

Narrow clearance

Railway crossing (with barriers)

Railway crossing (no barriers)

Other danger

Countdown markers

Worded warning sign (in this case "Falling rocks during monsoon weather")

==== Prohibitory signs ====
Stop

Customs

== See also ==
- Permenhub no 13/2014
