= Street signs in Chicago =

Street name signs

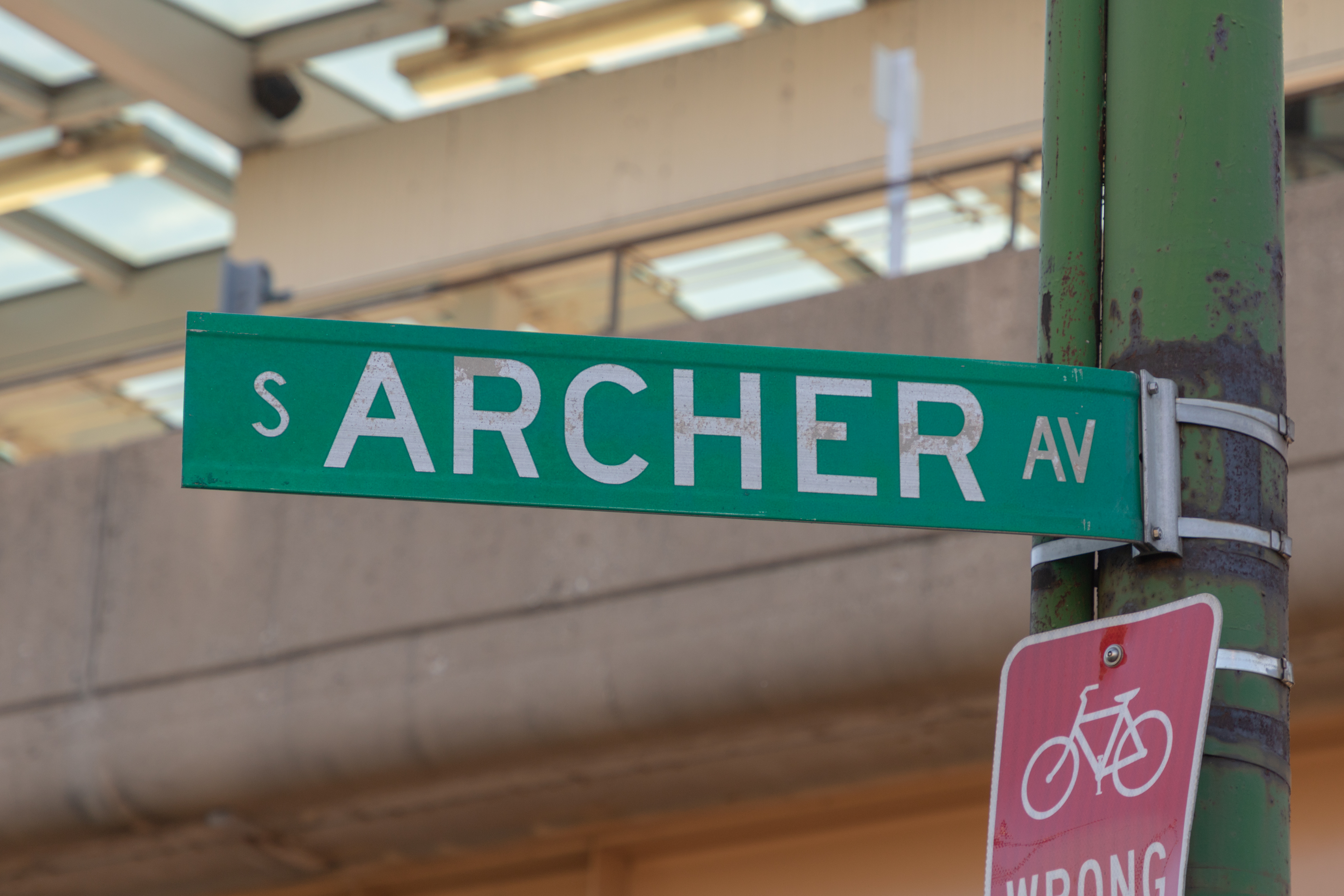
A street sign for Archer Avenue in Chinatown; the sign indicates that this location is south of Madison Street.

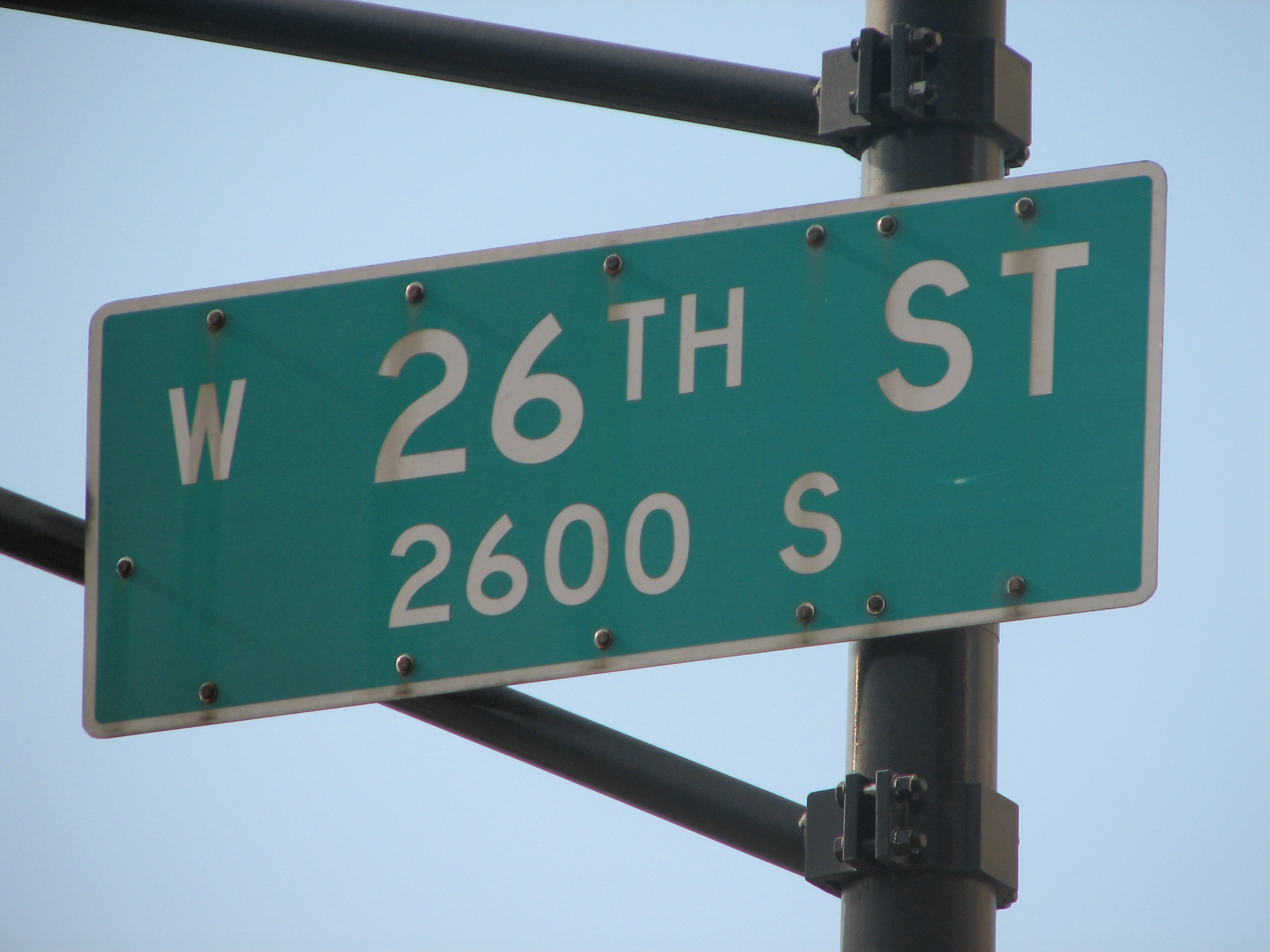
A sign for 26th Street at an intersection with a stoplight. It is much bigger, and includes the street's numerical position – 2600 S – in Chicago's grid.

Street name signs in Chicago are green with white text. They are traditionally written in all capital letters, but newer signs can also be written with lowercase letters. All signs contain not only the name of the street, but also its directional position ("N" and "S" for north-south streets north and south of Madison Street, and "E" and "W" for east-west streets east and west of State Street) and abbreviated suffix ("Dr" for "Drive", "St" for "Street", etc.). Larger signs, located at intersections with stoplights, also include the street's numerical position within Chicago's grid system.

The modern color scheme of street signs in Chicago dates to the 1970s. Before this, street signs had generally been yellow with black text, which was phased out to standardize street signs internationally. The Chicago City Council often ceremonially names stretches of road after notable figures associated with the area. Such honorary names are indicated with signs similar to normal street signs, but brown instead of green and lacking any directional data.

== Historical signs ==
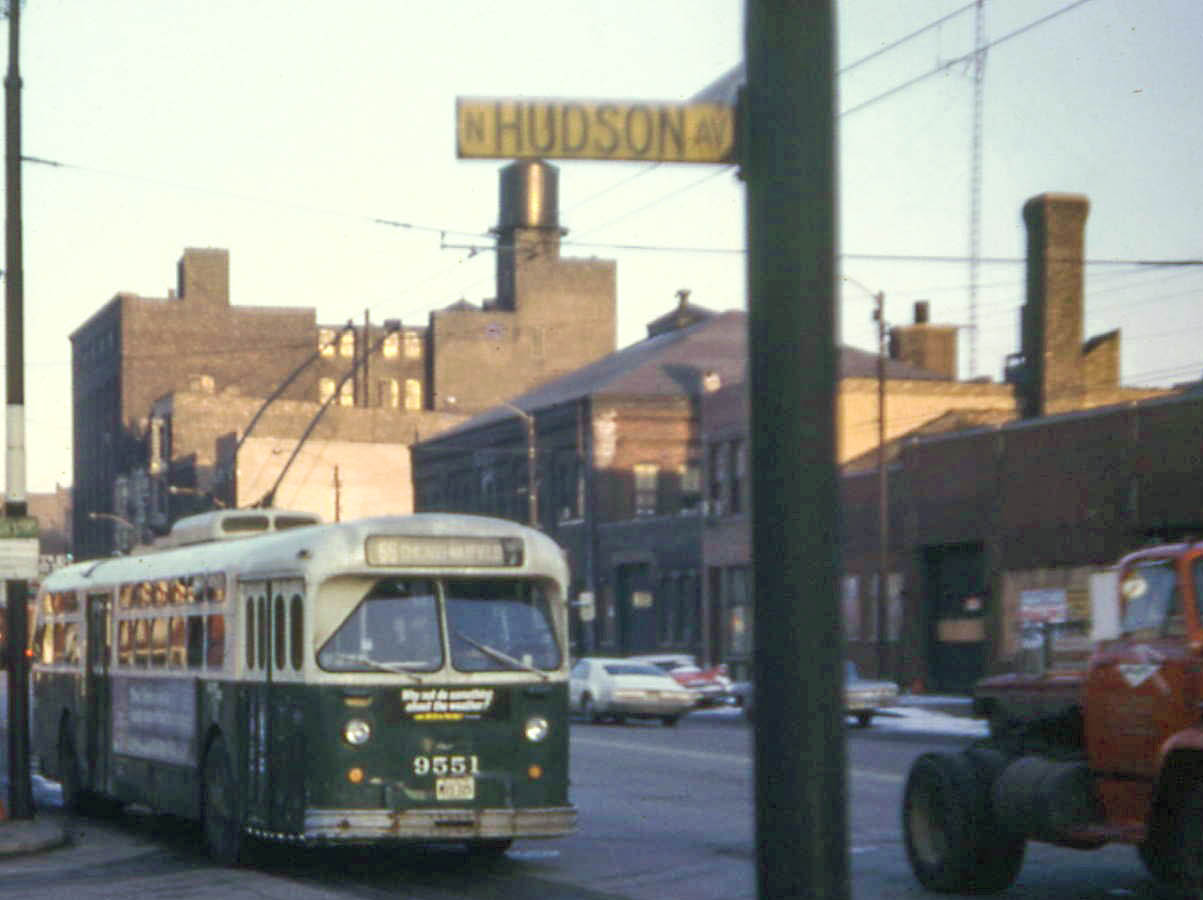
Black-on-yellow street sign displaying "N Hudson Av" at Chicago Avenue, 1967

Prior to the early 20th century, Chicago lacked a unified system for identifying streets. Brown signs with white text were used in the Loop, but in residential neighborhoods street names were painted onto poles or simply left undisclosed. In 1936, a federal grant allowed the city to install 64,000 yellow signs with black text for street names, but most were melted down for their metal in World War II.

After the war, the city tested multiple sign styles in the Loop and ended up with returning to the black-on-yellow color scheme, installing signs starting in 1950. These signs were otherwise identical to modern signs, with directional and suffix information included. However, the federal Manual on Uniform Traffic Control Devices (MUTCD) revised its guidance in 1975 in order to make American street signs more legible by adopting consistent color schemes; it designated white-on-green for guidance signs and restricted yellow-on-black signs to warning purposes. After the revised guidances were in place the city began duly replacing the signs.

By the 2000s, yellow signs had become quite rare in situ, with only a handful of examples remaining in more distant parts of the city. This is in contrast to other cities, where old street signs are a more common sight.

== Modern signs ==
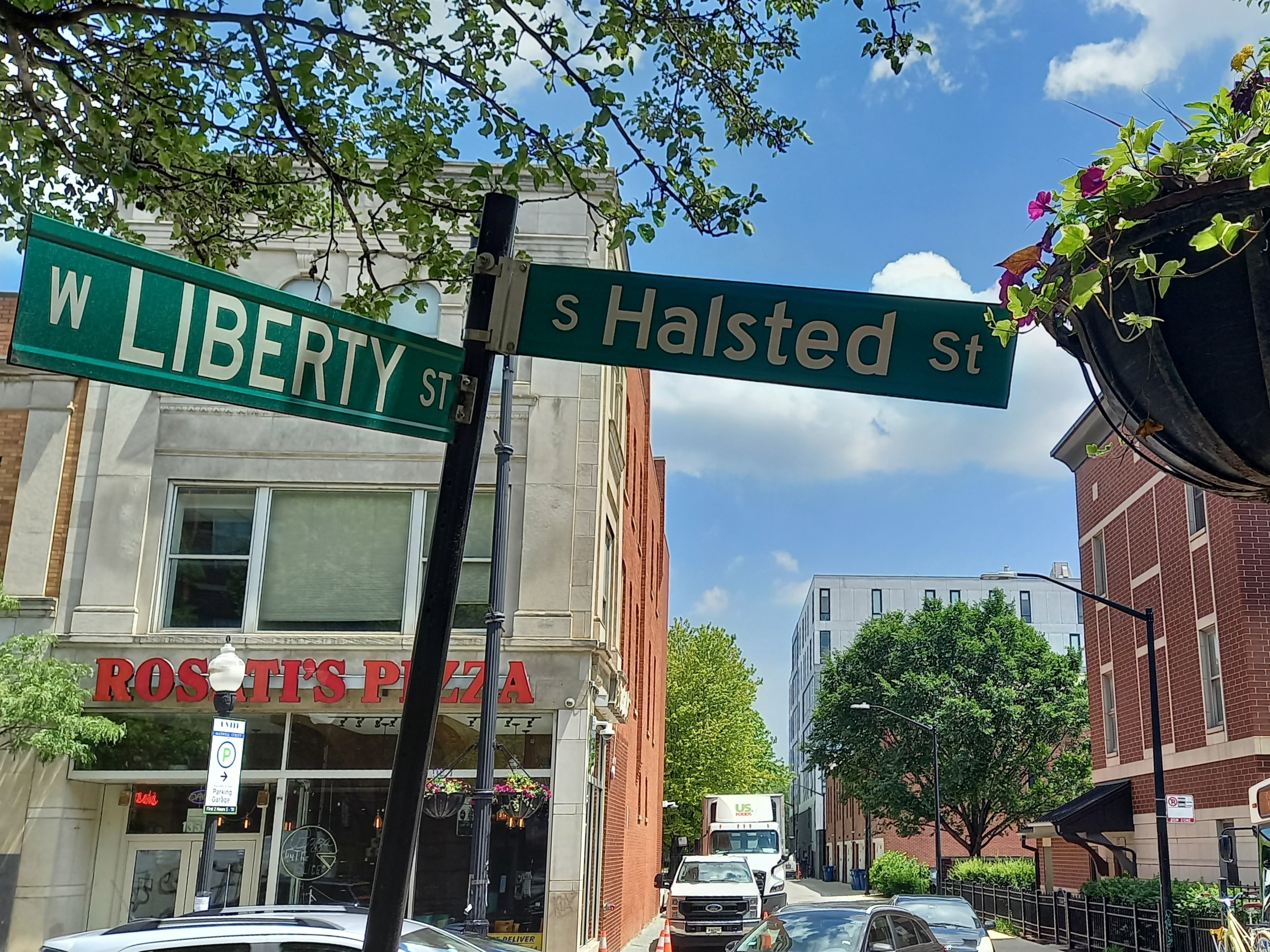
Comparison between a street sign with all-capital letters (Liberty Street) and another with mixed-case letters (Halsted Street)

Modern signs are green with white text. They are usually written in all-capital letters, but MUTCD guidance in 2009 required that mixed-case words be used instead, as they are easier to read.

== Honorary signs ==
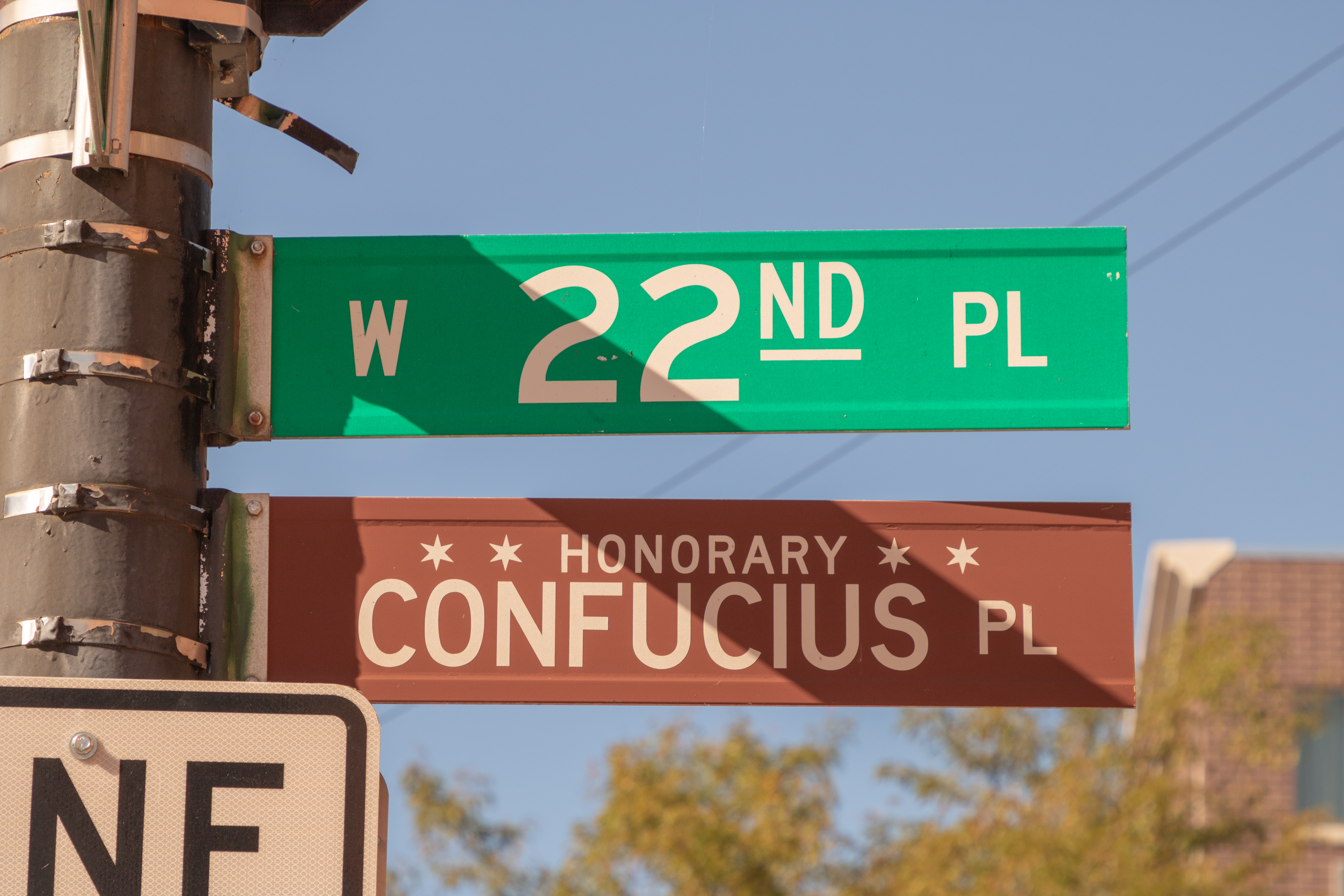
West 22nd Place, honorarily named "Confucius Place", in Chinatown.

In 1981, Mike Royko attempted to rename a stretch of Evergreen Avenue in honor of Nelson Algren, who had long lived on the street. Although mayor Jane Byrne received the proposal favorably and even put up signs, local backlash forced the City Council to formally veto the proposal. To avoid repeating the incident, it was decided to start naming such streets honorarily rather than impact any addresses. Such honorary streets have special signs that are brown, have the word "Honorary" at the top surrounded by the Chicago stars, and lack any directional information.

== See also ==
- Street signs in New York City

== Works cited ==
Schmidt, John R. (2021). "The Short, Unhappy Life of Algren Street". Unknown Chicago Tales. Charleston, South Carolina: The History Press. ISBN 9781467147521.
