= Street signs in New York City =

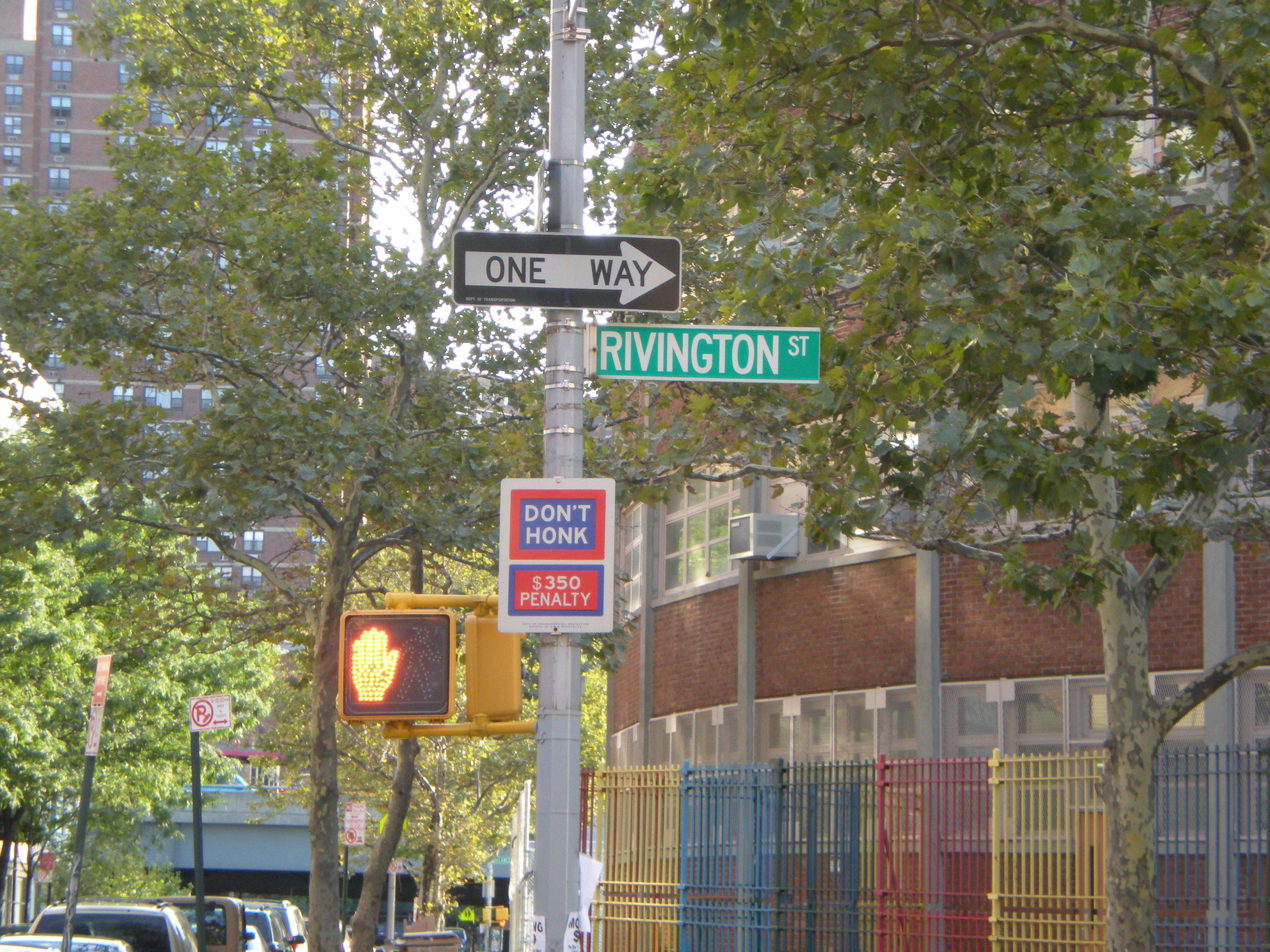
A street sign for Rivington Street in Manhattan, with a One Way sign above it

There are many types of street name signs in New York City. The standard format is a green sign in all-capital letters, with the suffix abbreviated and in superscript. Many signs deviate from the Manual on Uniform Traffic Control Devices standards, especially in historic districts and in Midtown Manhattan and the Financial District.

== Manhattan and the Bronx ==
Street labels were historically placed on the sides of buildings. The "Guggenheimer Ordinance", passed by the Municipal Assembly in 1901, required owners of properties on street corners to label their respective streets with five-inch (130 mm) letters on a blue background; this proved unpopular with such owners.

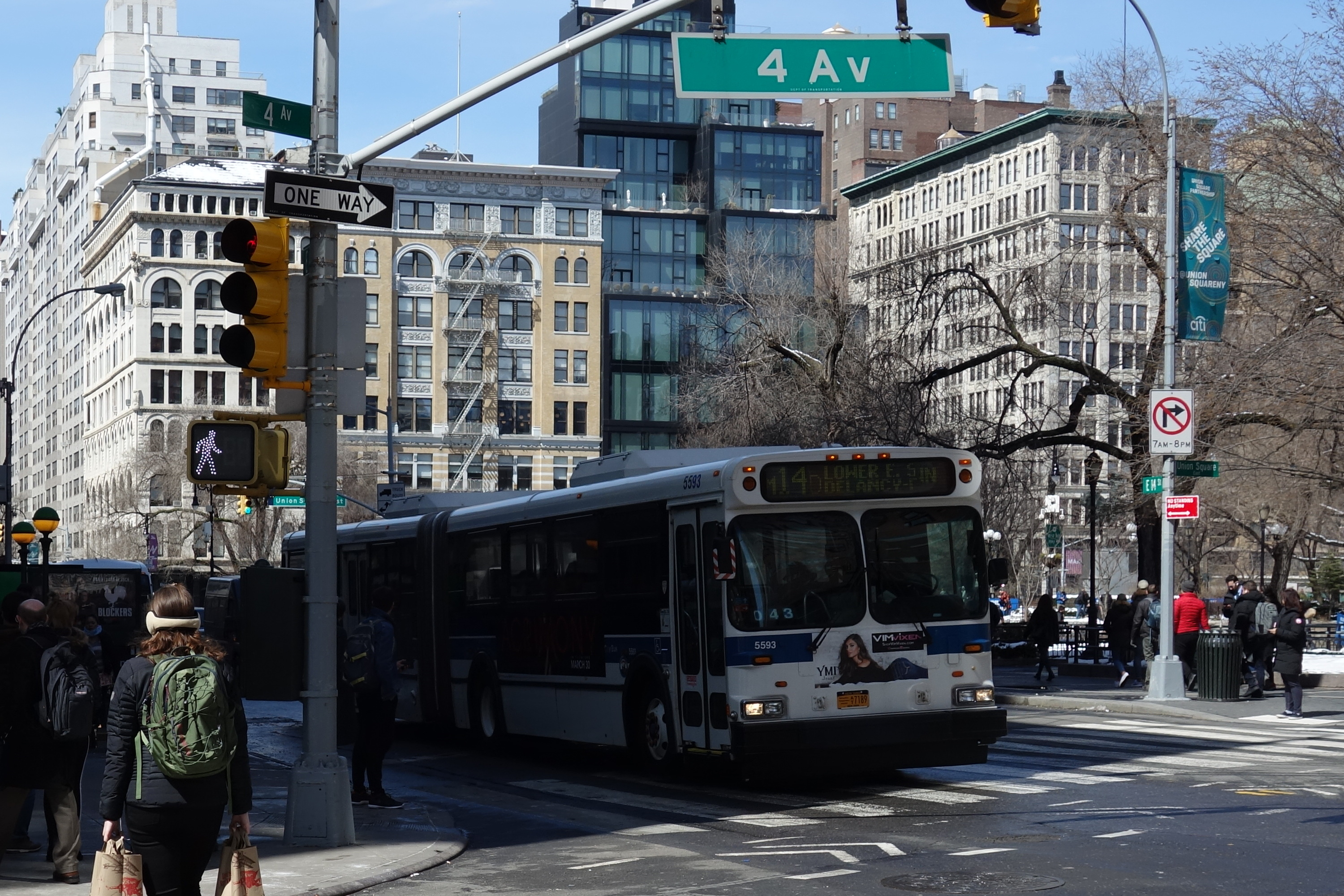
A street sign hanging from a stoplight, in this case for Fourth Avenue by Union Square.

Pole-mounted street signs were installed beginning in the 1910s. In Manhattan and the Bronx, these took the form of dark blue "humpback signs" with white all-capital serifed text. The hump on the signs indicated the cross street with smaller letters; for example, if one were on Broadway and looking at the street sign for the intersection with 4th Street, the main portion of the sign would say "4th St." and the hump would say "Broadway". These signs continued to be used until the 1960s.

Beginning in the 1960s and ending in the early-1980s signs in Manhattan were typically yellow with black text. Signs in the Bronx were typically blue with white text during the same period.

== Queens ==
Signs in Queens were typically white with blue text in the 1960s and the 1970s; for the filming of Men In Black III, such signs were recreated for period correctness.

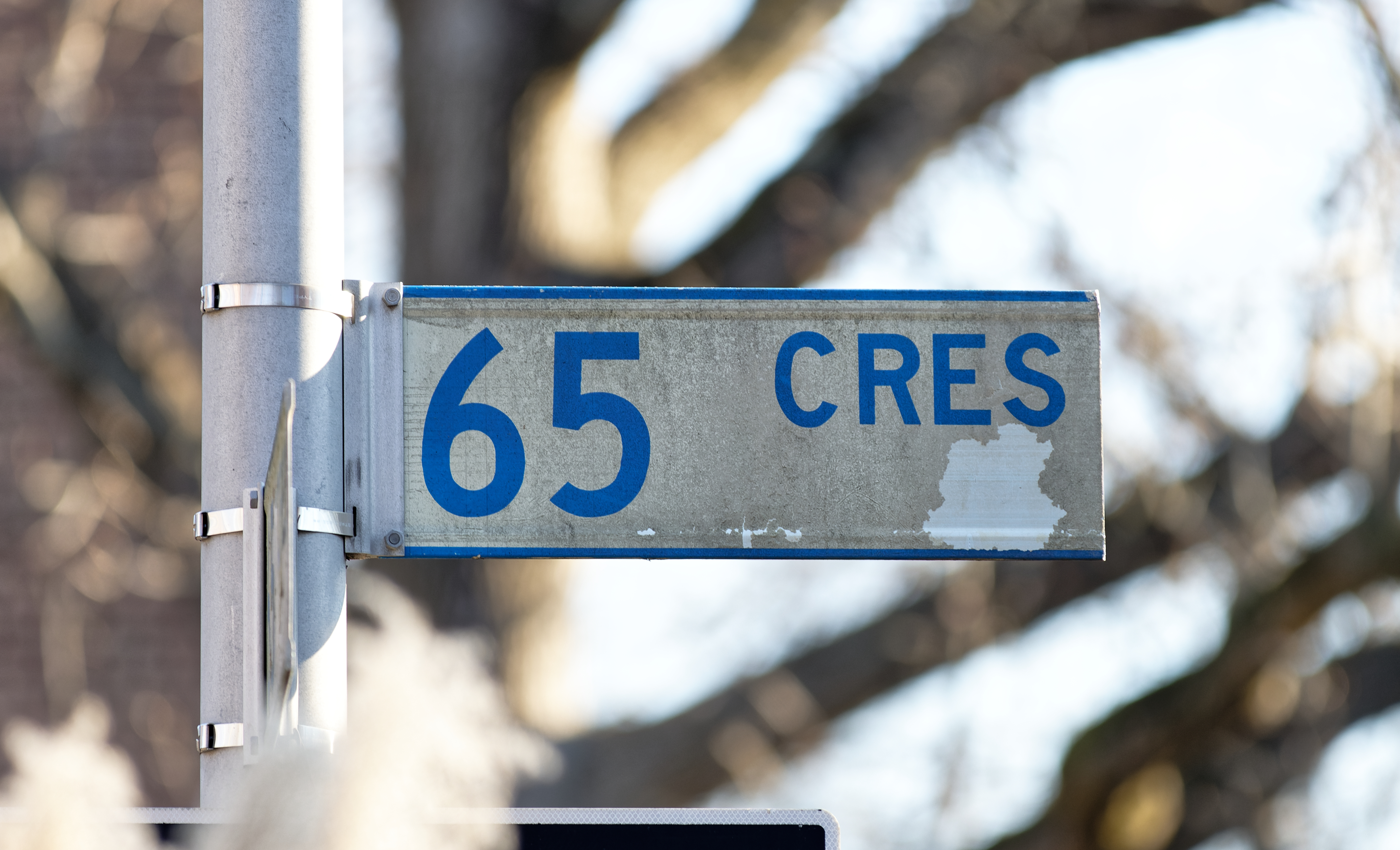
65th Crescent sign, Queens (circa 1960s–70s), pictured in 2024

== Brooklyn ==
Signs in Brooklyn were typically black with white text in the 1960s and 1970s.

== Staten Island ==
Like those in Manhattan, signs on Staten Island were typically yellow with black text during the 1960s and 1970s.

== See also ==
- Street signs in Chicago
