= Street name sign =

Type of traffic sign used to identify named roads

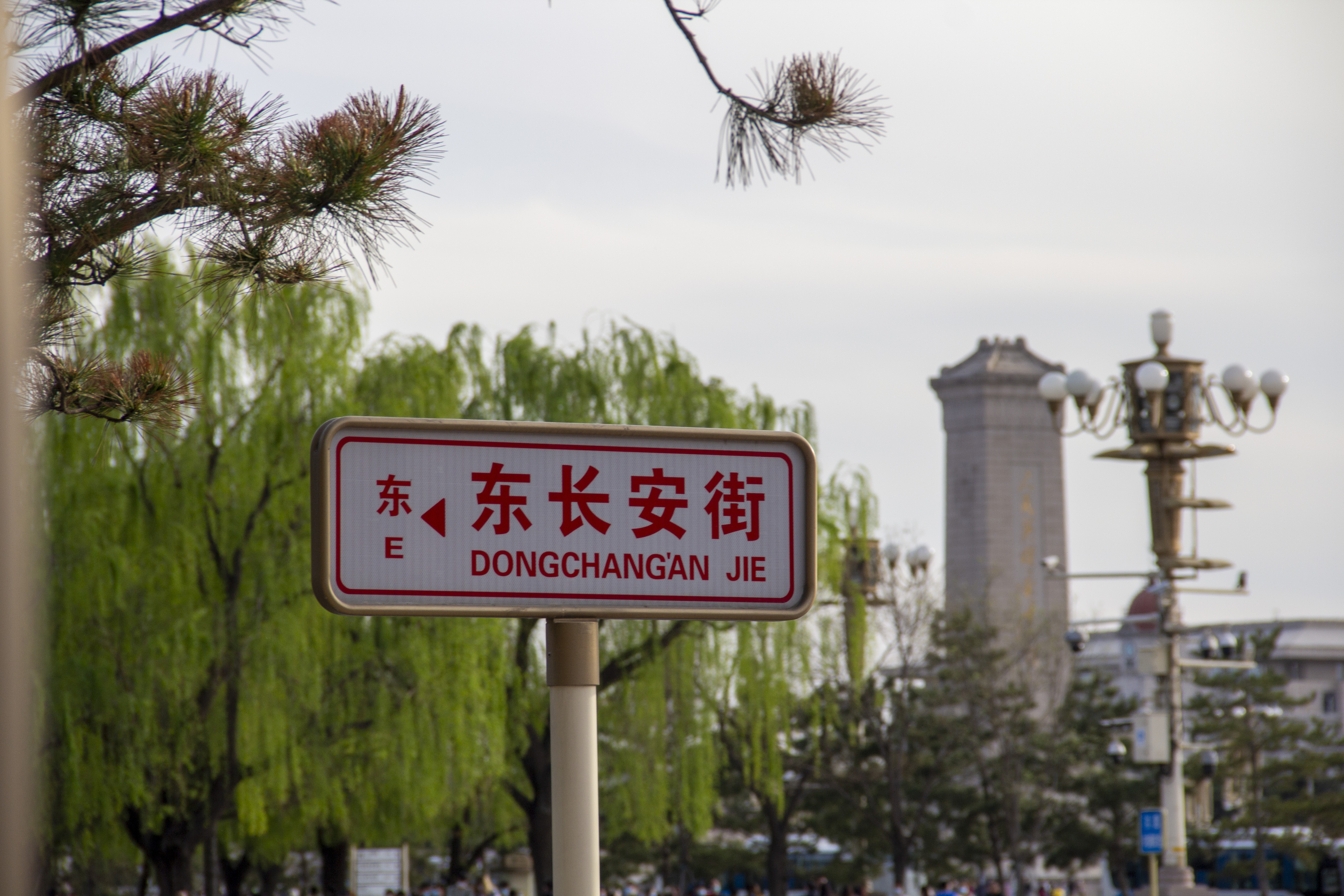
Road name sign of East Chang'an Avenue, Beijing

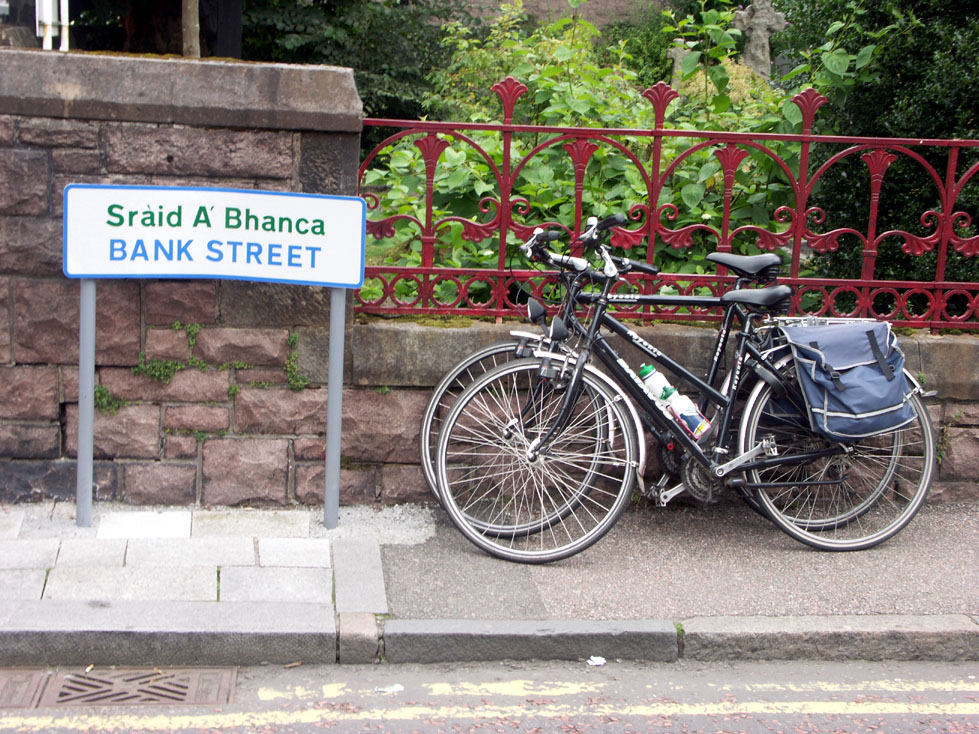
Bilingual road name sign in Fort William, Scotland, in both Scottish Gaelic and English

A street name sign is a type of traffic sign used to identify named roads, generally those that do not qualify as expressways or highways. Street name signs are most often found posted at intersections; sometimes, especially in the United States, in perpendicularly oriented pairs identifying each of the crossing streets.

== Description ==
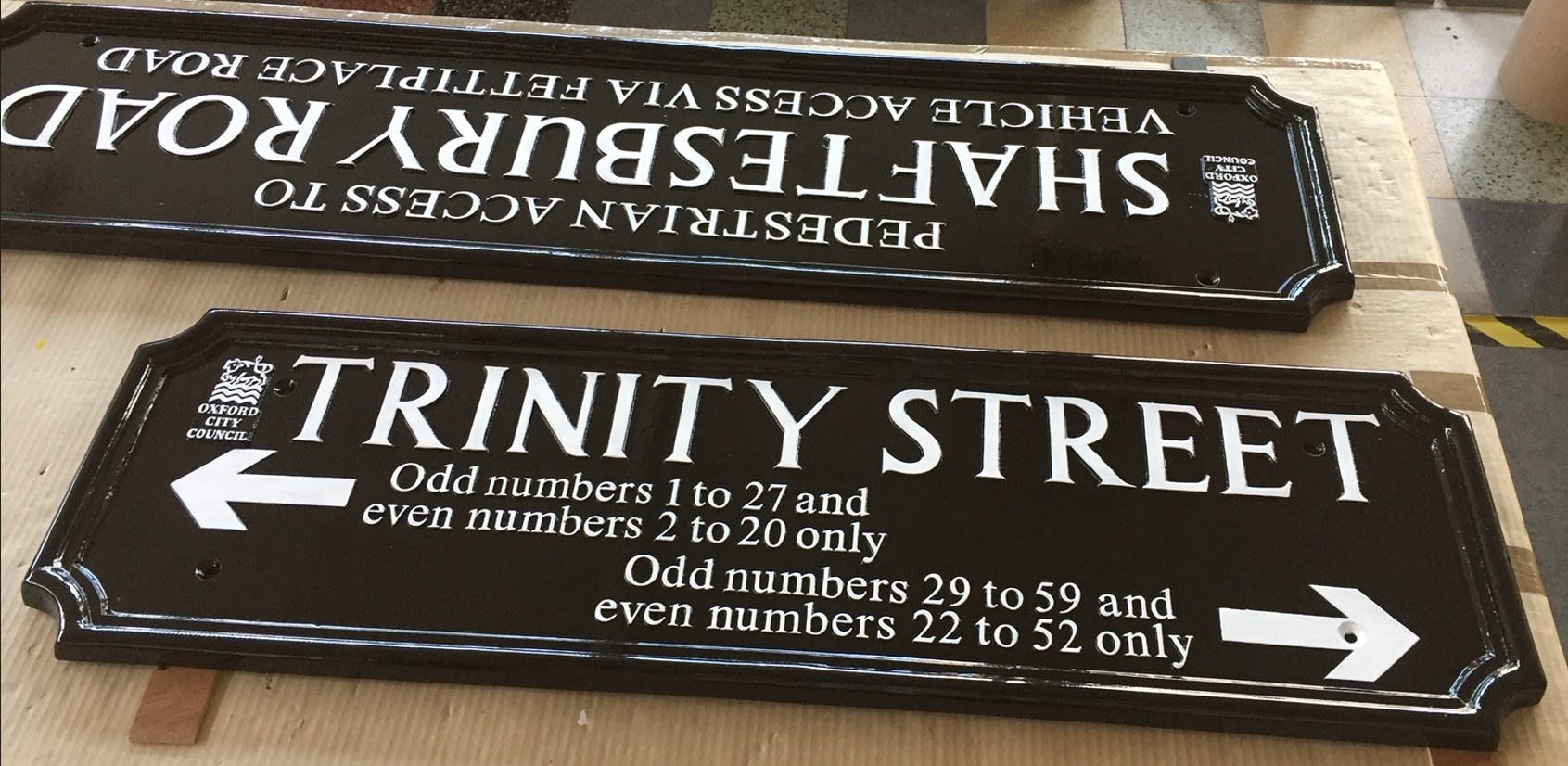
Cast aluminium City of Oxford street nameplate - manufactured by The Royal Label Factory

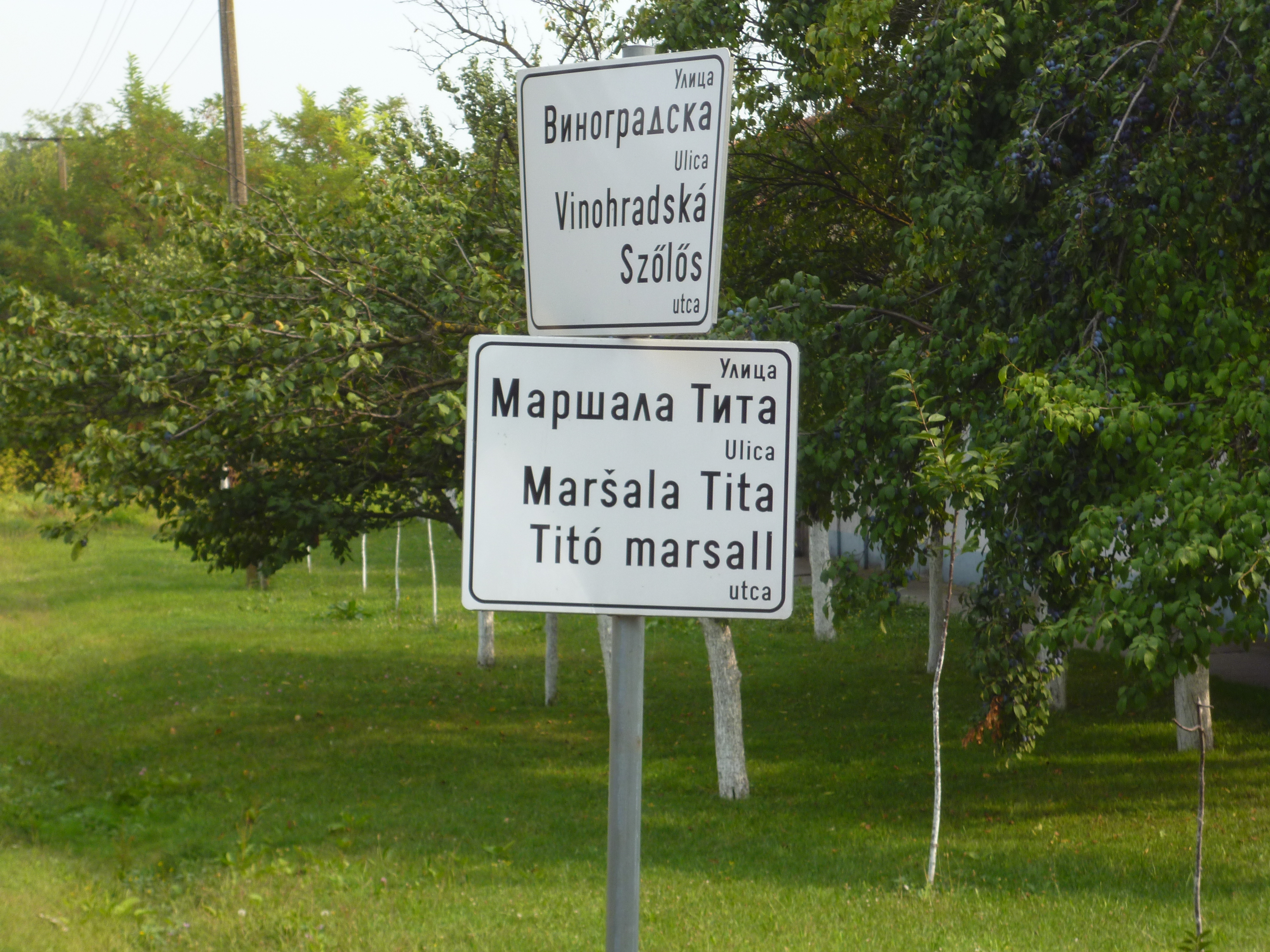
Trilingual street name signs in the Serbian, Slovak, and Hungarian languages, in the village of Belo Blato, Serbia

Standard sign, New York City

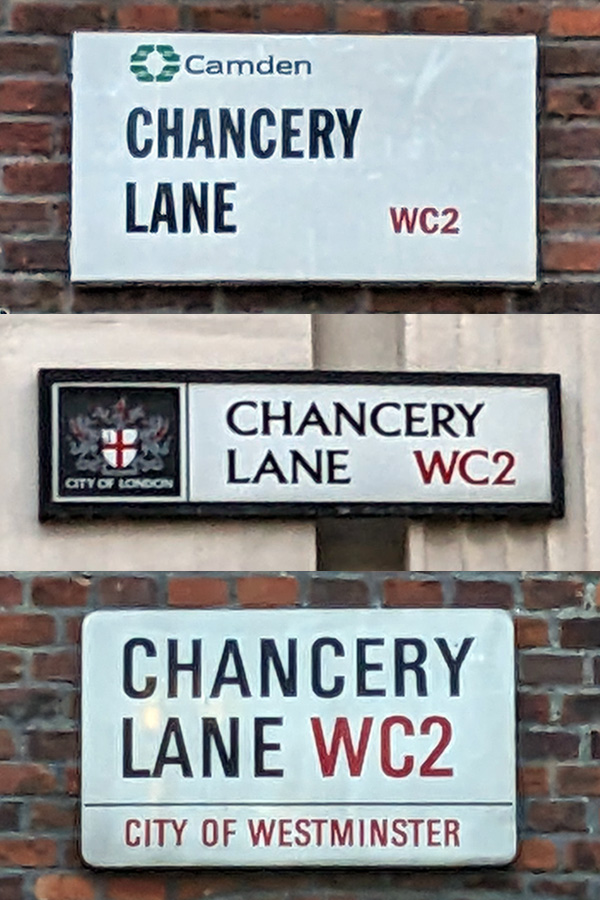
Different boroughs in London have their own designs for street name signs. These examples also include part of the postcode (WC2).

Modern street nameplates (name signs) may be mounted in various ways, such as attached to walls or on utility poles or smaller purpose-made sign poles posted on a streetcorner, or hung over intersections from overhead supports like wires or pylons. When attached to poles, they may be stacked onto each other in alternating directions or mounted perpendicular to each other, with each sign facing the street it represents. Until around 1900 in the US, however, street name signs were often mounted on the corners of buildings, or even chiseled into the masonry, and many of those signs still exist in older neighborhoods. They are commonly used in France and the United Kingdom. The design and style of the sign is usually common to the district in which it appears.

Some street nameplates also indicate the range of house numbers found nearby, or the name or number of the local administrative or postal district. Some street name signs also indicate an alternative name for the street, such as "Fashion Avenue" for Seventh Avenue in New York City, or "Avenue of the Arts" for Huntington Avenue in Boston, Massachusetts. Multilingual signs are common and may be required by law in some areas, such as French-speaking regions of Canada. Multilingual signs are sometimes primarily used to promote local minority languages. See bilingual sign for more information.

Occasionally some signs are a target for vandalism, for example in areas of language controversy; and signs on unusually or famously named streets (perhaps those containing a humorous or obscene word) are especially liable to street sign theft.

In recent years, many US and Canadian cities have adopted the mast arm for traffic signal equipment; major intersections are marked with large signs mounted on the mast arms. This was started in the 1960s by Caltrans. Los Angeles and San Francisco started in the 1970s and recently New York City has introduced the bigger signs at its intersections. In 2013, New York City began to replace the font Highway Gothic, formerly used in street signs, with Clearview, including both upper and lower case letters, considered more readable.

== Color coding and typography ==
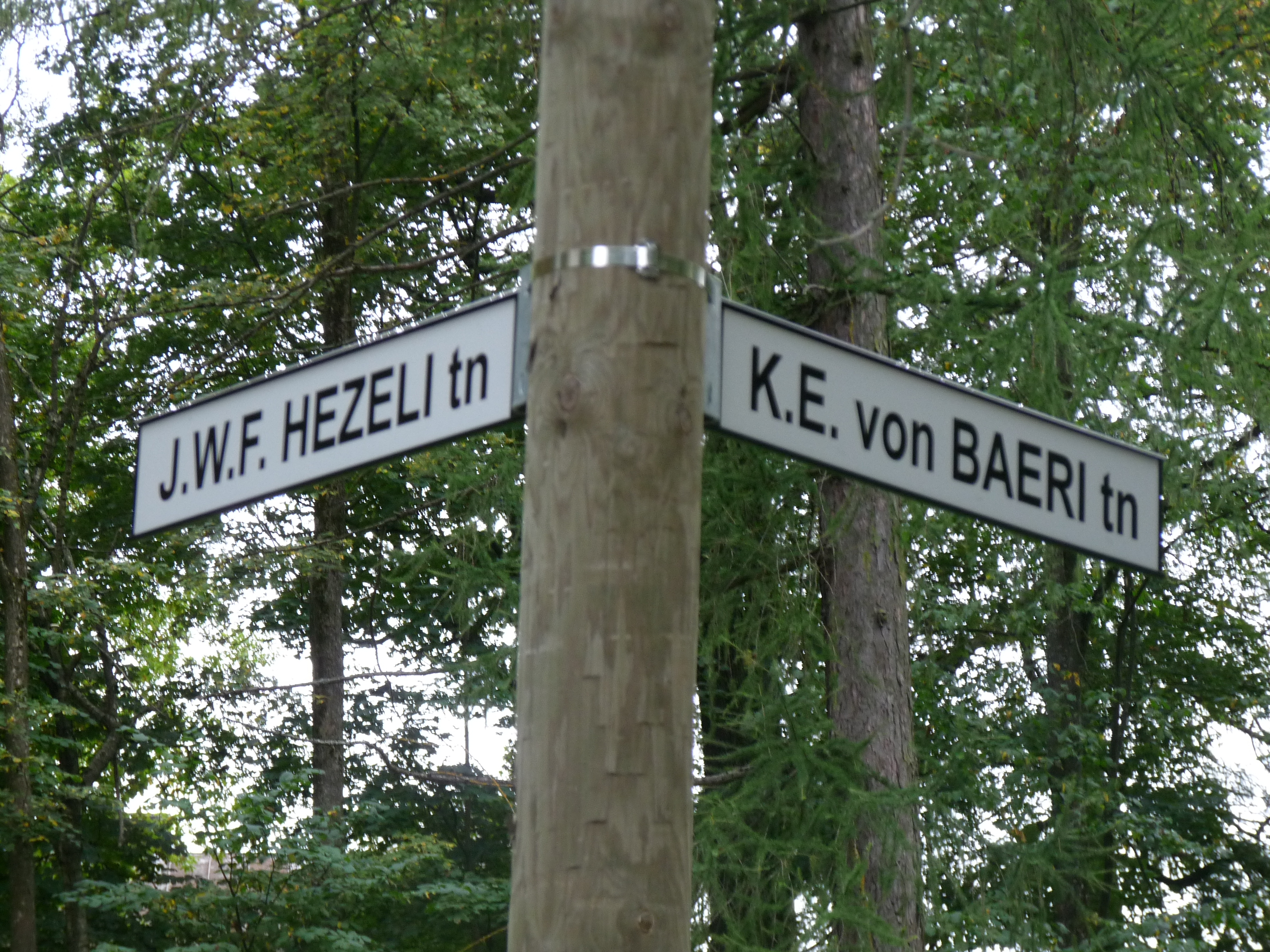
Street sign corner in Tartu, Estonia

Usually, the color scheme used on the sign just reflects the local standard (for example, white letters on a green background are common throughout the US). However, in some cases, the color of a sign can provide information, as well. One example can be found in Minneapolis, Minnesota. Within its city limits, all roads designated as a snow emergency route use a blue sign; these are typically major arterial routes. Other roads have green signs. Other places sometimes use blue or white signs to indicate private roads.

As of 2009, the Manual on Uniform Traffic Control Devices (MUTCD) approved color schemes for street name signs including a green, blue, or brown background with white text, or a white background with black text. Despite the MUTCD's attempt to restrict street name signs to only the aforementioned color schemes, other color schemes are used in some cities. For example, the city of Mesa, Arizona, uses ruby red colored street name signs at signalized intersections in the Fiesta District in the western part of the city. The city of Houston, Texas, allows for street name signs in several of its neighborhoods (usually part of a management district, where property owners assess additional fees to themselves to pay for extra services) to be of significantly different color schemes and fonts from the citywide standard. Since the new MUTCD standard was adopted, some cities have begun transitioning from noncompliant colors. San Jose, California, traditionally used white letters on a black background on its street name signs for many decades, but shifted during the 2010s to white letters on a green background.

In 1952 in the UK, David Kindersley submitted a design, MoT Serif, to the British Ministry of Transport, which required new lettering to use on United Kingdom road signs. Although the Road Research Laboratory found Kindersley's design more legible, the all-capitals design with serifs was passed over in favour of that of Jock Kinneir and Margaret Calvert. Many of the street signs in Britain use Kindersley fonts.

== Gallery ==
Street name signs

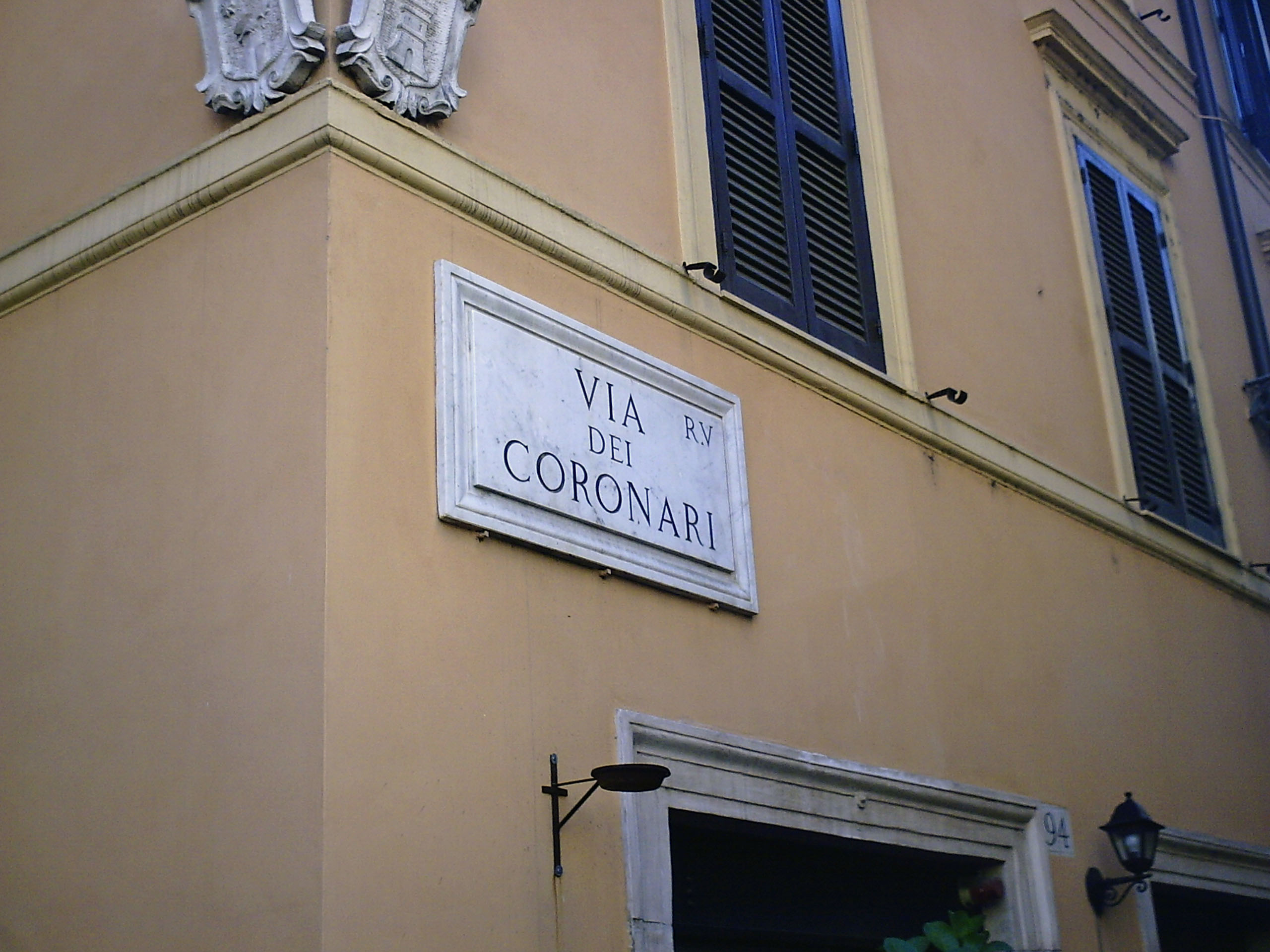
Historic marble street sign in Rome, Italy

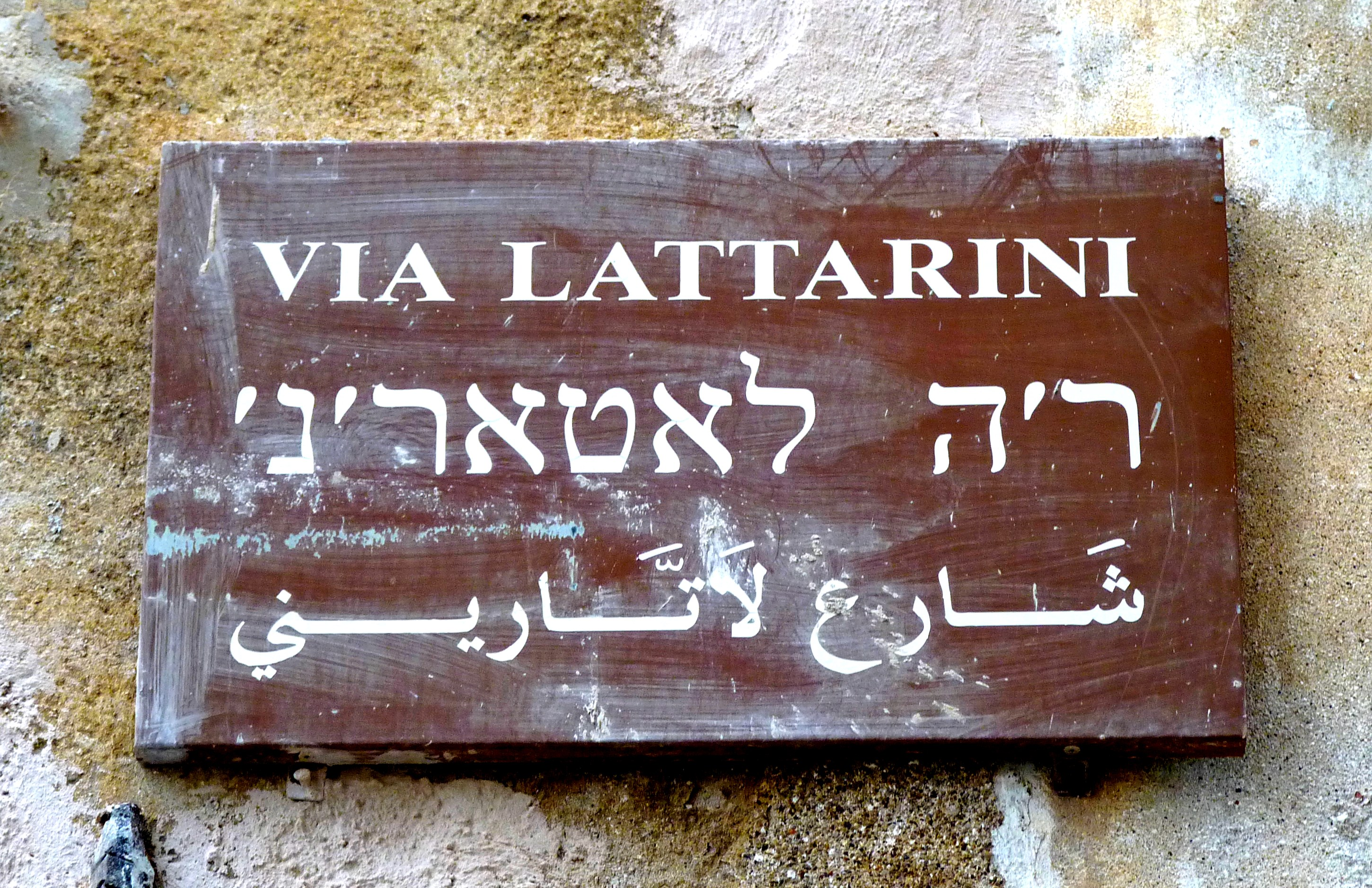
Palermo, Italy

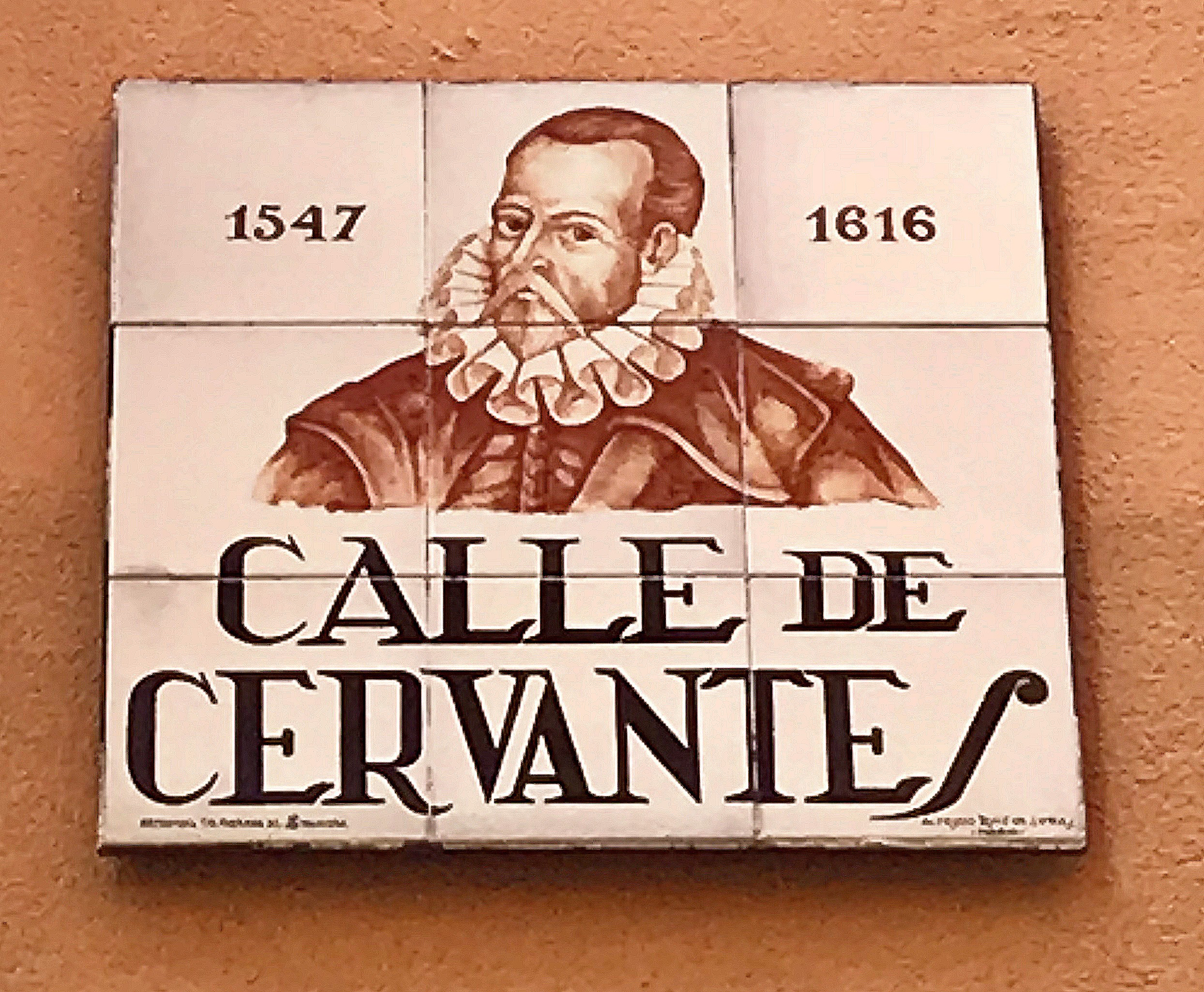
Madrid, Spain

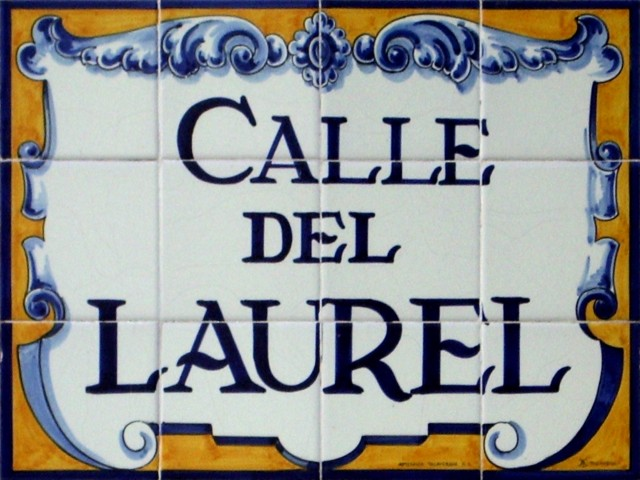
Spanish street sign, Calle Laurel

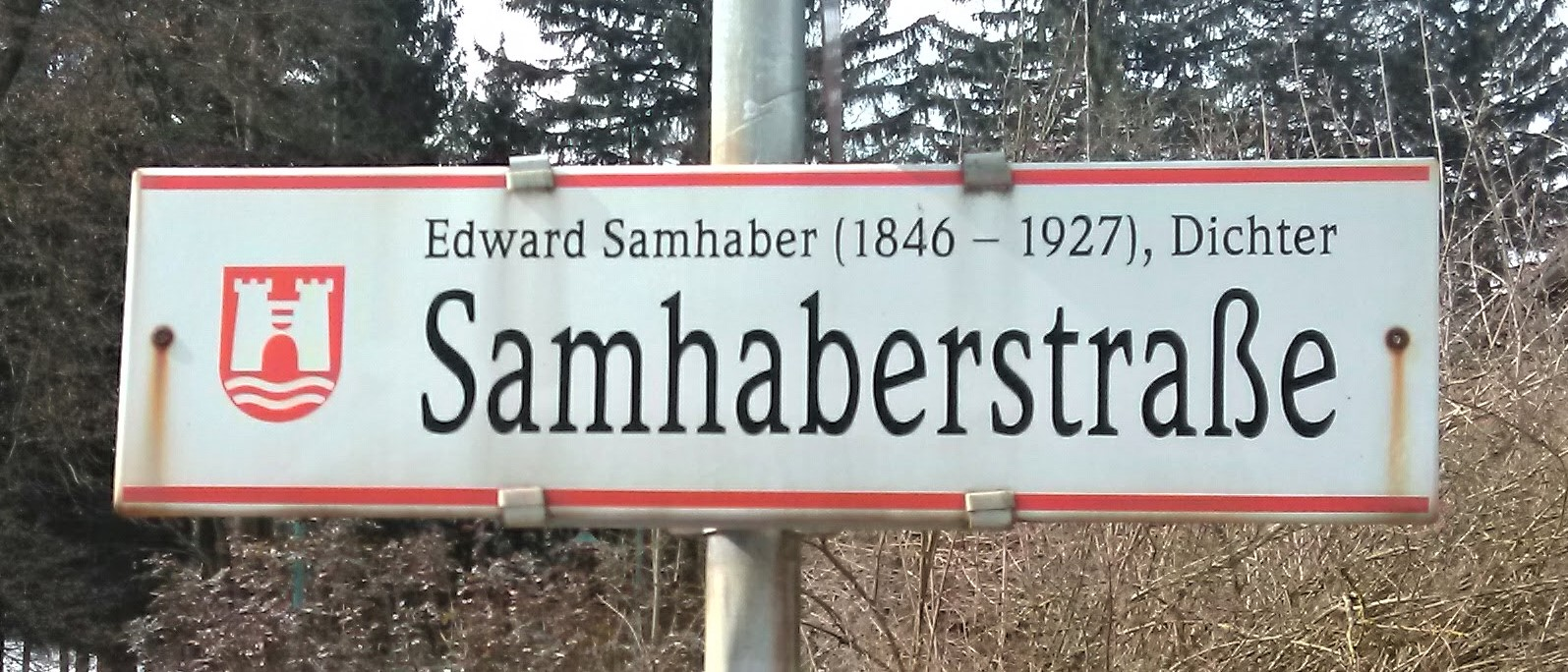
Street sign, Linz, Austria

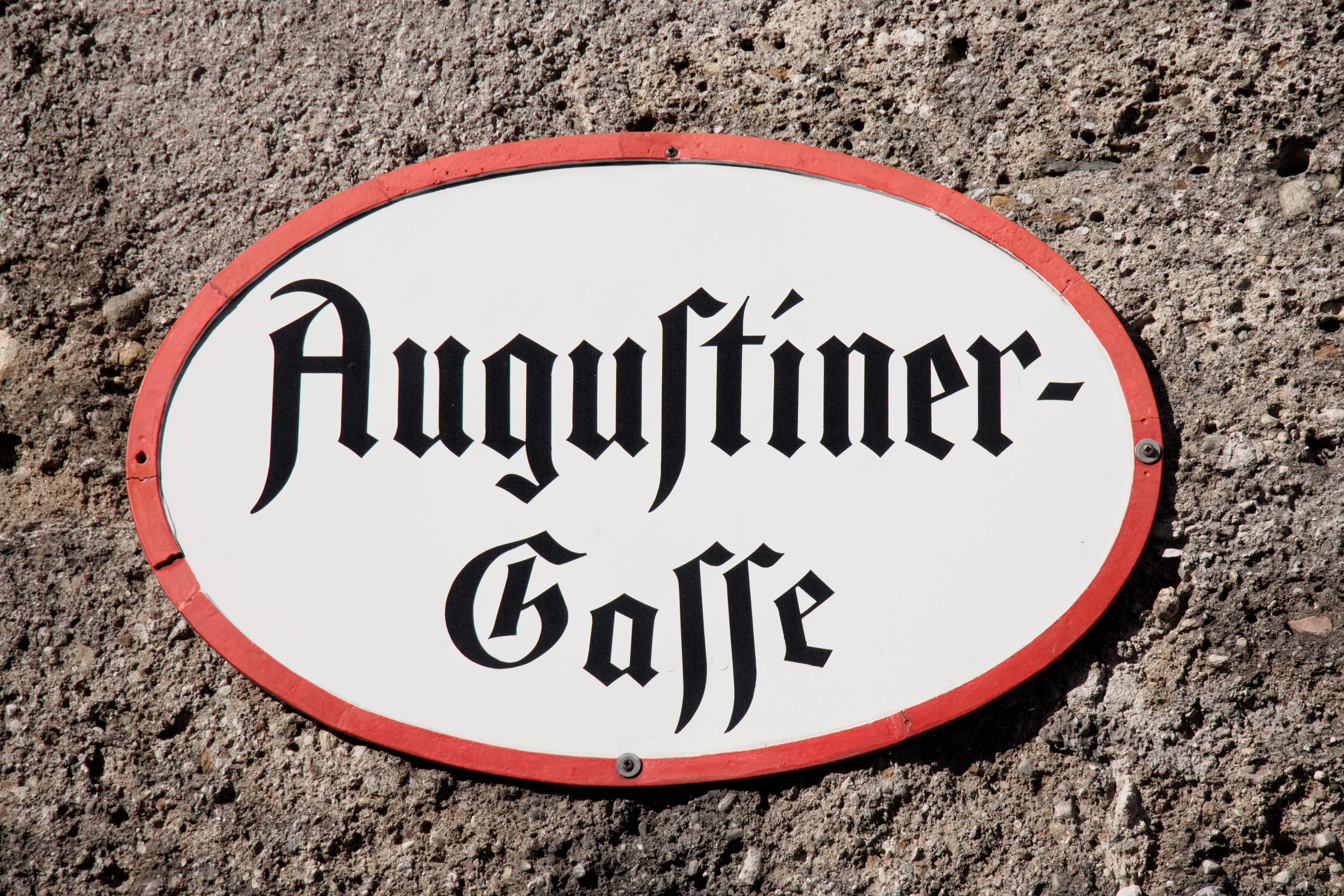
Street sign Salzburg, Austria

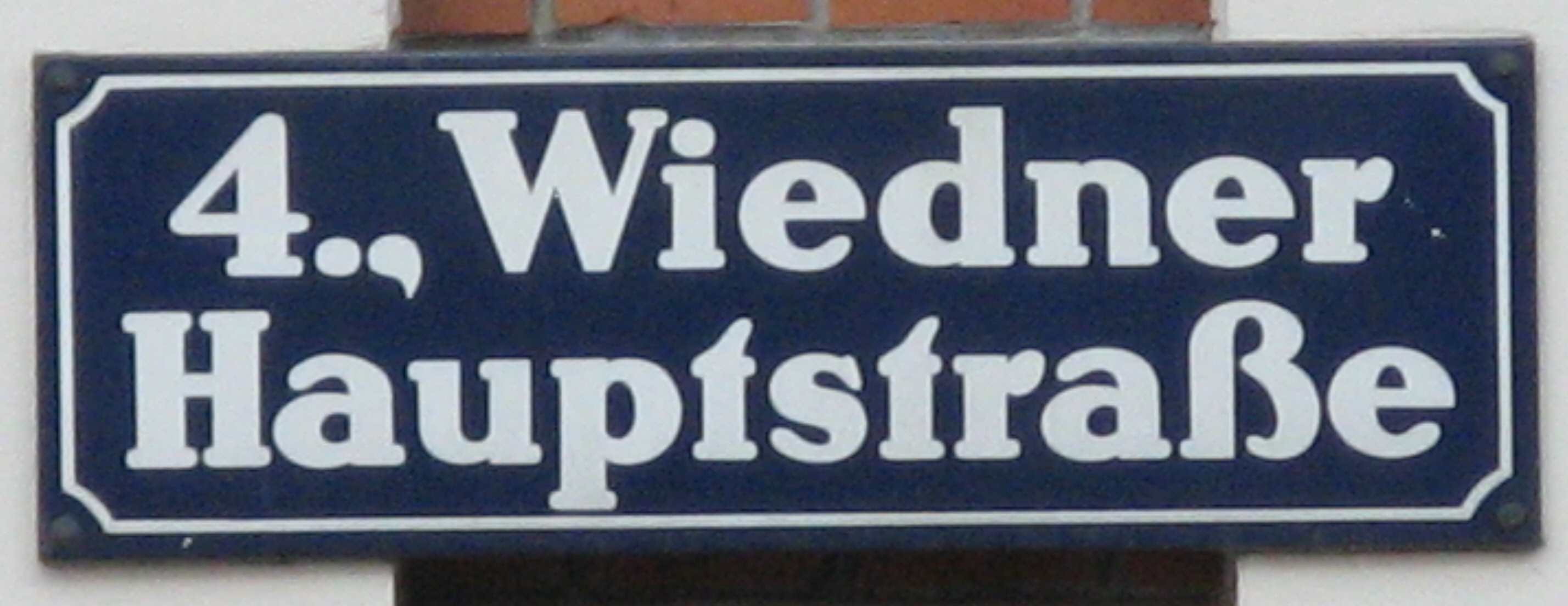
Street sign, Vienna, Austria

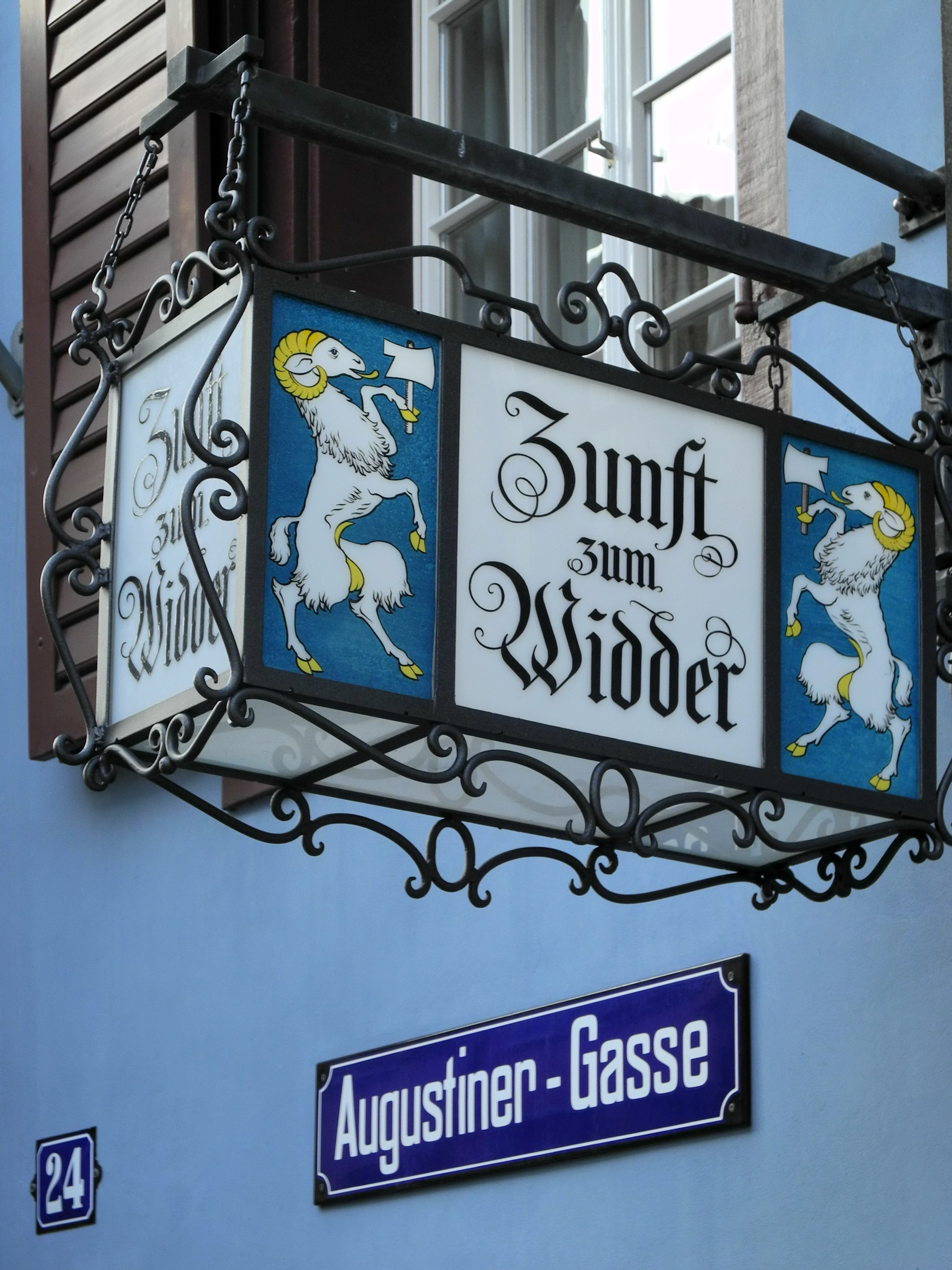
Sign in Zürich, Switzerland

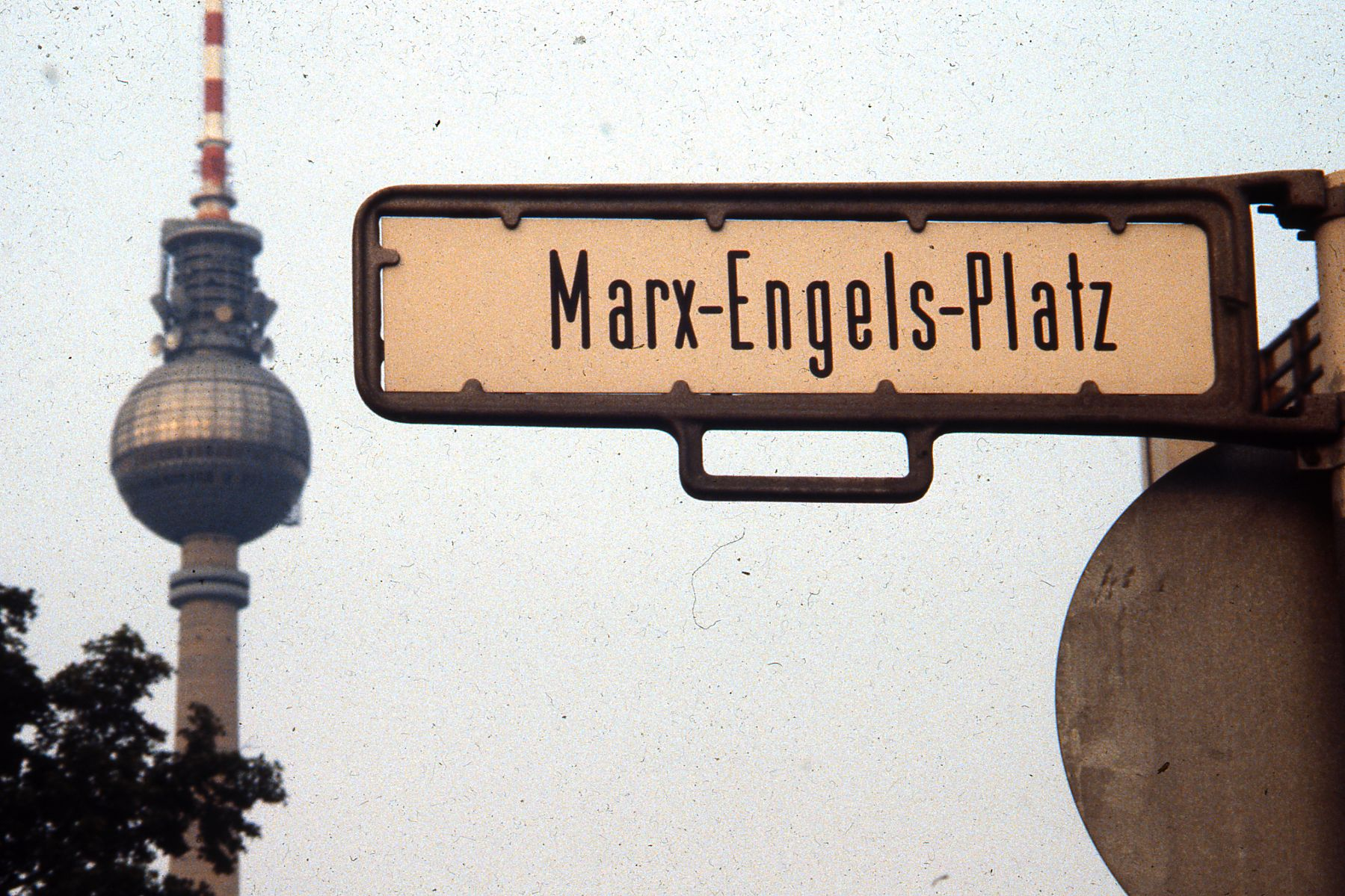
East Berlin street sign for the former Marx-Engels-Platz (1984)

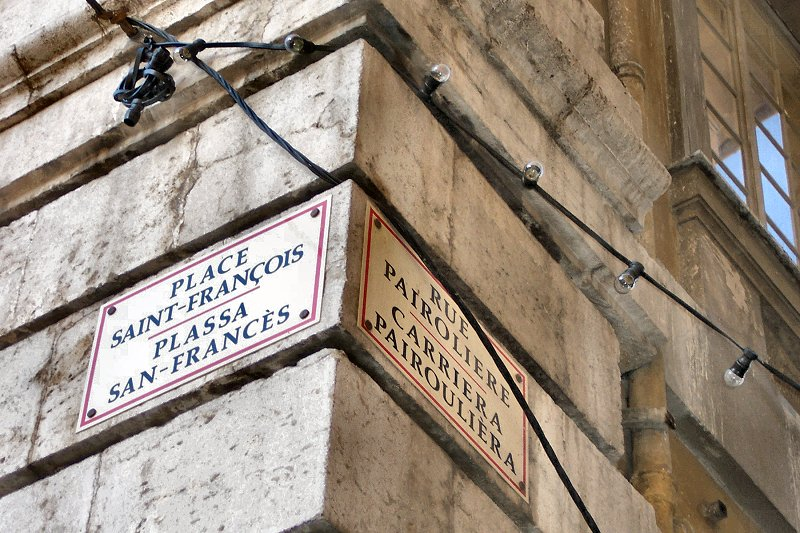
Bilingual (French/Niçois) wall-mounted street signs in Nice, France

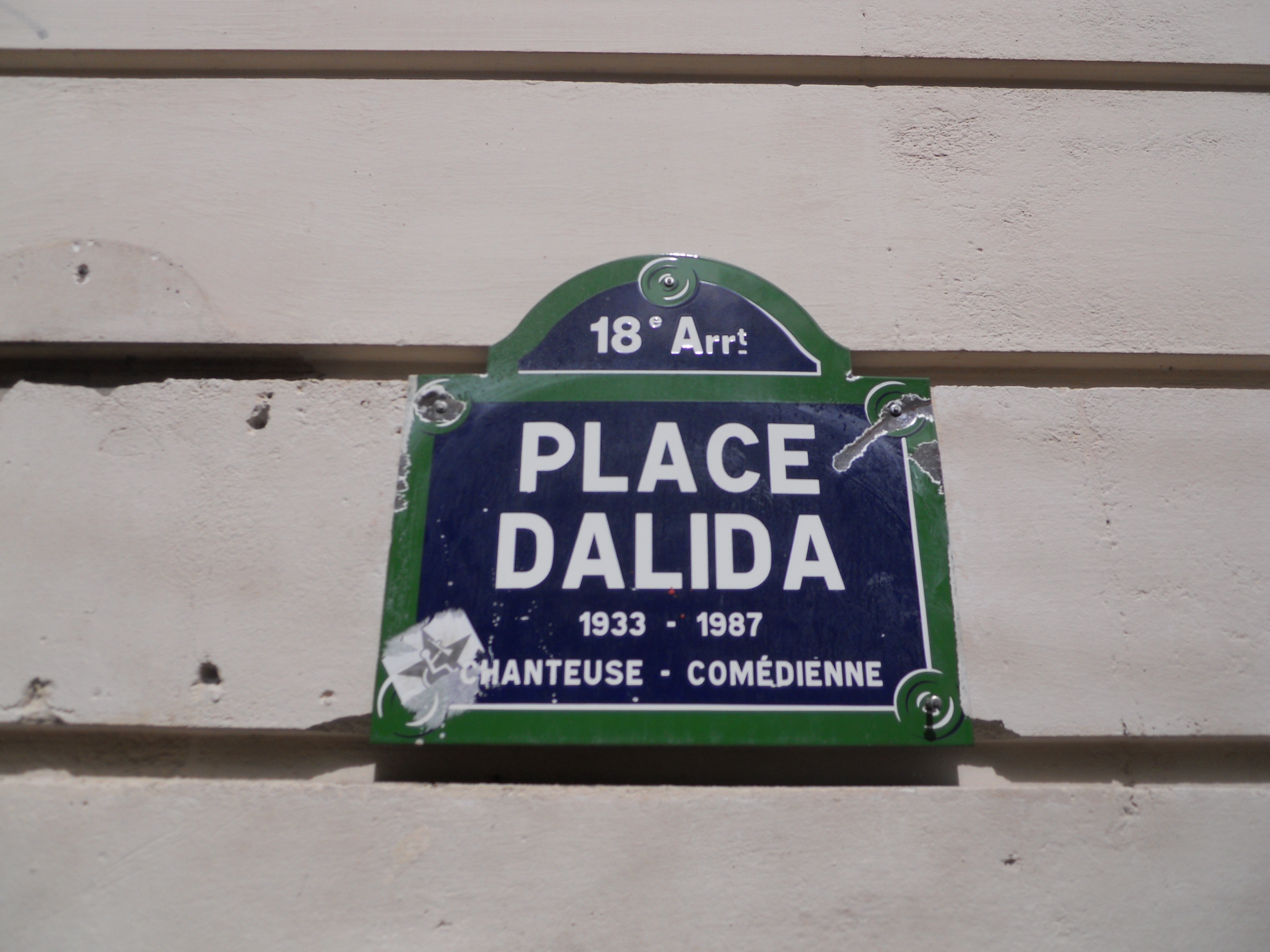
A street sign in Montmartre, Paris

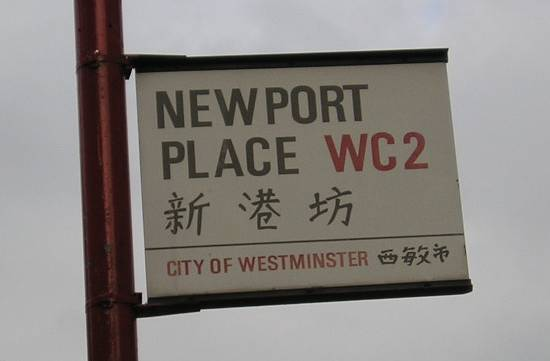
Bilingual street name sign in Chinatown in Westminster, London, England

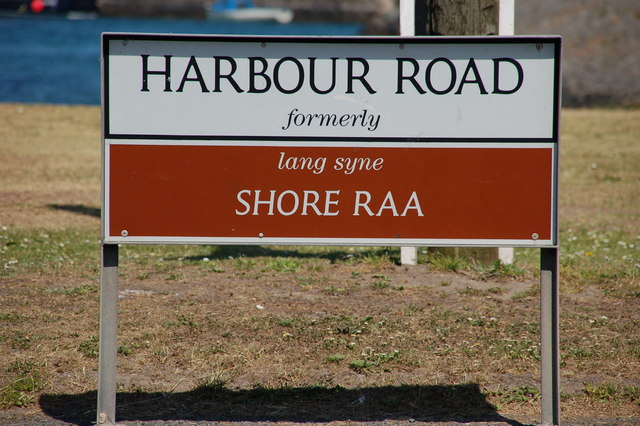
A bilingual street sign in Ulster Scots and English in Ballyhalbert, Northern Ireland

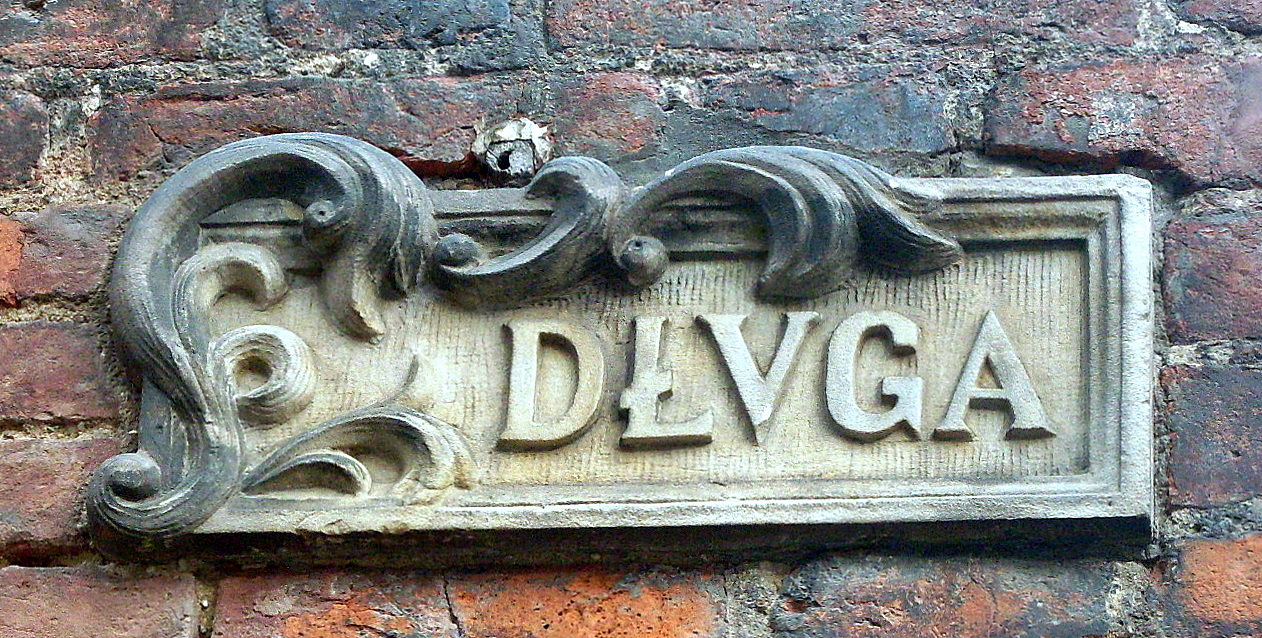
Street sign at Długa Street in Gdańsk, Poland

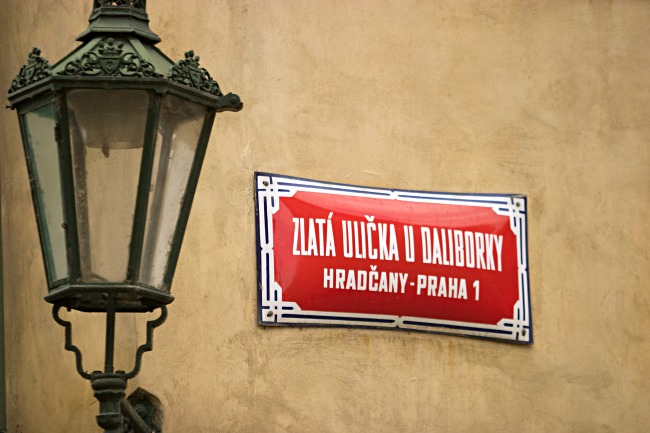
Street name sign in Prague, Czech Republic

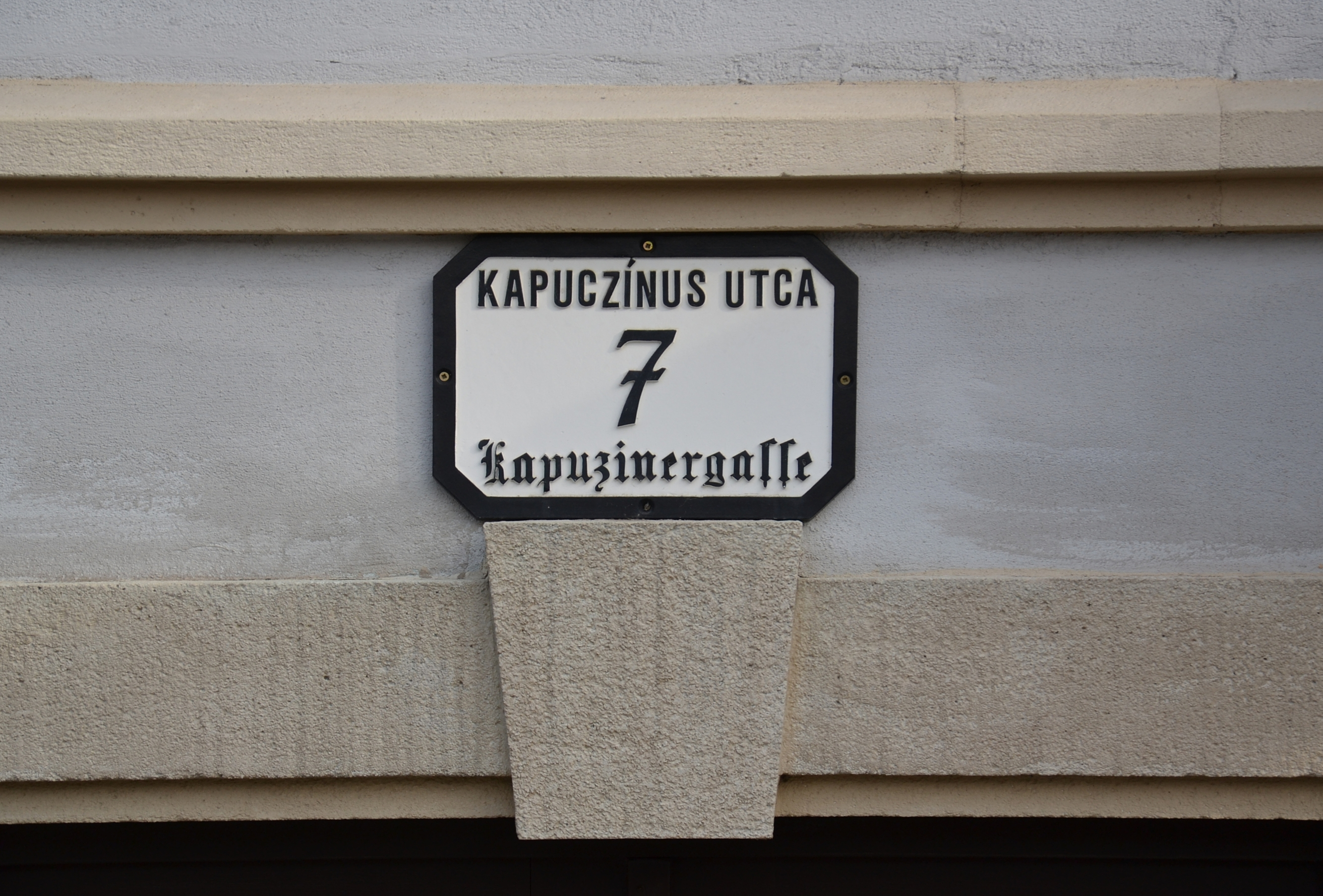
Historic Hungarian/German street sign in Bratislava, Slovakia

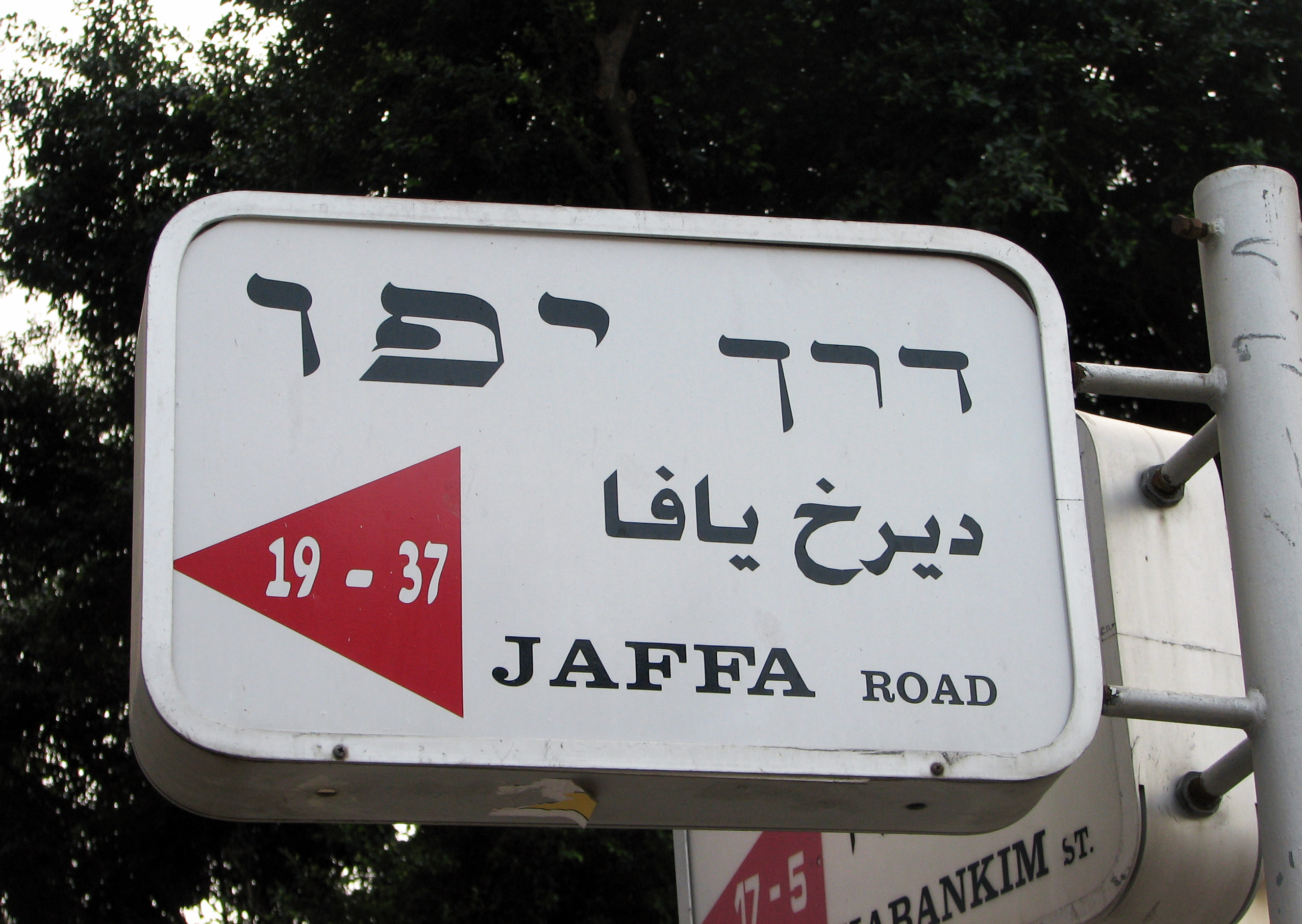
Haifa, Israel

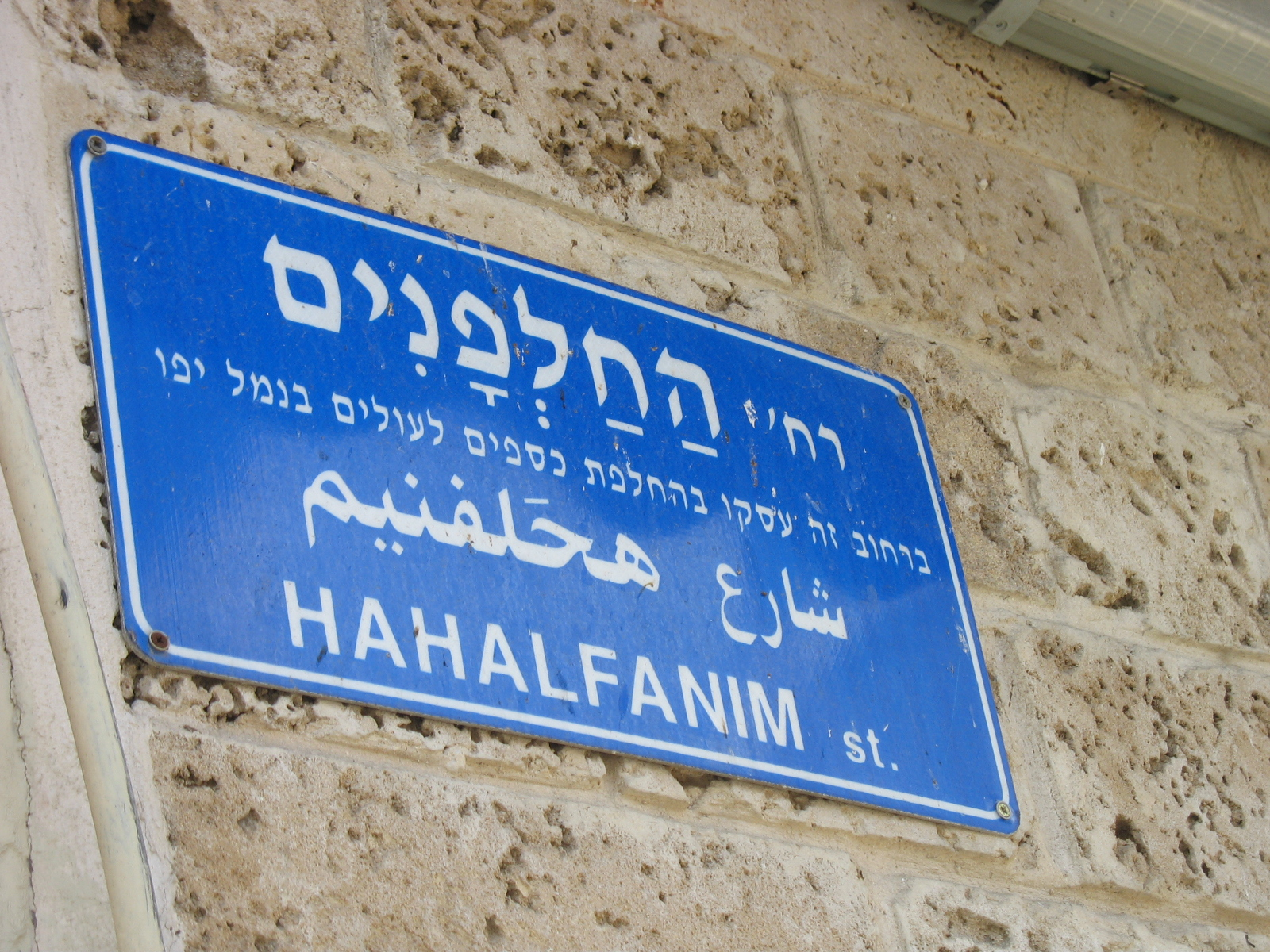
A street sign in Tel Aviv, Israel

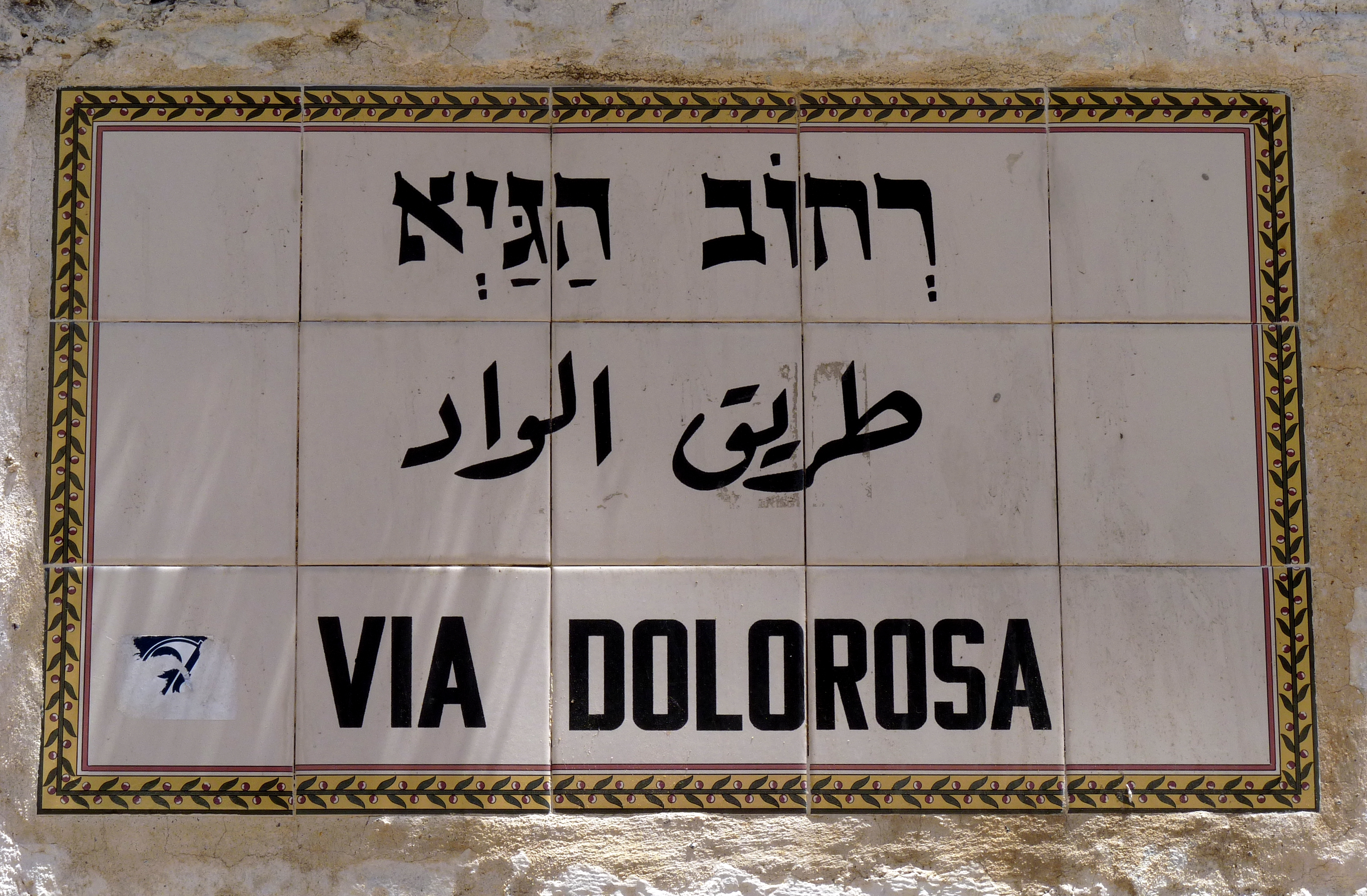
Via Dolorosa, Jerusalem

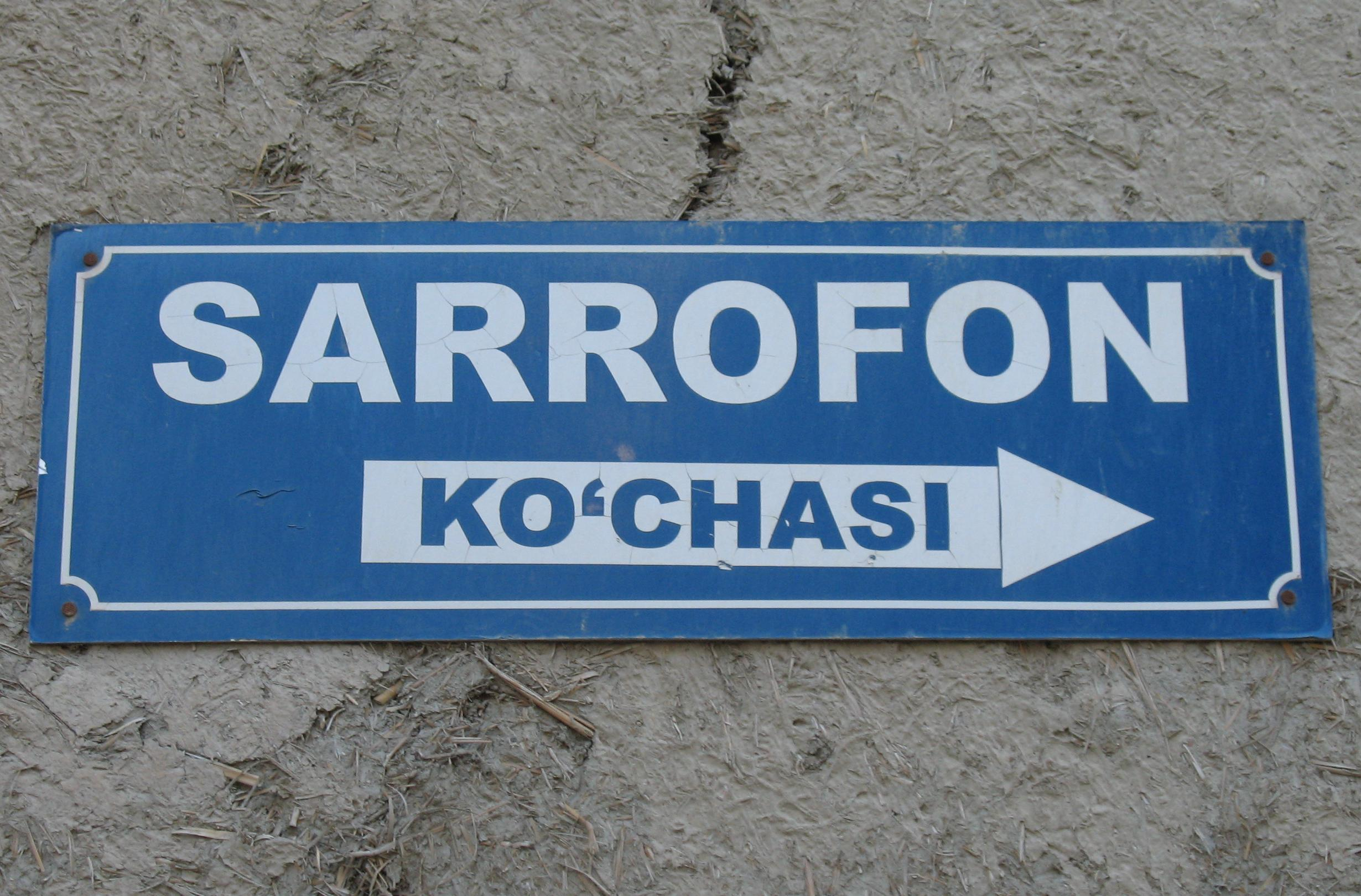
Example in Bukhara, Uzbekistan

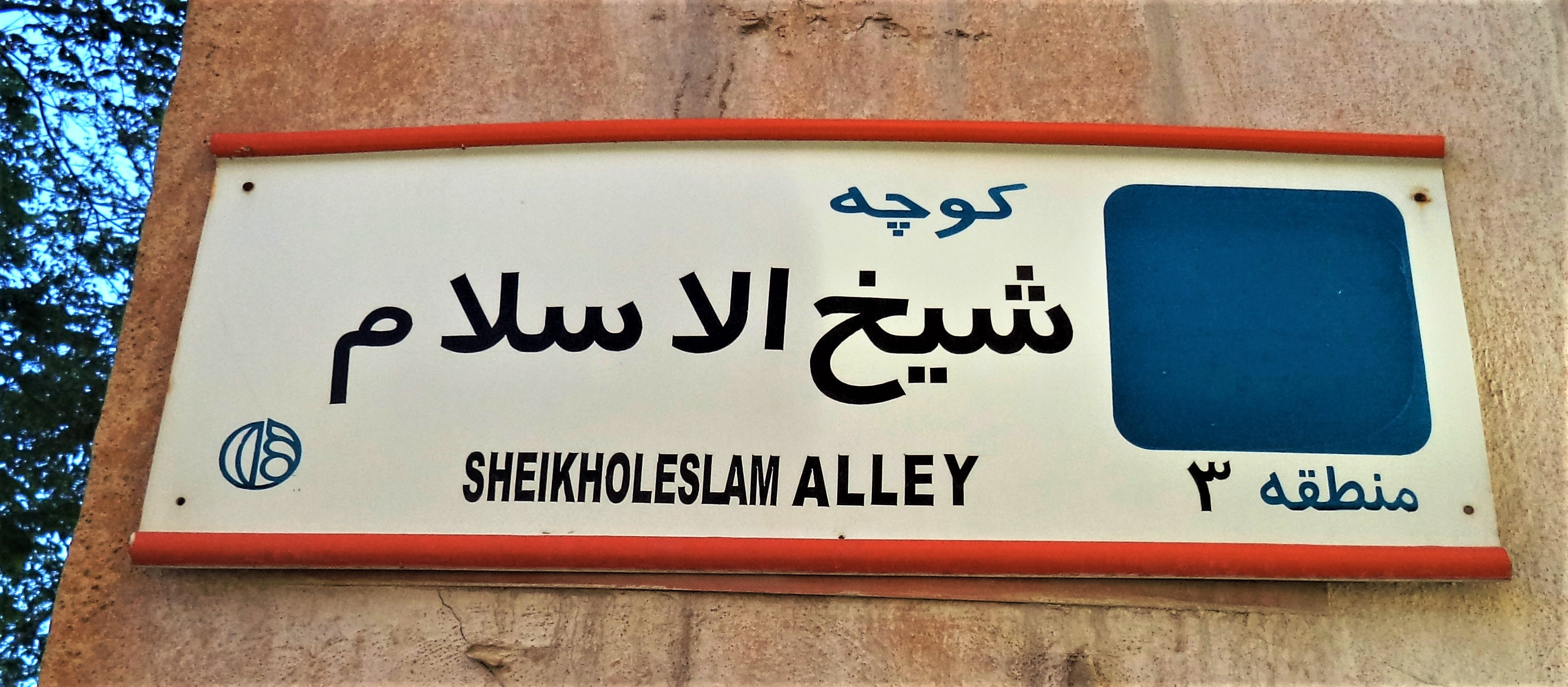
A street sign in Isfahan, Iran

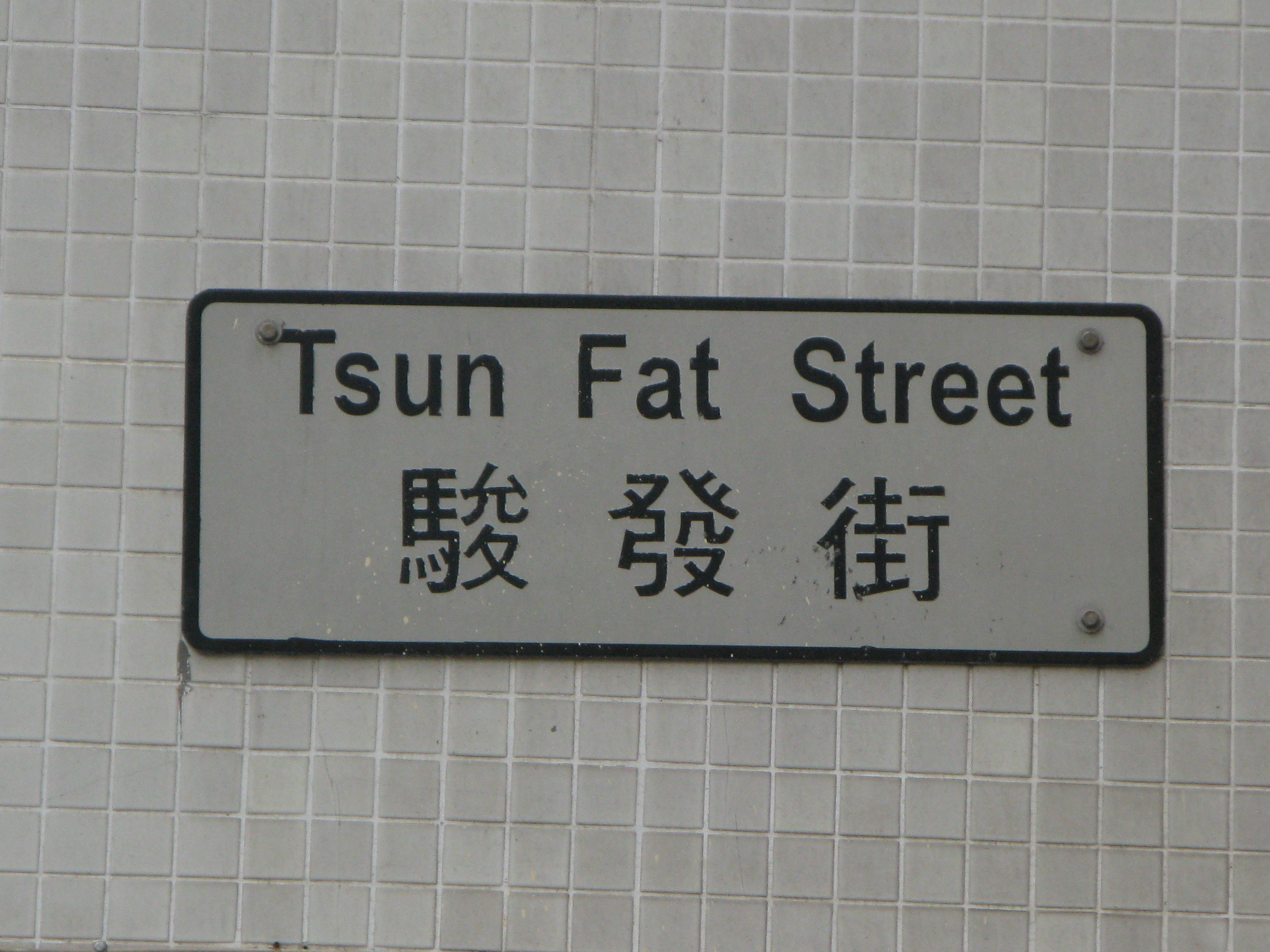
Street sign, Hong Kong

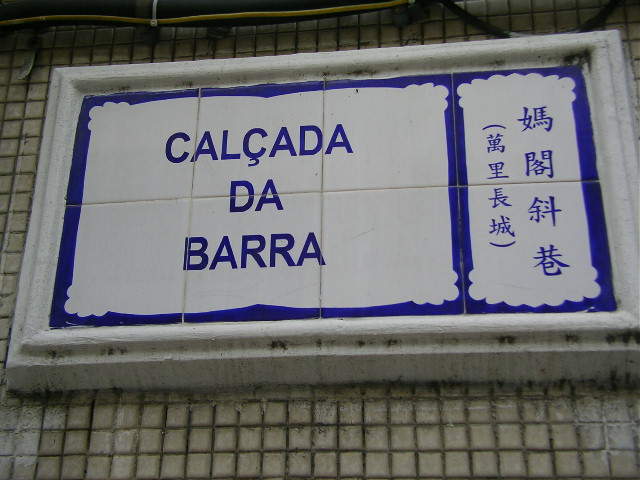
Street sign, Macau

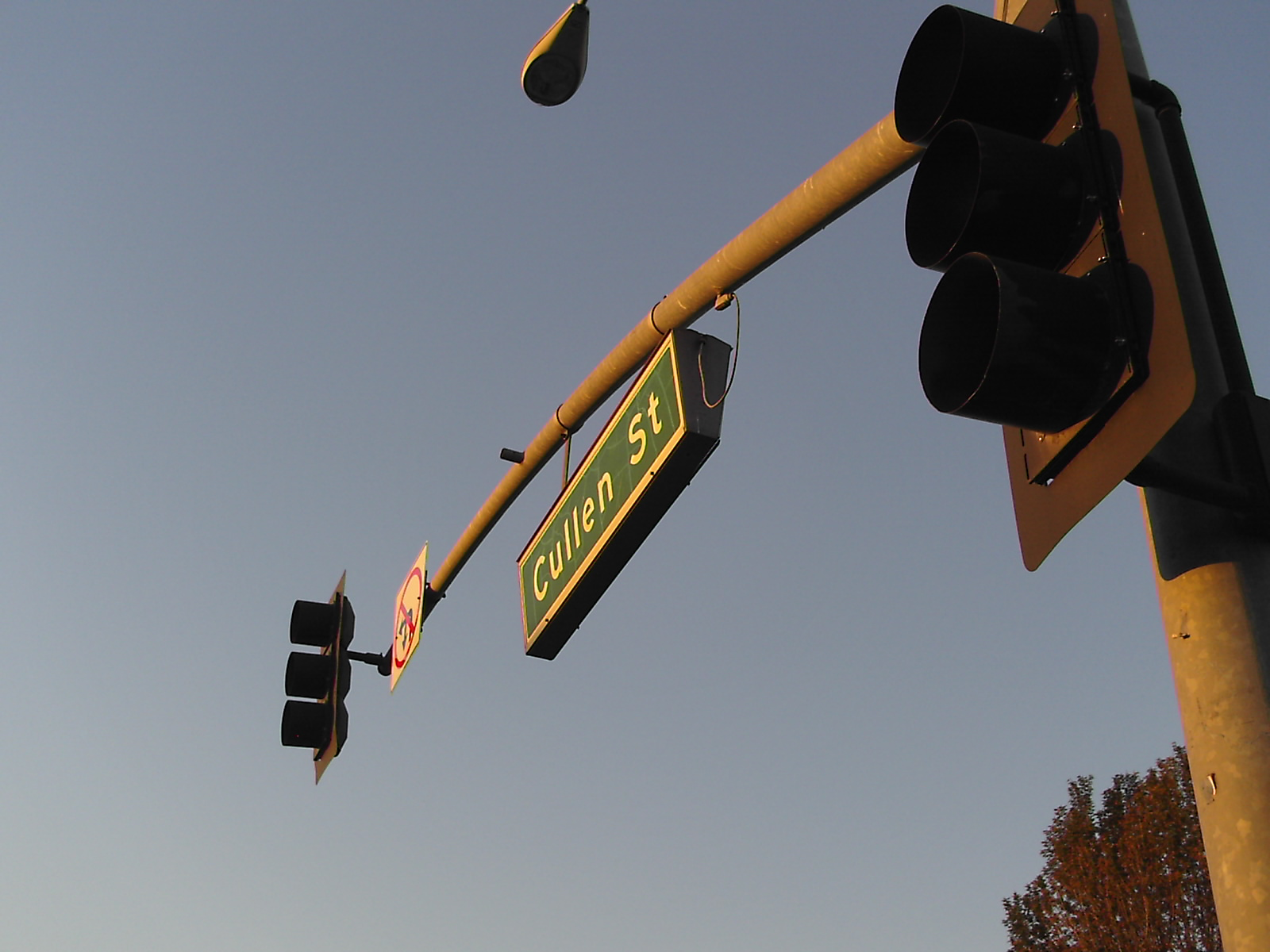
Internally illuminated mast-mounted street sign in Whittier, California

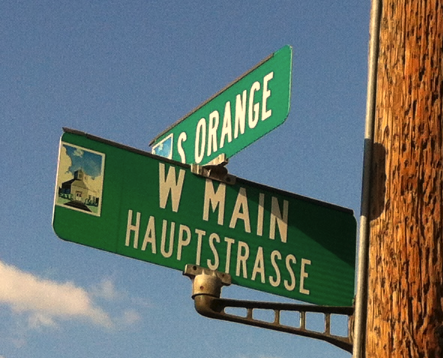
Bilingual sign in Fredericksburg, Texas

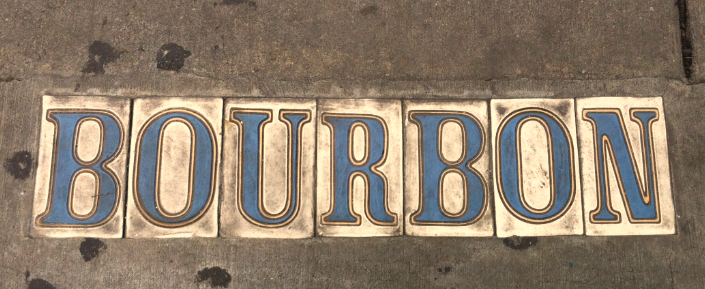
Tiles in the sidewalk mark many streets in the older neighborhoods of New Orleans, Louisiana

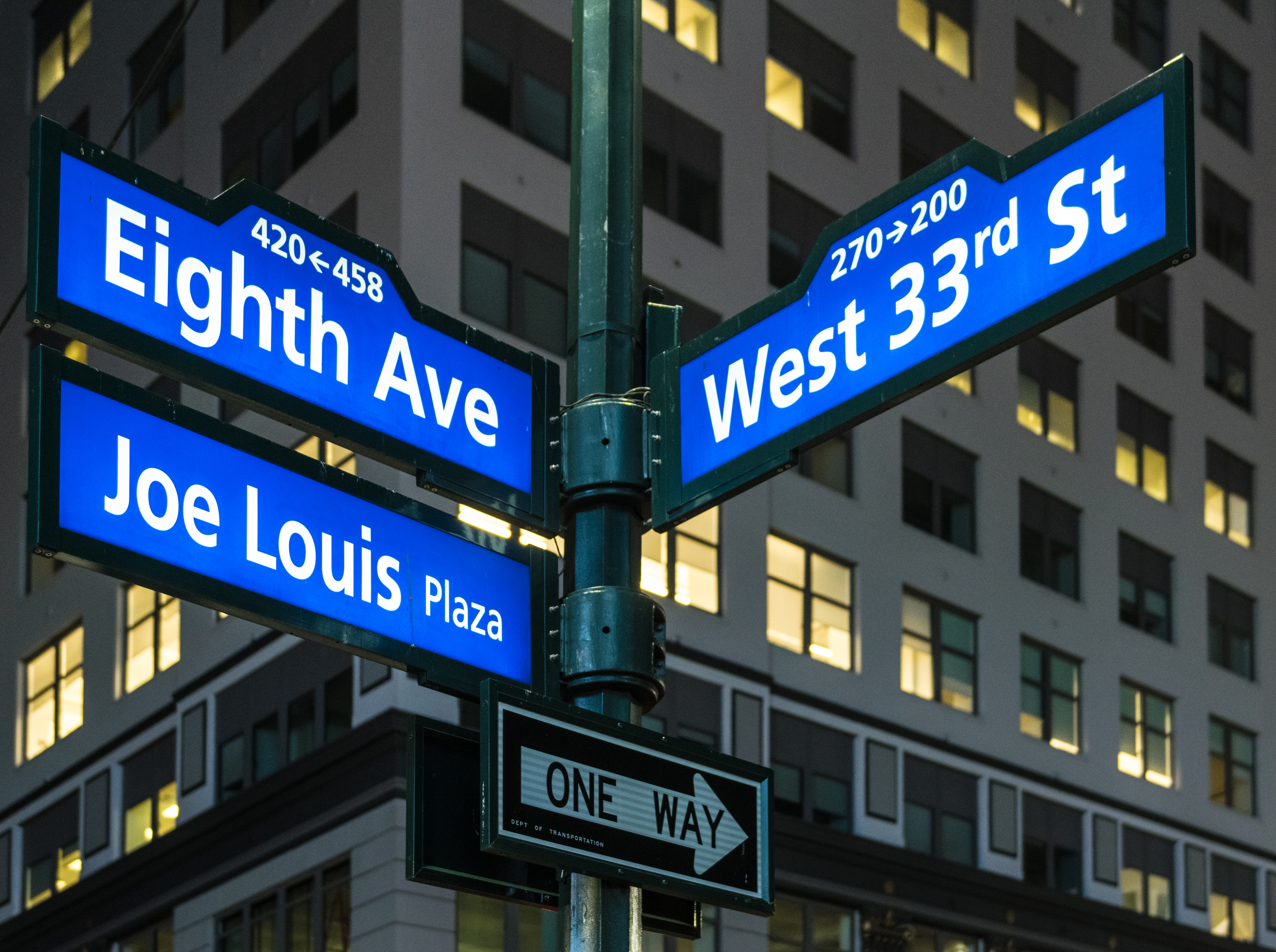
New York City

Sign installed in Midtown Manhattan, New York City

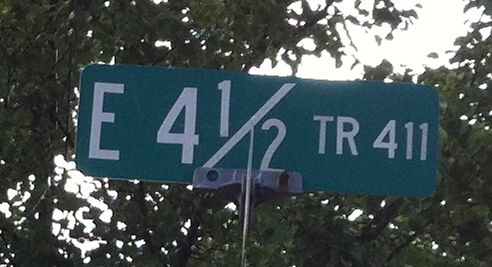
Four and a half street in Berwick, Pennsylvania

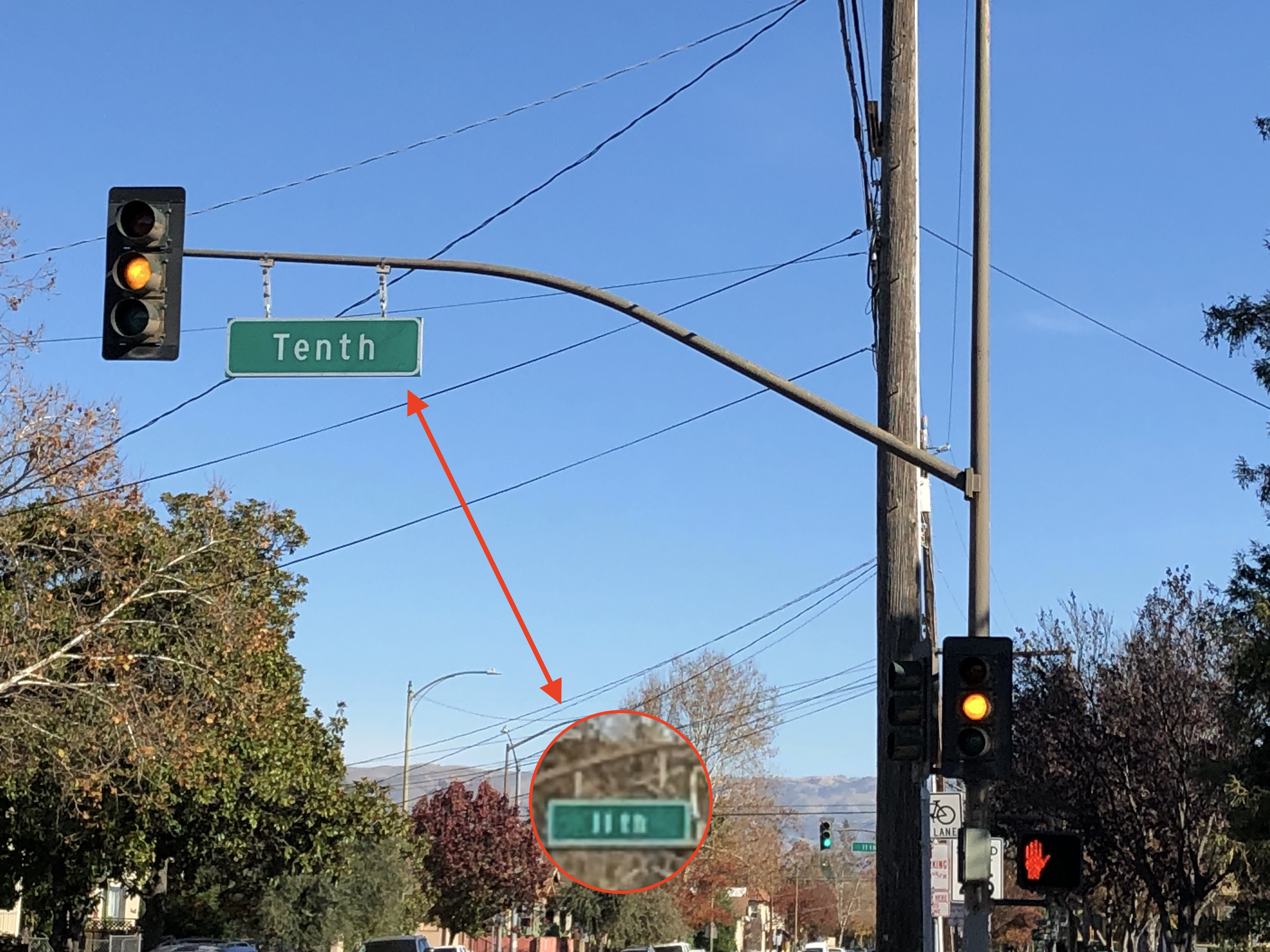
Alternating numeral and spelled-out street name signs in San Jose, California

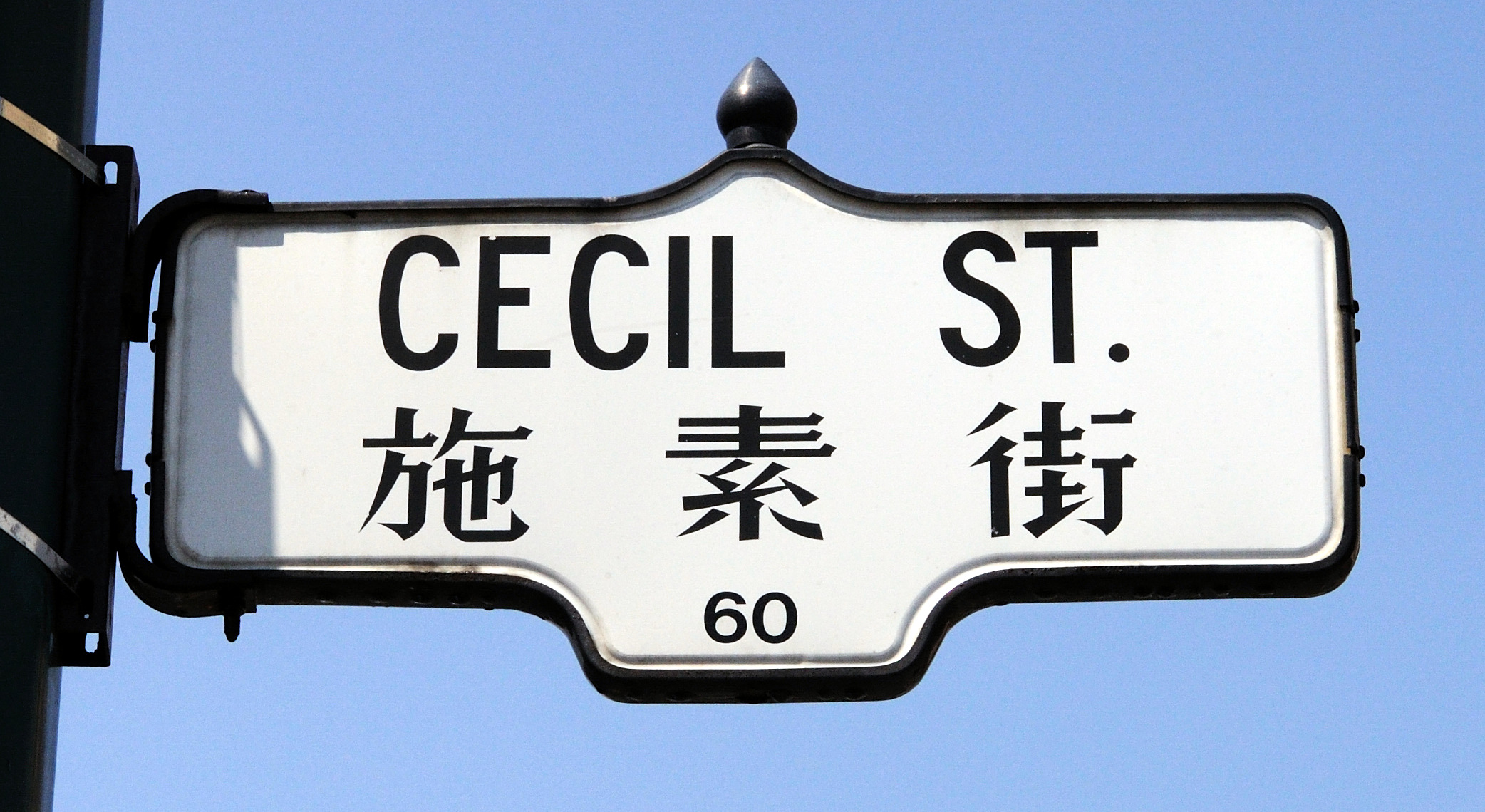
Bilingual street sign in Chinese and English in the Chinatown neighbourhood of Toronto, Canada

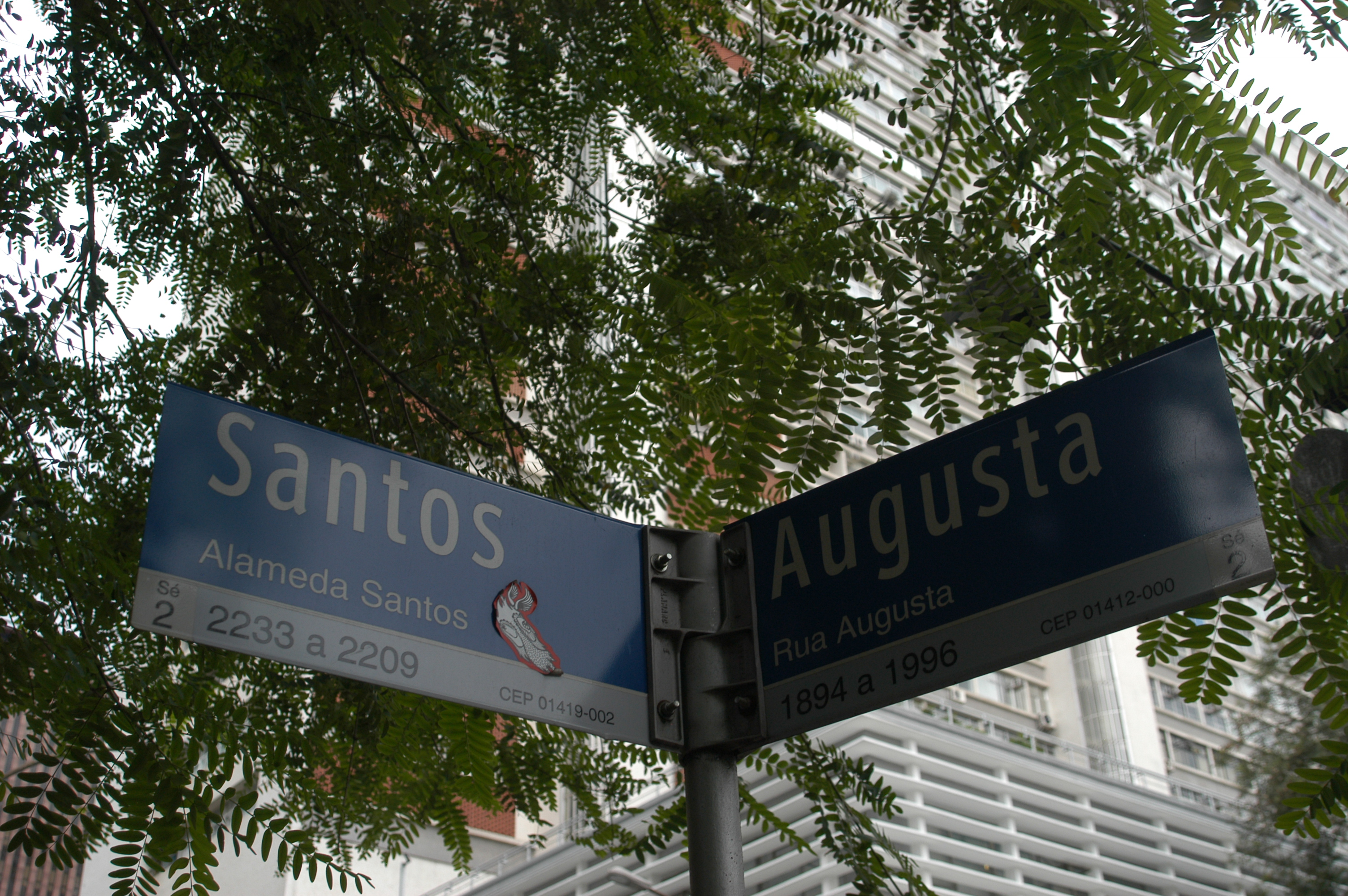
Street sign in São Paulo, Brazil

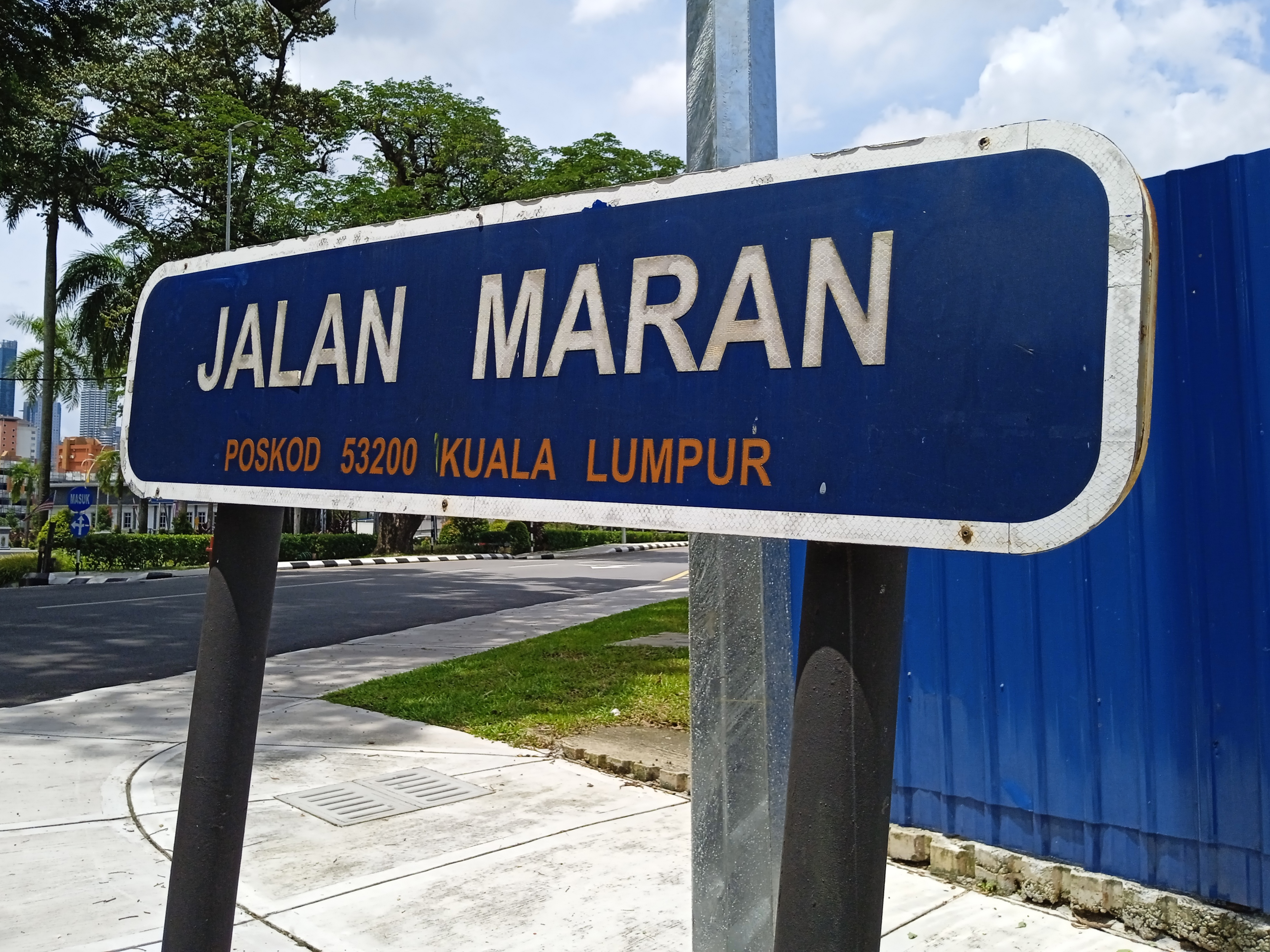
Street sign in Kuala Lumpur, Malaysia

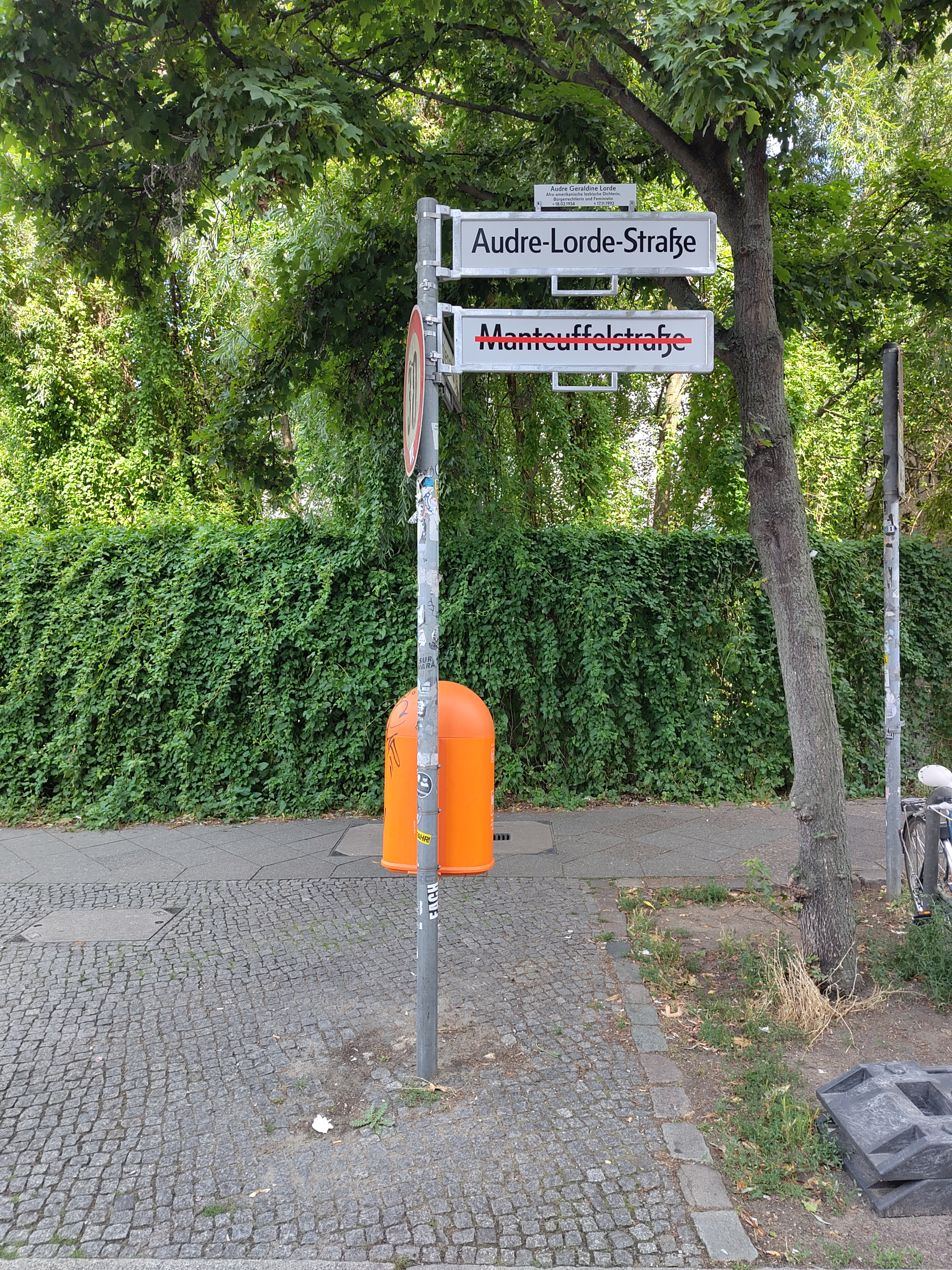
Street sign in Berlin, Germany

== See also ==
- FHWA Series fonts
- List of public signage typefaces
- Street sign theft
- Traffic sign
