= Montalbano =

Montalbano may refer to:

== People with the surname ==
- Bartolomeo Montalbano (1598–1651), Italian composer
- Danielle Montalbano (born 1989), American-Israeli figure skater
- Giuseppe Montalbano (1895–1989), Italian politician
- Giuseppe Montalbano (1925–2021), Italian politician
- James Montalbano, American typeface designer
- Joseph A. Montalbano (born 1954), American politician and judge
- Melchiorre da Montalbano, 13th-century Italian architect and sculptor
- Michael S. Montalbano (1918–1989), American computer scientist and poet
- Renato Montalbano (1931–2019), Italian actor
- Rose Montalbano, American baseball player
- Vince Montalbano, American guitarist

== Places ==
- Montalbano Elicona, a comune (municipality) in Sicily, Italy
- Montalbano Jonico, a comune (municipality) in Basilicata, Italy
- Montalbano (mountain), a mountain chain in Tuscany, Italy
  - A sub-region of the Chianti wine area in Tuscany, Italy
- Montalbano, Firenzuola, Tuscany, Italy
- Montalbano, Zocca, Emilia-Romagna, Italy

== Fictional characters and related works ==
- Salvo Montalbano, fictional Sicilian detective created by Andrea Camilleri
  - Inspector Montalbano (TV series), Italian show starring the fictional detective
    - The Young Montalbano, prequel to Inspector Montalbano TV series
- Rinaldo di Montalbano, hero from 12th-century chivalric epic

== See also ==
- Montalbán (surname)
- Montalbani
