= Comparison of traffic signs in English-speaking territories =

This is a comparison of road signs in countries and regions that speak majorly English, including major ones where it is an official language and widely understood (and as a lingua franca).

Among the countries listed below, Liberia, Nigeria, and the Philippines have ratified the Vienna Convention on Road Signs and Signals, while the United Kingdom has signed the convention but not yet ratified it. Botswana, Eswatini, Lesotho, Malawi, South Africa, Tanzania, Zambia, and Zimbabwe are all Southern African Development Community (SADC) members who drive on the left and use the SADC Road Traffic Signs Manual. The Manual on Uniform Traffic Control Devices (MUTCD) used in the United States has also influenced signing practices in other countries.

== Differences between traffic signs in English-speaking countries/regions ==
	Australia	Bahamas	Belize	Canada	Hong Kong	India	Ireland	Jamaica	Liberia	Mauritius	New Zealand	Nigeria	Philippines	South Africa	Malta	Singapore	United Kingdom	United States	U. S. Virgin Islands	Zimbabwe
Drives on...	Left	Left	Right	Right	Left	Left	Left	Left	Right	Left	Left	Right	Right	Left	Left	Left	Left	Right	Left	Left
Speed units	km/h	mph	mph	km/h	km/h	km/h	km/h	km/h	km/h or mph	km/h	km/h	km/h	km/h	km/h	km/h	km/h	mph	mph	mph	km/h
Sign typeface	AS1744 (Highway Gothic)	Highway Gothic	Highway Gothic	Highway Gothic or Clearview	Transport or Helvetica	Multilingual Highway Gothic, Transport or Arial	Transport and Motorway	Highway Gothic	Highway Gothic	Transport	Highway Gothic or Transport	Highway Gothic	Highway Gothic or Clearview	DIN 1451	Transport	Local variety	Transport and Motorway	Highway Gothic or Clearview	Highway Gothic or Clearview	DIN 1451

=== Differences in units ===
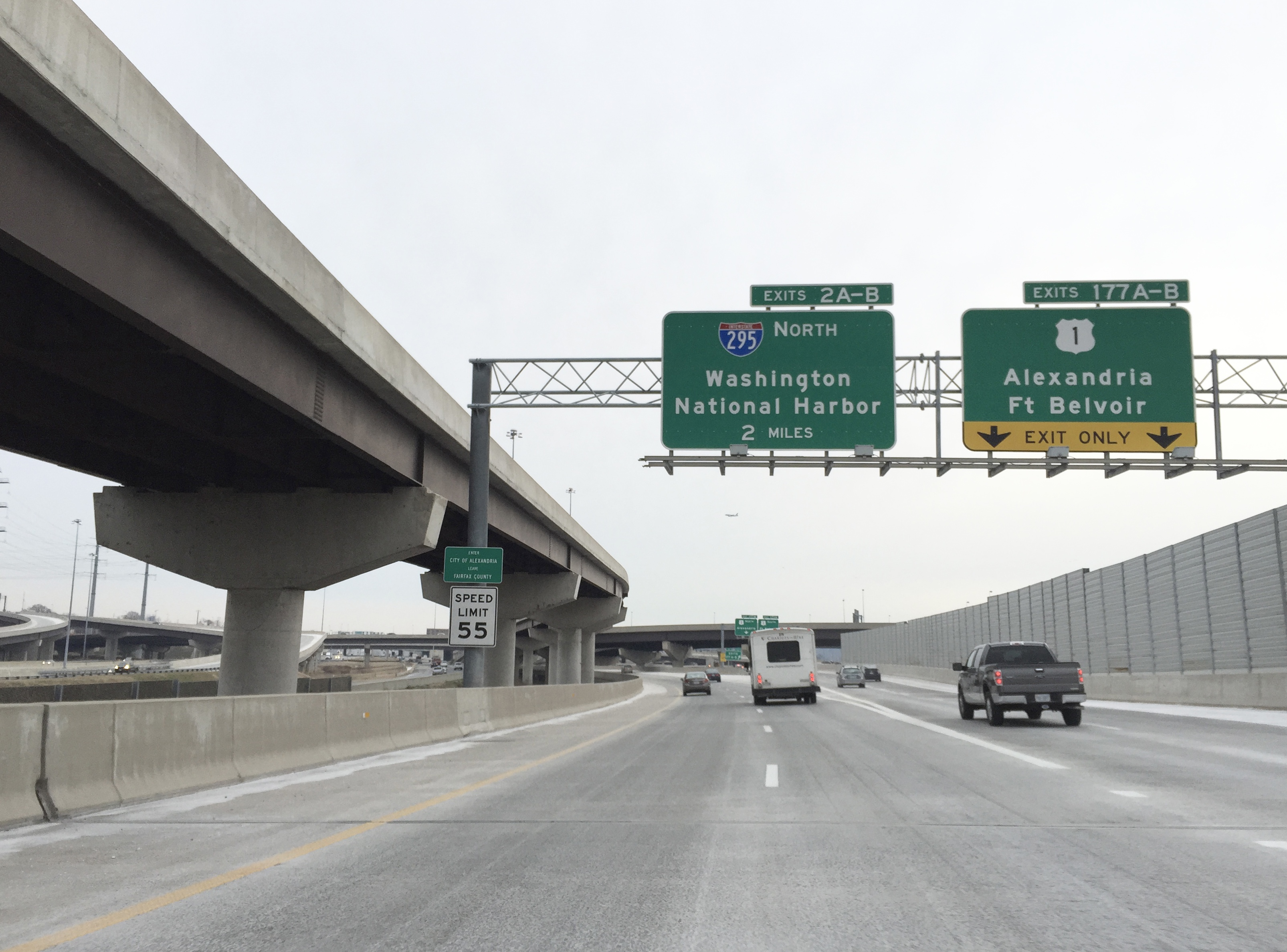
Most speed limits in the US use United States customary units, with the highway signs matching the Manual on Uniform Traffic Control Devices.

Imperial measurements reminder in Northern Ireland when entering from the Republic

Road sign used in British Columbia, Canada, near the Canada–US border to remind American drivers that Canada uses the metric system.

- All main countries/regions, except for the United States and the United Kingdom, use the metric system. Some mark this fact by using units on various signs. Note that some smaller English-speaking countries in the Caribbean also use miles per hour.
  - Advisory speed limit signs in most countries list units, although New Zealand does not. The US lists units in mph.
  - Height, weight, and width restrictions are almost always accompanied by units (tonnes or metres); in the US, the short ton is used with no distinction from metric tonnes.
  - Signs in some parts of Canada near the US border often include both metric and Imperial units, to remind American drivers that they are entering metric countries. No such equivalent exists in the US.
- The US was, at one time, planning a transition to the metric system. The Metric Conversion Act of 1975 started the process, but the abolition of the United States Metric Board in 1982 significantly hampered conversion. Nevertheless, the MUTCD specifies metric versions of speed limit signs. Furthermore, Interstate 19 in Arizona is partially signed in metric.

=== Color differences ===
==== Warning signs ====
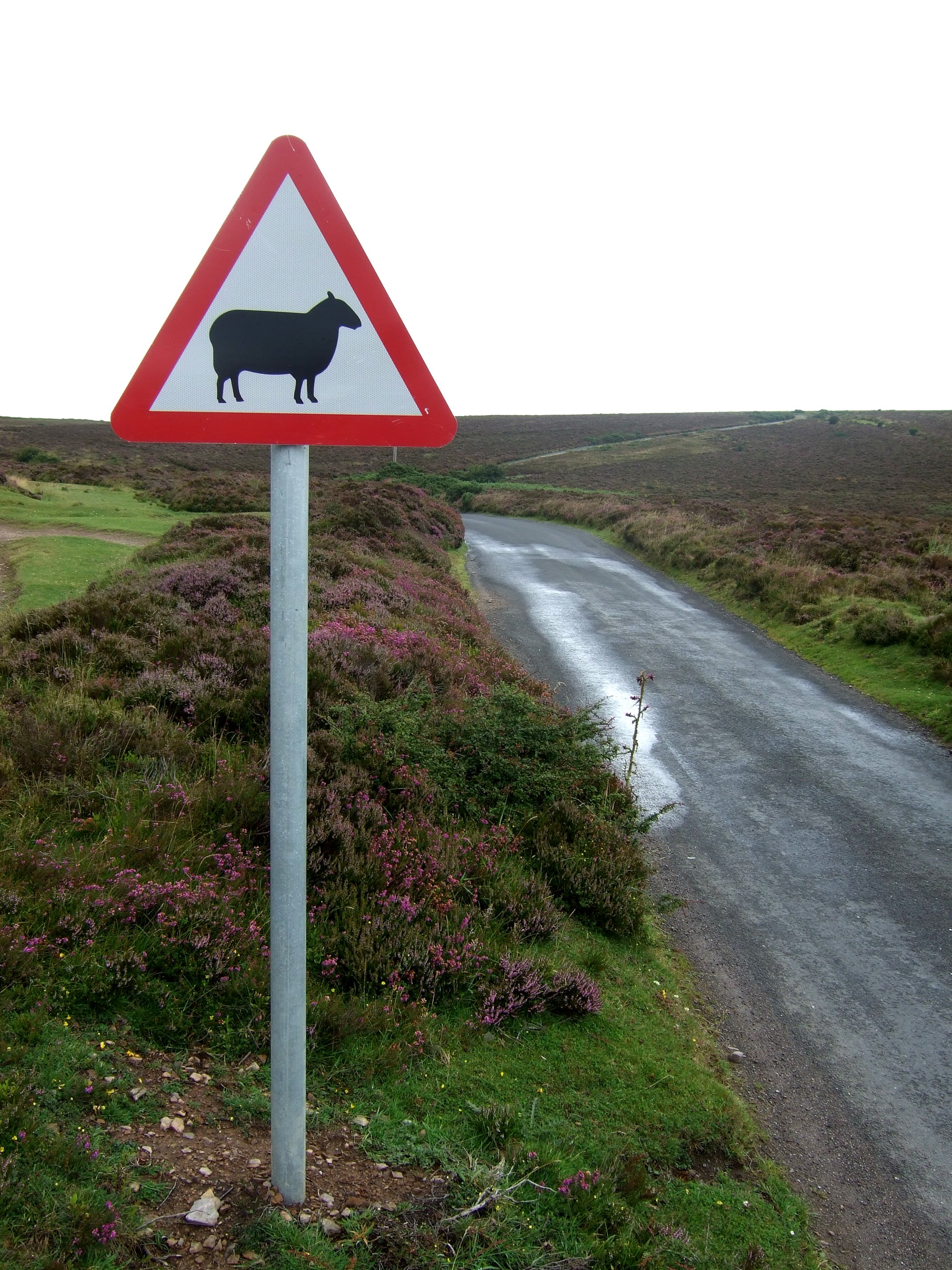
Sheep road sign in the United Kingdom.

Countries in yellow use MUTCD-style diamond warning signs. Click for large image and detailed info key.

- Most warning signs are diamond-shaped and yellow or red-bordered triangular warning signs; some warning signs may be fluorescent yellow-green in order to draw extra attention. There are a few exceptions to this:
  - Pentagonal signs are used in school zones in the United States, Liberia, and many areas in Canada. In the Philippines, pentagonal signs are permanently used for pedestrian crossings.
- Warning signs may be text-only.

==== Road works and construction ====
- Most countries use orange or yellow diamond-shaped signs or yellow, orange or white red-bordered triangular warning signs for construction zones. Australia and the Philippines use rectangular signs that fit into temporary casings.

==== Regulatory signs ====
- Prohibitory and restrictive signs are classified as regulatory signs.
- Almost all prohibitory signs use a red circle with a slash. Restrictive signs typically use a red circle, as in Europe. Some may be seated on a rectangular white background.
  - The original MUTCD prohibitory and restrictive signs were text-only (i.e. NO LEFT TURN). Some of these signs continue to be used in the US.
- Yield signs can be blank or have text with the legend "YIELD" or "GIVE WAY" depending on which country it is.
- The No Entry / Do Not Enter sign may or may not feature text. In Ireland, an upwards-pointing arrow contained within a slashed red circle is used instead. Some countries have those two signs separated.
  - The Latin American-style do not proceed straight sign may take a different meaning in countries with standard No Entry signs. Typically, it indicates an intersection where traffic cannot continue straight ahead, but where cross-traffic may enter the street from the right (or left). Thus, it is distinguished from a No Entry (for all vehicles) sign.

==== Mandatory or permitted-action signs ====
Various color schemes for mandatory signs. Click for large image and detailed info key.

- The design of mandatory signs varies widely, since the MUTCD does not specify their use. Rather, the MUTCD's equivalent are classified as regulatory signs.
  - Some countries use simple arrows with the text "ONLY" or its equivalent underneath. This is the US and Australian standard.
  - Some countries use European-style white-on-blue circular signs. These are "Type A Mandatory Signs" as prescribed by the Vienna Convention.
  - Some Latin American and Caribbean countries use red-bordered circular signs, in the same style as regulatory signs. These are "Type B Mandatory Signs" as prescribed by the Vienna Convention. In cases relating to particular types of vehicle traffic (e.g. buses), these signs are identical to some European prohibitory signs. (Note: Compare Bicycles Only (Ciclovia) sign in Jamaica: with No Bicycles sign in Continental Europe:)
  - Canada uses a unique style of mandatory sign that features a green circle.

== Table ==
=== Warning ===
	Australia	Canada	Hong Kong	Ireland	Jamaica	Liberia	Mauritius	New Zealand	Nigeria	Philippines	SADC (Southern African Development Community)	Malta	Singapore	Uganda	United Kingdom	United States
Stop sign ahead																
Yield / Give Way sign ahead																
Traffic signals ahead																
Roundabout ahead																
Two-way traffic ahead									or or or							
Uncontrolled railroad crossing ahead			Not used					or	(If controlled by stop sign)			No railways	Not used (Note: The last level crossing in Singapore closed in 2011, and thus train-related traffic signs became obsolete.)			
Level railroad crossing with barriers ahead				or								No railways	Not used			
Tram / streetcar crossing		Not used			Not used (Note: There are no operating tram or streetcar systems in this jurisdiction.)	Not used				Not used		No trams	Not used			
Railroad crossbuck	or			Not used								No railways	Not used			
Level crossing (multiple tracks)	or		Not used	Not used	Not used	Not used		or		Not used		No railways	Not used	Not used	No longer used since 1994	
Crossroads ahead											or (Note: Signs below used for crossroads with priority.) or (Note: The sign below is a uniquely Tanzanian version of the sign above.)					
Junction with a side road ahead																
Traffic merges ahead																
Staggered crossroads ahead											or (Note: The sign below is a uniquely Tanzanian version of the sign above.)					
Added lane				Not used (Note: Similar signs exist as indication signs (signs F-300 – F-308).)												
Divided highway ahead																
Divided highway ends																
Lane ends ahead																
Road narrows ahead																or (Note: Used only in New York.)
Narrow bridge ahead			Not used	Not used												
Dangerous crosswinds			Not used							Not used			Not used			
Low-flying aircraft								or							or	
Steep hill downwards								or		and						
Steep hill upwards								or		and						
Uneven surface																
Bump in road						or										
Dip in road			Not used										Not used			
Ford			Not used		or											
Snow / ice			Not used													
Fog	Not used			Not used												
Slippery road surface																
Loose road surface	(Note: Temporary use only.)															
Dangerous shoulder	Not used		Not used													
Pavement ends			Not used	Not used												
Gentle curve ahead			Not used													
Sharp curve ahead																
Double gentle curve ahead			Not used	Not used												
Double sharp curve ahead										(Note: Described by the DPWH as a "reverse turn" sign.)						
Series of curves ahead			Not used								or or or					
Hairpin curve ahead			Not used	Not used (Note: Unofficial versions exist.)												
Loop curve ahead			Not used													
Chevron (short turn)			Not used													
Chevron (sharp turn)																
School zone	or (Note: Top sign used in Victoria. Middle-top sign used in New South Wales. Middle-bottom sign used in Queensland.) or or									(Note: Described by the DPWH as a "school children crossing" sign.)	(Note: This is combination advance warning sign (W308 "children") with a supplementary plate (IN11.4), commonly used to warn of school zones in South Africa. There is also a W305 "scholar patrol" warning for guarded pedestrian crossings:)					or
Children / playground ahead	or				or											
Pedestrian crossing ahead								or								
Pedestrian crossing				or		or										
Disabled / elderly pedestrian crossing	or	or	or	Not used									or			
Domesticated animals											or or				or	
Wild animals										Not used	or or or				or or	
Cyclists crossing																
Equestrians			Not used							Not used						
Emergency vehicles			Not used	Not used						Not used						
Farm vehicles			Not used							Not used						or
Falling rocks or debris																or (Note: Used only in California.)
Opening or swing bridge			Not used					Not used					Not used			
Quay or riverbank	Not used														or	
Tunnel ahead	Not used															
Height restriction ahead															or or	
Width restriction ahead	Not used		Not used					Not used								
Length restriction ahead	Not used		Not used													
Weight restriction ahead	Not used		Not used					Not used								
Roadworks										Not used						
Flagman ahead			Not used													
Traffic congestion																
Other danger	Not used															

=== Regulatory ===
==== Priority ====
	Australia	Canada	Hong Kong	Ireland	Jamaica	Liberia	Mauritius	New Zealand	Nigeria	Philippines	SADC	Malta	Singapore	Uganda	United Kingdom	United States
Stop																
Yield / Give Way				or											or	
Yield to oncoming traffic			Not used	Not used												
Priority over oncoming traffic	Not used		Not used	Not used												
Priority road	Not used		Not used	Not used												
End of priority road	Not used		Not used	Not used												

==== Prohibitory signs ====
	Australia	Canada	Hong Kong	Ireland	Jamaica	Liberia	Mauritius	New Zealand	Nigeria	Philippines	SADC	Malta	Singapore	Uganda	United Kingdom	United States
No entry	or (Note: Top sign used in Queensland, South Australia, Tasmania, Victoria, and Western Australia. Bottom sign used in the Australian Capital Territory, New South Wales, and the Northern Territory.)			or		or			or							
Road closed	or															
No motor vehicles	Not used			Not used									Not used			
No motorcycles	Not used			Not used												
No mopeds	Not used		Not used	Not used												
No bicycles																
No pedestrians																or
No heavy goods vehicles											or					or
No buses				Not used												
No trailers	Not used		Not used	Not used	or	or										
No farm vehicles	Not used		Not used	Not used												
No animal-drawn vehicles	Not used		Not used													
No vehicles carrying dangerous goods	Not used			Not used												
No vehicles carrying explosives or inflammables	Not used		Not used													
No vehicles carrying water pollutants	Not used		Not used	Not used												
No handcarts	Not used			Not used												
Maximum speed limit						or										
Speed restriction ends			Not used	Not used							Not used					
Maximum height																
Maximum width	Not used							Not used								Not used
Maximum length																
Maximum weight																
Maximum weight per axle									or							
No left turn	or									or	or	Not used				
No right turn	or									or	or	Not used				
No U-turn	or									or			Not used (Note: In Singapore, U-turns are forbidden per default, unless specifically allowed by a sign. While unofficial "U-turn prohibited" signs do exist, they only serve as a reminder, and the prohibition would still have been in place without the sign.)			
No overtaking																and
Minimum following distance between vehicles	(Note: Used in Queensland, New South Wales, Victoria and the Australian Capital Territory.)		Not used	Not used												
No honking	Not used			Not used												
No parking									or (No standing)							
No stopping	or (Note: Top sign used everywhere but New South Wales. Bottom sign used only in New South Wales.)															

==== Mandatory or permitted actions ====
Mandatory signs indicating an obligation to turn left do exist, but are not included in the list below since they are functionally mirror versions of signs indicating an obligation to turn right.

	Australia	Canada	Hong Kong	Ireland	Jamaica	Liberia	Mauritius	New Zealand	Nigeria	Philippines	SADC	Malta	Singapore	Uganda	United Kingdom	United States
Proceed straight (no turns)																
Turn right	Not used							Not used								
Turn right ahead																
Proceed straight or turn right	Not used		Not used	Not used						Not used						
Keep right (or left)																or
Pass on either side																or (Note: Used only in New York.)
Route for heavy goods vehicles and vehicles carrying dangerous goods	Not used		Not used													and
Roundabout			Not used	(Note: Mini-roundabouts only.)												or
Minimum speed limit	Not used		Not used	Not used				Not used								
Seatbelts required	Not used		Not used	Not used												
Living street	Not used		Not used													
Overtaking permitted (Note: In many jurisdictions, "Overtaking Permitted" is indicated solely through a change in road markings, e.g. a solid center line changing to a dashed center line. In such jurisdictions, signs in this category are only posted in locations where a change in road markings is deemed insufficient notice for drivers. This is in contrast to "No Overtaking" signs, which are almost always posted alongside changes in road markings to indicate the end of an overtaking zone.)				Not used						Not used						
Shared use path				or or		or			or	Not used	or				or or	
Bicycles only																
Transit only				Not used												
Equestrians only	Not used		Not used	Not used												

=== Other ===
	Australia	Canada	Hong Kong	Ireland	Jamaica	Liberia	Mauritius	New Zealand	Nigeria	Philippines	SADC	Malta	Singapore	Uganda	United Kingdom	United States
Speed camera	or															
One-way street									or							or
Two-way traffic			Not used					Not used			Not used					
Dead end		or														or
Parking zone		or		or (Note: The circular sign is used to indicate on-street parking, while the square-shaped sign indicates off-street parking.)												
Taxi stand								or								
Hospital											(Note: Pictographic symbol for use on guidance signs and supplementary plates; seldom a sign in its own right)				or	
Bus lane																
Bus stop			and	or												
Train station																
Airport									or							
Electric vehicle charging station			Not used	or												
Freeway begins	or or							or								
Freeway ends	or or							or								
Customs post	(Note: Australia has no land borders. The sign is used when interstate borders are closed (eg during COVID-19 restrictions).)			(Note: For ferry terminals and ports only.)												Not used
National highway shield(s)																
National border signs or speed limits	Not used			Not used	Not used		Not used	Not used		Not used	-	Not used				varies

== See also ==
- Comparison of European road signs
- Comparison of MUTCD-influenced traffic signs
- Glossary of road transport terms
- Manual on Uniform Traffic Control Devices
- Traffic sign
- Vienna Convention on Road Signs and Signals
