= Comparison of MUTCD-influenced traffic signs =

Map showing world adoption of the MUTCD Adopted national MUTCD Adopted national MUTCD with state supplement Adopted state-specific MUTCD Adopted a country-specific equivalent to the MUTCD Adopted a mixture of the Vienna Convention and MUTCD

Road signs used by countries in the Americas are significantly influenced by the Manual on Uniform Traffic Control Devices (MUTCD), first released in 1935, reflecting the influence of the United States throughout the region. Other non-American countries using road signs similar to the MUTCD include Australia, Indonesia, Ireland, Japan, Malaysia, New Zealand, and Thailand. They, along with the US Virgin Islands, are also the only countries listed here which drive on the left—with the exception of Liberia and the Philippines (though partial), both of which drive on the right.

There are also a number of American signatories to the Vienna Convention on Road Signs and Signals: Brazil, Chile, Costa Rica, Cuba, Ecuador, French Guiana, Guyana, Mexico, and Venezuela. Of these, only Chile, Cuba, and Guyana have actually ratified the treaty.

Mandatory action signs in the Americas tend to be influenced by both systems. Nearly all countries in the Americas use yellow diamond warning signs. Recognizing the differences in standards across Europe and the Americas, the Vienna convention considers these types of signs an acceptable alternative to the triangular warning sign. However, UN compliant signs must make use of more pictograms in contrast to more text based US variants. Indeed, most American nations make use of more symbols than allowed in the US MUTCD.

Unlike in Europe, considerable variation within road sign designs can exist within nations, especially in multilingual areas.

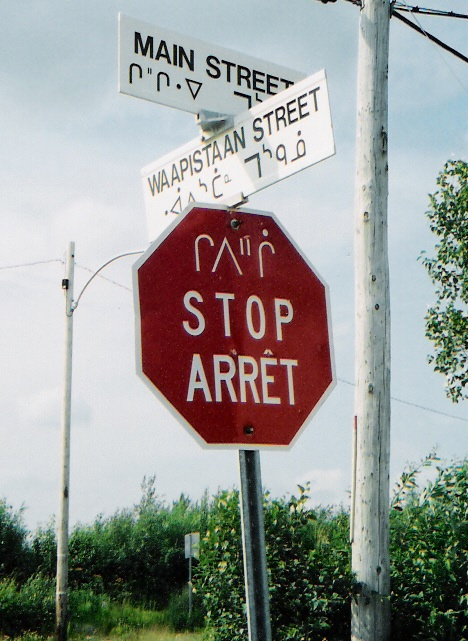
Trilingual stop sign in Mistissini, Quebec, Canada. Languages are Cree, English, and French.

== Differences between MUTCD-influenced traffic signs ==
The main differences between traffic signs influenced by the MUTCD relate to:

- Graphic design and symbological details
- The use of square-bordered or circular regulatory signs
- Local languages (signs may be bilingual or trilingual)
  - Most notable is the text on stop signs. Unlike in Europe, the text on stop signs in the Americas varies depending on language, and may be multilingual.

=== Languages ===
Below is a table of the main languages used. (In non-English speaking countries, English is frequently included on signs near airports and tourist areas.)

| | República Argentina | Commonwealth of Australia | República Federativa do Brasil | ព្រះរាជាណាចក្រកម្ពុជា | Canada | | República de Chile | República de Colombia | República del Ecuador | Republik Indonesia | Republic of Ireland | Jamaica | 日本国 | Republic of Liberia | Malaysia | Estados Unidos Mexicanos | New Zealand | República de Panamá | República del Perú | Republic of the Philippines | Sistema de la Integración Centroamericana | ราชอาณาจักรไทย | United States of America | República Oriental del Uruguay |
| | Argentina | Australia | Brazil | Cambodia | Anglophone Canada | Quebec | Chile | Colombia | Ecuador | Indonesia | Ireland | Jamaica | Japan | Liberia | Malaysia | Mexico | New Zealand | Panama | Peru | Philippines | SICA | Thailand | United States | Uruguay |
|---|---|---|---|---|---|---|---|---|---|---|---|---|---|---|---|---|---|---|---|---|---|---|---|---|
| Drives on the… | Right | Left | Right | | | | | | | Left | | | | Right | Left | Right | Left | Right | | | | Left | Right | |
| Primary language | Spanish | English | Portuguese | Khmer | English | French | Spanish | Spanish | Spanish | Indonesian | Irish and English | English | Japanese | English | Malay | Spanish | English | Spanish | | English | Spanish | Thai | English | Spanish |
| Secondary language(s) | | | | * English | * French; Alongside English in New Brunswick and other Francophone regions, as well as on federally administered land.: Indigenous languages On Indian reserves and some majority-Native-inhabited lands. | * Indigenous languages On Indian reserves and some majority-Native-inhabited lands.: English Rare; used in Anglophone regions e.g. Montreal West and Nunavik. | | | | * Indigenous languages Rare; used on guide signs around popular tourist areas.: English On guide signs around popular tourist areas. | | | * English; Especially on guide signs. | | * English; Used on guide signs around popular tourist areas, eg. Genting Highlands and Desaru. * Chinese/Tamil; Used on guide signs around Genting Highlands. | | * Māori; Used for bilingual place names, as defined by the New Zealand Geographic Board. | | | * Filipino | | | * Indigenous languages On some native reservations.: Spanish In Puerto Rico. | |
| Typical typeface(s) | FHWA (modified) | FHWA | Clearview, formerly FHWA | Helvetica (English) | Clearview, FHWA (varies by province) | FHWA, Clearview (different fonts specified for different signs) | Ruta CL, formerly FHWA | FHWA (modified) | FHWA (modified) | Clearview, formerly FHWA | Transport | FHWA | Hiragino (Japanese) & Vialog (English), formerly Helvetica (English) | Clearview, formerly FHWA | LLM (for expressways) and Transport (for federal & state highways), formerly FHWA | Tipografía México, formerly FHWA | FHWA | FHWA | FHWA (modified) | Clearview, formerly FHWA (still used on expressway sections) | FHWA (modified) | FHWA (English) | FHWA, Clearview (varies by state) | FHWA |

=== Differences in units ===
Road sign used in British Columbia, Canada, near the Canada–US border to remind US drivers that Canada uses the metric system.

Metric signage reminder in Quebec, Canada often found after ports of entry from the US.

Sign at the Republic of Ireland–United Kingdom border indicating that limits in the Republic are shown in km/h.

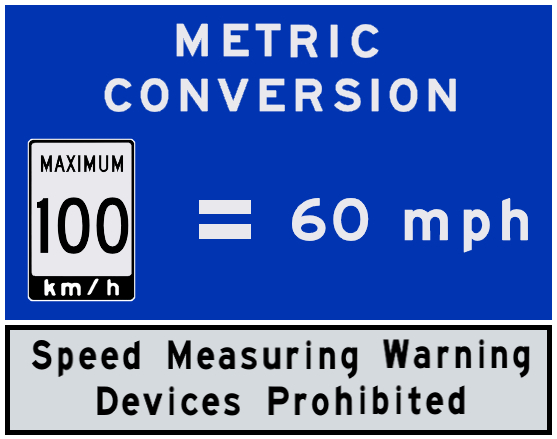
Blue metric conversion reminder sign used in Ontario, Canada near the US border.

- All countries, with the exception of the United States and the United Kingdom, use the metric system. Some countries mark this fact by using units on various signs.
  - Brazil, Indonesia, Ireland, Mexico, Panama, Peru, and parts of Canada (British Columbia, parts of Ontario, and Yukon) list units (km/h) on their maximum speed limit.
  - In Canada and Ireland, this is a reflection of a (somewhat) recent transition from imperial to metric, which first took effect in Canada, starting on 1 April 1971, but its speed limit conversion didn't take full effect until September 1977. Meanwhile, in Ireland, its recent speed limit transition from miles per hour to kilometres per hour didn't take effect until 20 January 2005, although distance road signs had already been labelled in metric since the 1970s.
  - The US territory of Puerto Rico uses a mix – speed limits are in mph but distance signs are marked in km.
  - Advisory speed limit signs in most countries list units, although New Zealand does not. The US lists units in mph.
  - Height, weight, and width restrictions are almost always accompanied by units (tonnes or metres); in the US, the short ton is used with no distinction from metric tonnes.
  - Signs in some parts of Canada and Mexico near the US border often include both metric and Imperial units, to remind US drivers that they are entering metric countries. In Canada, these signs display the imperial speed limit using a Canadian-style sign, rather than an MUTCD-standard used in the US. No such equivalent exists in the US.
- The US was, at one time, planning a transition to the metric system. The Metric Conversion Act of 1975 started the process, but it was halted in 1982. The MUTCD has guidelines for posting metric versions of speed limit signs on roads.
- The SI standard unit of speed, meter per second, is not used on road signs anywhere in the world. All countries that use the metric system measure speeds in kilometers per hour.

=== Color differences ===
==== Warning signs ====
Countries in yellow use MUTCD-style diamond warning signs. See image description page for large image and legend.

- Nearly all MUTCD-influenced warning signs are diamond-shaped and yellow; some warning signs may be fluorescent yellow-green to draw extra attention. There are a few exceptions to this:
  - Pentagonal signs are used in school zones in the United States, Liberia, Colombia, Mexico, Malaysia and many areas in Canada. In Japan and the Philippines, pentagonal signs are permanently used for pedestrian crossings.
  - Argentina employs European-style red-bordered triangular warning signs in certain instances where extra attention is required. The Philippines, Taiwan and Vietnam uses this style for most warning signs, though some highways like the Subic–Clark–Tarlac Expressway and the Manila–Cavite Expressway use MUTCD-style yellow diamond-shaped warning signs.
- Warning signs may be text-only.

==== Road works and construction ====
- Most countries use orange diamond-shaped signs for construction zones. Australia, Cambodia, the Philippines, and sometimes Canada instead use rectangular signs that fit into temporary casings. Warnings for construction zones, however, are not marked at all in Japan and are always yellow.
- In the USA, Canada, Australia, Thailand, Taiwan, and the Philippines the temporary Road Closed sign is instead always a rectangular sign that can either be used as a standalone or fit into a temporary casing.

==== Regulatory signs ====
- Prohibitory and restrictive signs are classified as regulatory signs, as per the MUTCD.
- Almost all prohibitory signs use a red circle with a slash. Restrictive signs typically use a red circle, as in Europe. Some may be seated on a rectangular white background.
  - The original MUTCD prohibitory and restrictive signs were text-only (i.e. NO LEFT TURN). Some of these signs continue to be used in the US.
- The No Entry / Do Not Enter sign may or may not feature text. In some Latin American countries, an upwards-pointing arrow contained within a slashed red circle is used instead. Some countries have those two signs separated.
  - The Latin American-style 'do not proceed straight' sign may take a different meaning in countries with standard No Entry / Do Not Enter signs. Typically, it indicates an intersection where traffic cannot continue straight ahead (often involving a one-way street to be exact), but where cross-traffic may enter the street from the right (or left). Thus, it is distinguished from a No Entry / Do Not Enter (for all vehicles) sign.

===== Mandatory or permitted-action signs =====
Various color schemes for mandatory signs. See image description page for large image and legend.

- The design of mandatory signs varies widely, since the MUTCD does not specify their use. Rather, the MUTCD's equivalent are classified as regulatory signs.
  - Some countries use simple arrows with the text "ONLY" or its equivalent underneath. This is the MUTCD standard.
  - Some countries use European-style white-on-blue circular signs. These are "Type A Mandatory Signs" as prescribed by the Vienna Convention.
  - Some Latin American countries (and formerly Ireland and Thailand) use red-bordered circular signs, in the same style as regulatory signs. These are "Type B Mandatory Signs" as prescribed by the Vienna Convention. In cases relating to particular types of vehicle traffic (e.g. buses), these signs are identical to some European prohibitory signs. (Note: Compare Bicycles Only (Ciclovia) sign in Brazil, Colombia, Jamaica, Uruguay: with No Bicycles sign in Continental Europe:)
  - Canada uses a unique style of mandatory sign that features a green circle.

==== Highway and wayfinding signs ====
- Most countries use white-on-green signs on highways and to indicate location, direction, freeway name, exit numbers, etc.
  - The exact style of these signs varies widely, although many are influenced by the MUTCD standard.
  - Chile, Ireland, Japan, and New Zealand use both white-on-green and white-on-blue guide signs, as does the Northwest Territories and Ontario in Canada. Parts of Australia use yellow-on-blue guide signs for certain road classes.
  - Malaysia uses both black-on-yellow and white-on-green guide signs.
  - White-on-blue signs are sometimes used at airports and for rest areas.
  - White-on-brown signs are sometimes used to indicate park areas.

=== Gallery of guide signs ===
Argentina

Australia (Queensland)

Brazil (São Paulo)

Cambodia

Canada (British Columbia)

Canada (Ontario)

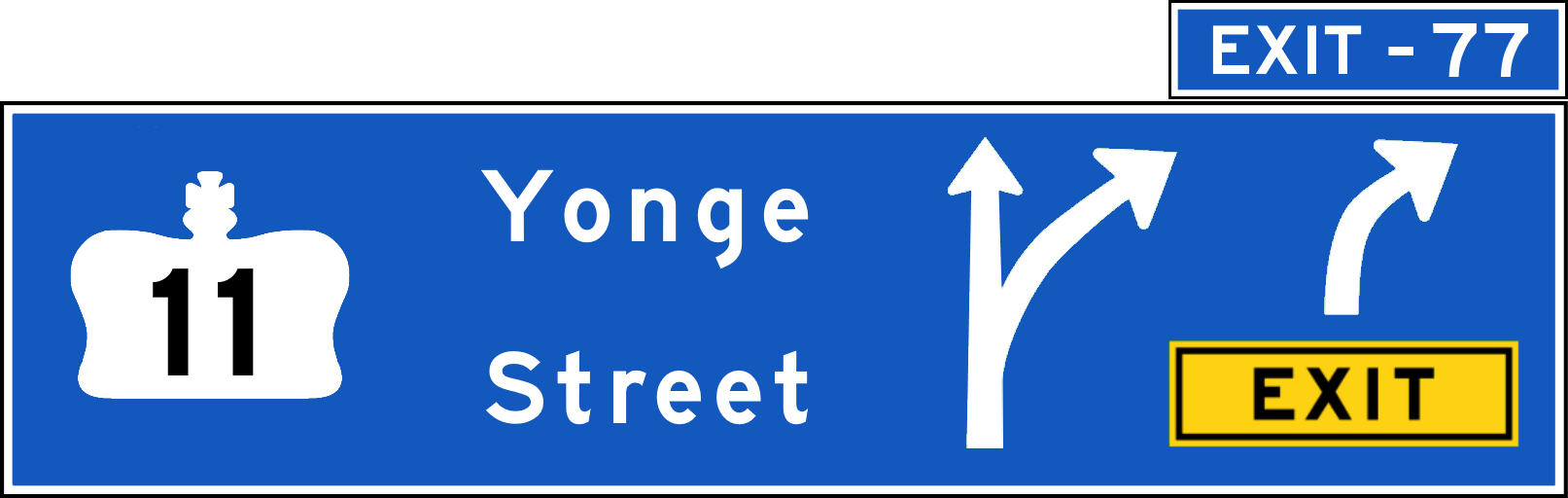
Canada (Ontario) Hwy Toll Blue Signage

Canada (Quebec)

Chile

Colombia

Ecuador

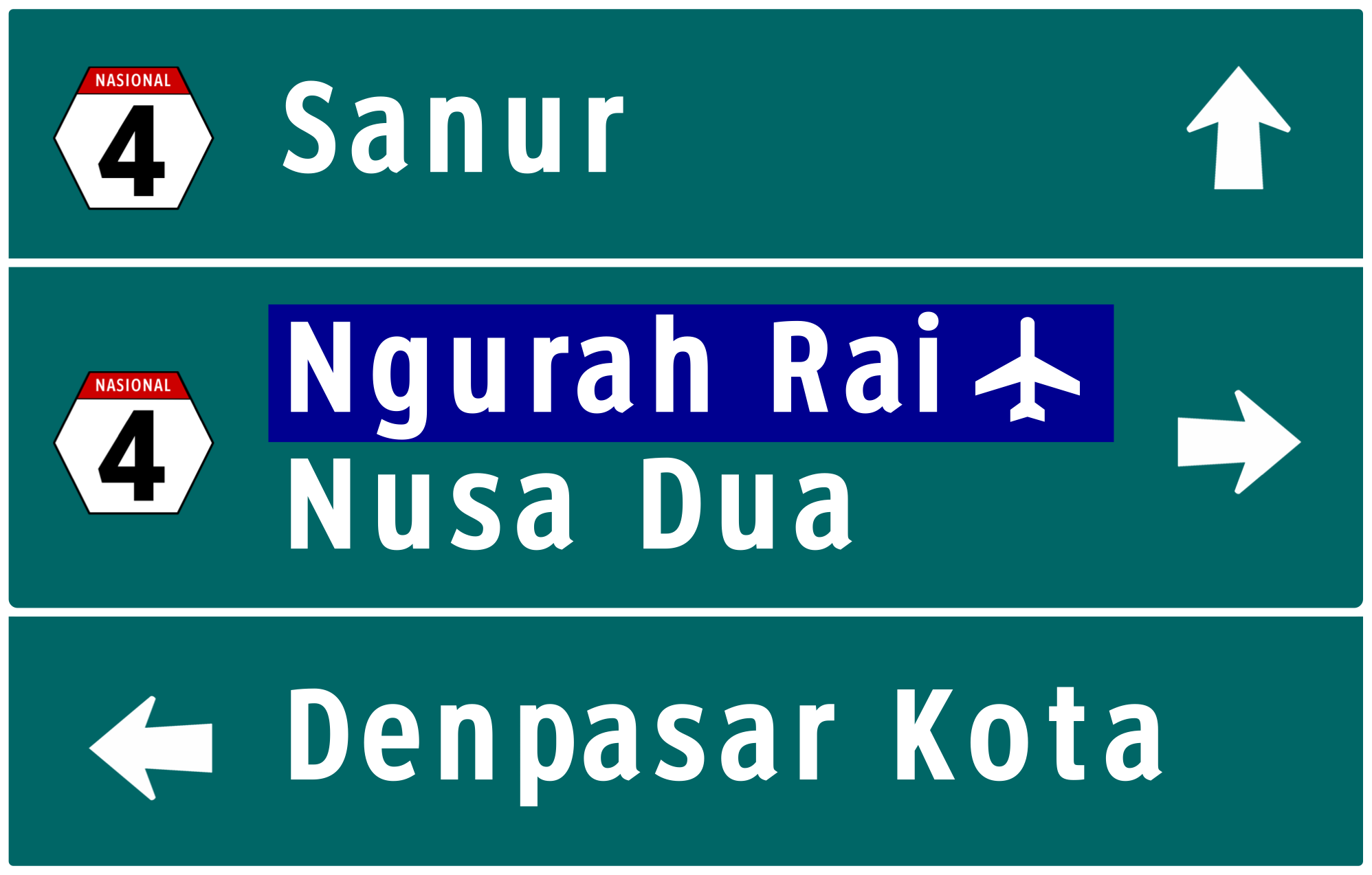
Indonesia

Ireland

Japan

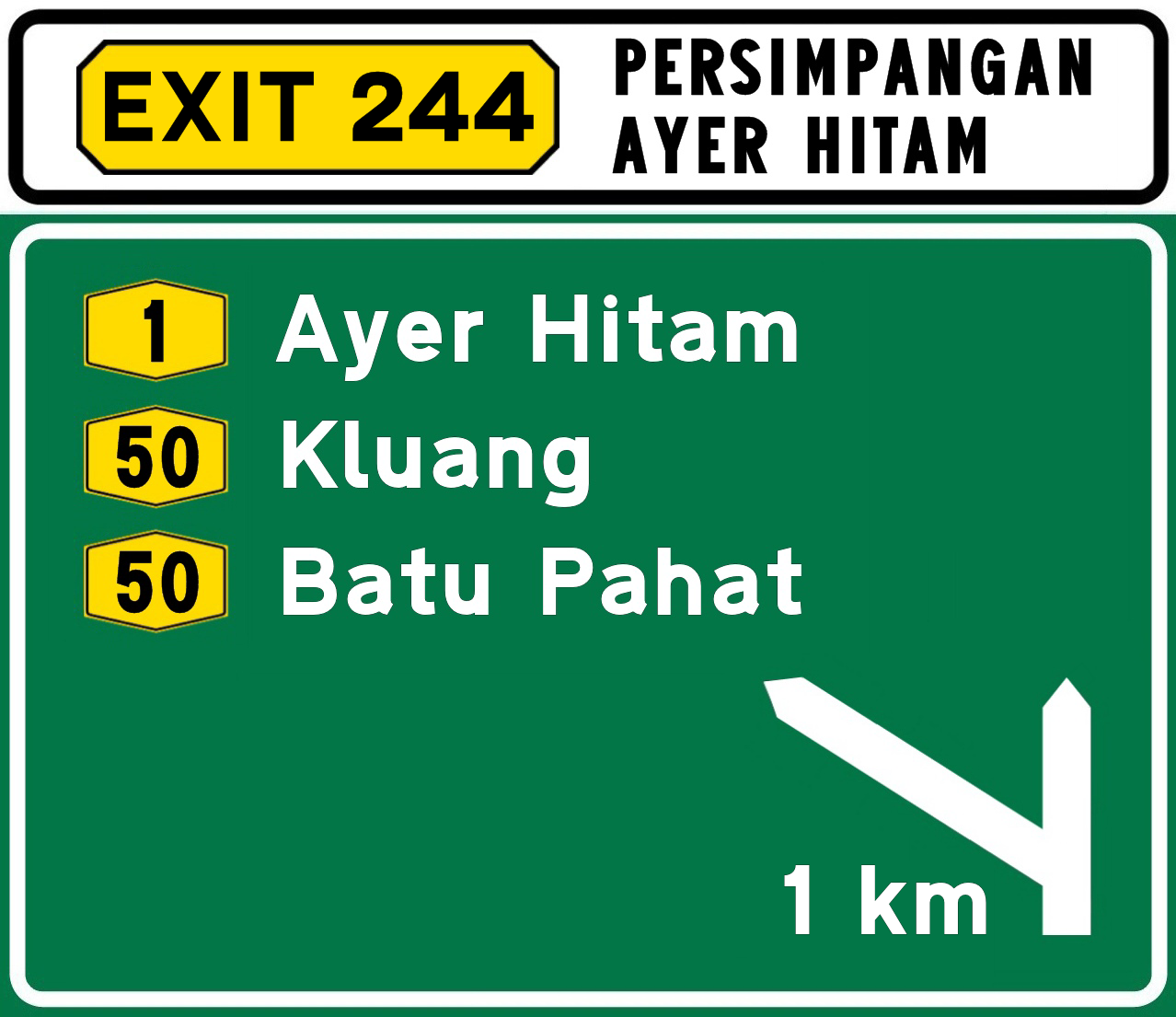
Malaysia

Mexico

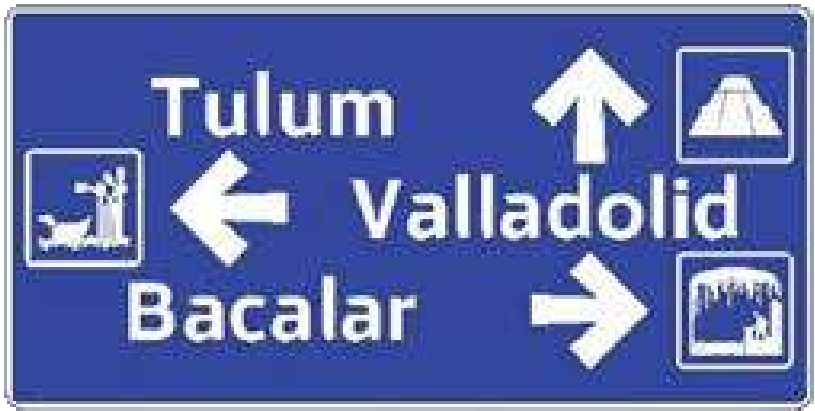
Mexico (touristic)

New Zealand

Panama

Peru

Philippines

Thailand

United States (New Jersey)

== Table of traffic signs comparison ==
=== Warning ===
| | Argentina | Australia | Brazil | Cambodia | Canada | Canada - British Columbia | Canada - Ontario | Canada - Quebec | Chile | Colombia | Ecuador | Indonesia | Ireland | Jamaica | Japan | Liberia | Malaysia | Mexico | New Zealand | Panama | Peru | Philippines | Thailand | United States | Uruguay |
|---|---|---|---|---|---|---|---|---|---|---|---|---|---|---|---|---|---|---|---|---|---|---|---|---|---|
| Stop sign ahead | | | | | | | | | | | | ? | | | Not used | | | | | | | | | | |
| Yield / Give Way sign ahead | | | Not used | | | | | | | | | ? | | | Not used | | | | | | | | | | ? |
| Traffic signals ahead | | | | | | | | | | | | | | | | | | | | | | | | | |
| Roundabout ahead | | | | | | | | | | | | | | | | | | | | | | | | (Note: In the US, "roundabout" and "traffic circle" are used interchangeably, along with "rotary". See Roundabout terminology.) | |
| Two-way traffic ahead | | | | | | | | | | | | | | | | | | | | | | | | | |
| Uncontrolled railroad crossing ahead | | | | | | | | | | | | | | | | | | | | | | | | | |
| Level railroad crossing with barriers ahead | (Note: No distinction between controlled and uncontrolled railroad crossings is made.) | | | | | | | | | | | | or | | | | | | | or | | | | | |
| Tram / streetcar crossing | | | | Not used (Note: There are no operating tram or streetcar systems in this jurisdiction.) | Not used | Not used | Not used | Not used | Not used | Not used | (Note: Only used in the Cuenca Tramway, see this photo. The design of a tram road sign is the same as in Spain.) | Not used | | Not used | | Not used | Not used | Not used | | Not used | Not used | Not used | Not used | (Note: Used in California only. Shared grade tram or streetcar crossings are typically unsigned in other jurisdictions.) | |
| Railroad crossbuck | | or | | | | | | | | | | | Not used | | | | | | or | | | or | | | |
| Level crossing (multiple tracks) | | or | | | | | | | | | ? | | Not used | ? | Not used | | Not used | Not used | or | Not used | | Not used | ? | | Not used |
| | Argentina | Australia | Brazil | Cambodia | Canada | Canada (British Columbia) | Canada (Ontario) | Canada (Quebec) | Chile | Colombia | Ecuador | Indonesia | Ireland | Jamaica | Japan | Liberia | Malaysia | Mexico | New Zealand | Panama | Peru | Philippines | Thailand | United States | Uruguay |
| Crossroads ahead | | | | | | | | | | | | | | | | | | | | | | | | | |
| Junction with a side road ahead | | | | | | | | | | | | | | | | | | | | | | | | | |
| Traffic merges ahead | | | | ? | or | | | | | | | | | ? | | | | | | | | | | | |
| Staggered crossroads ahead | ? | | | | ? | | ? | ? | | | | | | ? | ? | | | | ? | | ? | | | | |
| Added lane | ? | | ? | ? | | | ? | | ? | ? | | Not used | Not used (Note: Similar signs exist as indication signs (signs F-300 – F-308).) | ? | ? | ? | ? | ? | | ? | ? | ? | ? | | ? |
| Divided highway ahead | | | | | | | | | ? | | | | | | Not used | | | | ? | | | | | | |
| Divided highway ends | | | | | | | | | ? | | | | | | Not used | | | | ? | | | | | | |
| Lane ends ahead | | | | | | | | | | | | | | | | | | | | | | | | | |
| Road narrows ahead | | | | | | | | | | | | | | | | | | | | | | | | or | |
| Narrow bridge ahead | | | | ? | | | | | | | | | Not used | | Not used | | | | | | | | | | |
| Dangerous crosswinds | | | | | | | ? | | | | | | | | | | | | | ? | ? | Not used | ? | (Note: Text varies.) | |
| Low-flying aircraft | | | | | | | ? | | | ? | | | | | Not used | | ? | Not used | | | | | | | |
| Steep hill downwards | | | | | | | | | | | | | | | | | | and | | | | and | | | |
| Steep hill upwards | | | | | | | Not used | (Note: Not in use for road vehicles.) | | | | | | | | | | and | | | Not used | and | | | |
| | Argentina | Australia | Brazil | Cambodia | Canada | Canada (British Columbia) | Canada (Ontario) | Canada (Quebec) | Chile | Colombia | Ecuador | Indonesia | Ireland | Jamaica | Japan | Liberia | Malaysia | Mexico | New Zealand | Panama | Peru | Philippines | Thailand | United States | Uruguay |
| Uneven surface | | | | | | | | | | | | | | | | | | Not used | | | | | | | |
| Bump in road | | | | | | | | | | | | | | | | or | | | | | | | | | |
| Dip in road | | | | ? | | | ? | (Note: Off-road tracks only.) | | | | | | | Not used | | Not used | ? | | | | ? | | | |
| Ford | ? | | ? | ? | | | | | ? | ? | ? | ? | | or | ? | ? | ? | | | ? | ? | | ? | | ? |
| Snow / ice | ? | | ? | ? | ? | ? | ? | ? | ? | ? | ? | ? | | ? | ? | | ? | | ? | ? | ? | ? | ? | or (Note: Used only in California.) | ? |
| Fog | ? | Not used | ? | ? | ? | | ? | | ? | ? | ? | | Not used | ? | ? | | | | ? | ? | ? | ? | ? | | ? |
| Slippery road surface | | | | | | | | | | | | | | | | | | and | | | | | | | |
| Loose road surface | | (Note: Temporary use only.) | | or | | | Not used | | | | | | | | Not used | | Not used | | | | | ? | | | |
| Dangerous shoulder | ? | Not used | ? | ? | | | | | | | ? | | | ? | ? | | | ? | ? | ? | ? | ? | ? | | ? |
| Pavement ends | ? | | | ? | | | | | ? | | | ? | Not used | ? | Not used | ? | Not used | | | | | ? | ? | | |
| Gentle curve ahead | | | | | | | | | | | | | | | | | | | | | | | | | |
| Sharp curve ahead | | | | | | | | | | | | | | ? | | | | | | | | | | | |
| Double gentle curve ahead | | | | ? | | ? | | | | | | | Not used | ? | | ? | ? | | | | | | | | |
| Double sharp curve ahead | | | | | | | | | | | | | | | | | | | | | | | | | |
| Series of curves ahead | | | | | | | | | | | | | | ? | | ? | | | | | | | | | |
| Hairpin curve ahead | ? | | Not used | Not used | Not used | | | | | | | ? | Not used (Note: Unofficial versions exist.) | ? | Not used | ? | Not used | ? | | ? | | | | | |
| Loop curve ahead | ? | | ? | ? | ? | ? | ? | ? | ? | ? | | | | ? | ? | ? | | ? | ? | ? | ? | ? | ? | | ? |
| Chevron (short turn) | | | | | | | | | ? | | ? | | | ? | ? | ? | | | | ? | | | | | ? |
| Chevron (sharp turn) | | | ? | | | | | | ? | ? | ? | ? | | ? | ? | ? | ? | ? | | ? | ? | | | | ? |
| | Argentina | Australia | Brazil | Cambodia | Canada | Canada (British Columbia) | Canada (Ontario) | Canada (Quebec) | Chile | Colombia | Ecuador | Indonesia | Ireland | Jamaica | Japan | Liberia | Malaysia | Mexico | New Zealand | Panama | Peru | Philippines | Thailand | United States | Uruguay |
| School zone | | or (Note: Top sign used in Victoria. Middle-top sign used in New South Wales. Middle-bottom sign used in Queensland.) or or | | | | | | | | | | | | | | | | | | | | | | or | |
| Children / playground ahead | | or | | | or | or | | or | | | | | | or | | | | | | | | | | | |
| Pedestrian crossing ahead | | | | | | | or | | | | | | | | Not used | | | | or | | | | | | |
| Pedestrian crossing | | | | | | | or | | | | | | or | | | or | | | | | Not used | | | | |
| Disabled / elderly pedestrian crossing | ? | or | ? | | | ? | | or | ? | ? | ? | | Not used | ? | ? | ? | or or | ? | | ? | ? | | ? | | ? |
| Cyclists crossing | | | | | or | | | | | | | | | | | | ? | | | | | | ? | | |
| Falling rocks or debris | | | | | | | | | | | | | | | | | | | | | | | | or | |
| | Argentina | Australia | Brazil | Cambodia | Canada | Canada (British Columbia) | Canada (Ontario) | Canada (Quebec) | Chile | Colombia | Ecuador | Indonesia | Ireland | Jamaica | Japan | Liberia | Malaysia | Mexico | New Zealand | Panama | Peru | Philippines | Thailand | United States | Uruguay |
| Opening or swing bridge | | | | Not used | | | | | ? | ? | ? | | | | Not used | | | | ? | | ? | | | | |
| Quay or riverbank | ? | Not used | ? | | ? | ? | ? | ? | | ? | | | | | ? | | ? | ? | ? | ? | ? | ? | ? | Not used | ? |
| Emergency vehicles | | | Not used | Not used | | | | | ? | | | ? | Not used | ? | Not used | | Not used | or or | | Not used | | Not used | Not used | | ? |
| Farm vehicles | | | | Not used | or | | | | | | | ? | | ? | Not used | | Not used | | ? | | | Not used | Not used | or | |
| Domesticated animals | | | | | | | | | | | | | | | Not used | | | | | | | | | | |
| Wild animals | | | | | | | | | | | ? | | | ? | | | | | | | ? | Not used | ? | | |
| Equestrians | | | Not used | Not used | | | | | ? | ? | ? | ? | | ? | Not used | | ? | ? | | ? | ? | Not used | Not used | | |
| Tunnel ahead | | Not used | Not used | Not used | | | ? | | | | | Not used | | | Not used | | | | | ? | | ? | ? | | ? |
| Height restriction ahead | | | | Not used | | | | | | | | | | ? | Not used | ? | Not used | | | ? | | | | | |
| Width restriction ahead | | Not used | | Not used | Not used | | Not used | | | | | | | ? | Not used | ? | Not used | | Not used | | | | | Not used | |
| Length restriction ahead | ? | Not used | | ? | ? | ? | ? | ? | | ? | | ? | | ? | ? | ? | ? | | ? | ? | ? | | ? | Not used | ? |
| Weight restriction ahead | ? | Not used | | Not used | Not used | | | | | | | ? | | ? | Not used | ? | Not used | | Not used | ? | ? | | Not used | | ? |
| Roadworks | ? | | | or | | | | | | | | | | | | | | | | | | Not used | | | |
| Flagman ahead | ? | | ? | ? | | | | | | | | | | ? | ? | ? | | | | ? | ? | ? | ? | | ? |
| Traffic congestion | ? | | ? | ? | ? | | ? | | ? | ? | Not used | Not used | | ? | ? | | ? | ? | | ? | ? | ? | ? | | ? |
| Other danger | | Not used | ? | | Not used | Not used | Not used | Not used | | ? | Not used | | | | | | | ? | | | | ? | | Not used | ? |
| | Argentina | Australia | Brazil | Cambodia | Canada | Canada (British Columbia) | Canada (Ontario) | Canada (Quebec) | Chile | Colombia | Ecuador | Indonesia | Ireland | Jamaica | Japan | Liberia | Malaysia | Mexico | New Zealand | Panama | Peru | Philippines | Thailand | United States | Uruguay |

=== Regulatory ===
| | Argentina | Australia | Brazil | Cambodia | Canada | Canada - British Columbia | Canada - Ontario | Canada - Quebec | Chile | Colombia | Ecuador | Indonesia | Ireland | Jamaica | Japan | Liberia | Malaysia | Mexico | New Zealand | Panama | Peru | Philippines | Thailand | United States | Uruguay |
|---|---|---|---|---|---|---|---|---|---|---|---|---|---|---|---|---|---|---|---|---|---|---|---|---|---|
| Stop | | | | or | | | | | | | | | | | | | | | | | | | | | |
| Yield / Give Way | | | | | | | | | | | | | or | | (Note: Recent signs have the English translation “SLOW” below “徐行”. The sign alone, without the additional sign “前方優先道路” only means “slow down” and not “give way”.) | | | | | | | | | | |
| Yield to oncoming traffic | | | ? | | | | | | | | ? | | Not used | ? | Not used | | | ? | | ? | ? | ? | | | ? |
| Priority over oncoming traffic | ? | Not used | ? | | ? | ? | ? | ? | ? | ? | ? | | Not used | ? | ? | | ? | ? | | ? | ? | ? | ? | ? | ? |
| Priority road | ? | Not used | ? | | ? | ? | ? | ? | ? | ? | ? | ? | Not used | ? | | | ? | | ? | ? | ? | ? | ? | ? | ? |
| End of priority road | ? | Not used | ? | | ? | ? | ? | ? | ? | ? | ? | ? | Not used | ? | | | ? | ? | ? | ? | ? | ? | ? | ? | ? |
| No entry | or | or (Note: Top sign used in Queensland, South Australia, Tasmania, Victoria, and Western Australia. Bottom sign used in the Australian Capital Territory, New South Wales, and the Northern Territory.) | | | | or | | | | | | | or | | | | | | | or | | | | | or |
| Road closed | ? | or | ? | | | | | | ? | | ? | | | | | | ? | ? | | ? | ? | | | | |
| | Argentina | Australia | Brazil | Cambodia | Canada | Canada (British Columbia) | Canada (Ontario) | Canada (Quebec) | Chile | Colombia | Ecuador | Indonesia | Ireland | Jamaica | Japan | Liberia | Malaysia | Mexico | New Zealand | Panama | Peru | Philippines | Thailand | United States | Uruguay |
| No motor vehicles | | Not used | | | | | ? | | | | | | Not used | | | | ? | | ? | | | | | | |
| No motorcycles | | Not used | | | | Not used | ? | | | | | | Not used | | | | | | | | | | | | |
| No mopeds | ? | Not used | ? | ? | ? | ? | ? | | ? | | ? | ? | Not used | | | | | ? | ? | ? | ? | ? | ? | | ? |
| No bicycles | | | | | | | | | | | | | | | | | | | | | | | | | |
| No pedestrians | | | | ? | | | | | | | | | | | | | ? | | | | | | | or | |
| No heavy goods vehicles | | | | | | | | | | | | | | | | | | | | | | | | or | |
| | Argentina | Australia | Brazil | Cambodia | Canada | Canada (British Columbia) | Canada (Ontario) | Canada (Quebec) | Chile | Colombia | Ecuador | Indonesia | Ireland | Jamaica | Japan | Liberia | Malaysia | Mexico | New Zealand | Panama | Peru | Philippines | Thailand | United States | Uruguay |
| No buses | ? | | ? | | | | ? | | | | | | Not used | ? | | ? | ? | | | ? | ? | | ? | | ? |
| No trailers | | Not used | ? | | | | ? | | ? | ? | ? | ? | Not used | or | ? | or | ? | ? | ? | ? | ? | | | | ? |
| No farm vehicles | | Not used | | | ? | ? | | ? | | | | Not used | Not used | | ? | | ? | | ? | ? | | ? | | ? | |
| No animal-drawn vehicles | | Not used | | | ? | ? | ? | ? | | | | ? | | | ? | | ? | | ? | | | | | ? | |
| No vehicles carrying dangerous goods | ? | Not used | ? | ? | | | | | ? | ? | ? | ? | Not used | ? | | | ? | ? | ? | ? | ? | ? | | | ? |
| No vehicles carrying explosives or inflammables | ? | Not used | ? | | ? | ? | ? | ? | ? | ? | ? | ? | | ? | ? | | ? | ? | ? | ? | ? | ? | ? | | ? |
| No vehicles carrying water pollutants | ? | Not used | ? | ? | ? | ? | ? | ? | ? | ? | ? | ? | Not used | ? | ? | | ? | ? | ? | ? | ? | ? | ? | ? | ? |
| No handcarts | | Not used | | | ? | ? | ? | ? | | | | Not used | Not used | | | | ? | | ? | ? | ? | | | ? | ? |
| | Argentina | Australia | Brazil | Cambodia | Canada | Canada (British Columbia) | Canada (Ontario) | Canada (Quebec) | Chile | Colombia | Ecuador | Indonesia | Ireland | Jamaica | Japan | Liberia | Malaysia | Mexico | New Zealand | Panama | Peru | Philippines | Thailand | United States | Uruguay |
| Maximum speed limit | | | | | Varies by Province | | | | | | | | | | | or (Note: Some speed limit signs are explicitly labeled in miles per hour, but most are either explicitly or implicitly measured in kilometers per hour. Some signs use the MUTCD's metric speed limit design.) | | | | | | | | | |
| Minimum speed limit | | Not used | Not used (Note: By law the Minimum Speed for a given road is half of Maximum Speed set for the same road) | | | Not used | Not used | | | | ? | | Not used | ? | | ? | Not used | ? | Not used | ? | | | | | ? |
| Speed restriction ends | | | Not used | | Not used | | Not used | Not used | Not used | Not used | Not used | | Not used | ? | or | ? | | Not used | | ? | ? | | | (Note: Used only in New York.) | ? |
| Maximum height | | | | | | | | | | | | | | | | | | | | | | | | | |
| Maximum width | | Not used | | | Not used | Not used | Not used | | | | | | | | | | | | Not used | | | | | Not used | |
| Maximum length | | | | | ? | ? | | | ? | ? | | | | | ? | | ? | | | ? | ? | | | | |
| Maximum weight | | | | | | | | | | | | | | | | | | | ? | | | | | | |
| Maximum weight per axle | | | | | | | | | | ? | | | | | Not used | | Not used | ? | | | | | ? | | |
| | Argentina | Australia | Brazil | Cambodia | Canada | Canada (British Columbia) | Canada (Ontario) | Canada (Quebec) | Chile | Colombia | Ecuador | Indonesia | Ireland | Jamaica | Japan | Liberia | Malaysia | Mexico | New Zealand | Panama | Peru | Philippines | Thailand | United States | Uruguay |
| No left turn | | or | | | | | | | | | | | | | Not used (Note: Japan indicates movement restrictions by means of mandatory signs only:) | | | | | | | or | | | |
| No right turn | | or | | | | | | | | | | | | | Not used | | | | | | | or | | | |
| No U-turn | | or | | | | | | | | | | | | | | | | | | | | or | | | |
| No parking | | | | | | | | | | | | | | | | | | | | | | | | | |
| No stopping | | or (Note: Top sign used everywhere but New South Wales. Bottom sign used only in New South Wales.) | | | | | | | | | | | | | | | | | | | | | | | |
| Restricted parking zone | ? | | ? | ? | ? | ? | ? | ? | ? | ? | ? | ? | | ? | ? | | ? | ? | ? | ? | ? | | ? | ? | ? |
| No overtaking (Note: In many jurisdictions, "Overtaking Permitted" is indicated solely through a change in road markings, e.g. a solid center line changing to a dashed center line. In such jurisdictions, signs in this category are only posted in locations where a change in road markings is deemed insufficient notice for drivers. This is in contrast to "No Overtaking" signs, which are almost always posted alongside changes in road markings to indicate the end of an overtaking zone.) | | | | | | | | | | | | | | | | | | | ? | and (Note: Pennant signs are placed facing traffic in the passing lane, i.e. on the left side of the road for right-hand driving countries. They are used in conjunction with standard-shaped signs placed facing traffic in the travel lane, i.e. on the right side of the road.) | and | | and | and | |
| Minimum following distance between vehicles | ? | (Note: Used in Queensland, New South Wales, Victoria and the Australian Capital Territory.) | ? | | ? | ? | ? | ? | ? | or | ? | ? | Not used | ? | ? | | ? | ? | ? | ? | ? | ? | ? | ? | ? |
| No honking | | Not used | | | ? | ? | ? | ? | | | | | Not used | | ? | | | | ? | | | | | Not used | |
| | Argentina | Australia | Brazil | Cambodia | Canada | Canada (British Columbia) | Canada (Ontario) | Canada (Quebec) | Chile | Colombia | Ecuador | Indonesia | Ireland | Jamaica | Japan | Liberia | Malaysia | Mexico | New Zealand | Panama | Peru | Philippines | Thailand | United States | Uruguay |

=== Mandatory or permitted actions ===
| | Argentina | Australia | Brazil | Cambodia | Canada | Canada - British Columbia | Canada - Ontario | Canada - Quebec | Chile | Colombia | Ecuador | Indonesia | Ireland | Jamaica | Japan | Liberia | Malaysia | Mexico | New Zealand | Panama | Peru | Philippines | Thailand | United States | Uruguay |
|---|---|---|---|---|---|---|---|---|---|---|---|---|---|---|---|---|---|---|---|---|---|---|---|---|---|
| Proceed straight (no turns) | | | | | | | Not used (Note: Ontario indicates movement restrictions by means of prohibitory signs only:) | | | | | | | | | | | | | | | | | | |
| Turn right | | Not used | | | | | Not used | ? | | ? | ? | | | | Not used | | | | Not used | | | | | | |
| Turn right ahead | | | | | | Not used | Not used | | Not used | | | | | | | | | | | | Not used | | | | |
| Proceed straight or turn right | | Not used | | | | Not used | Not used | | Not used | Not used | | | Not used | | | | | Not used | | Not used | Not used | Not used | Not used | | Not used |
| Seatbelts required | ? | Not used | ? | ? | | ? | | | ? | ? | | ? | Not used | ? | ? | ? | ? | | ? | ? | ? | | ? | | |
| Living street | ? | Not used | ? | ? | | | | | ? | | ? | ? | | ? | ? | | ? | | ? | ? | ? | ? | | ? | ? |
| Keep right (or left) | | | | | or | | | | | | or | | | | | | | or | | | Not used | | | or | |
| Pass on either side | | | | Not used | | | | | | | | | | | Not used | ? | or | | | ? | | | or | or (Note: Used only in New York.) | |
| Route for heavy goods vehicles and vehicles carrying dangerous goods | ? | Not used | ? | ? | | ? | ? | | ? | ? | ? | ? | Not used | ? | ? | | ? | | ? | ? | ? | ? | ? | and | ? |
| Roundabout | Not used | | | | | | | | | | | | (Note: Mini-roundabouts only.) | | | | | | | | Not used | | | or | |
| Overtaking permitted | | | | | | | | | | | ? | | Not used | | | | or | ? | | ? | ? | Not used | | | ? |
| Shared use path | | | | | or | ? | | | | | | | | | | | ? | | | ? | ? | Not used | ? | | ? |
| Bicycles only | | | | | | | | | | | | | | | | | | | | | | | | | |
| Transit only | | | | | | | | | | ? | | | Not used | ? | | ? | ? | | | ? | | ? | | | ? |
| Equestrians only | | Not used | ? | ? | ? | ? | ? | ? | ? | ? | ? | | Not used | | ? | | ? | | ? | ? | ? | ? | ? | ? | ? |
| | Argentina | Australia | Brazil | Cambodia | Canada | Canada (British Columbia) | Canada (Ontario) | Canada (Quebec) | Chile | Colombia | Ecuador | Indonesia | Ireland | Jamaica | Japan | Liberia | Malaysia | Mexico | New Zealand | Panama | Peru | Philippines | Thailand | United States | Uruguay |

=== Other (indication) ===
| | Argentina | Australia | Brazil | Cambodia | Canada | Canada - British Columbia | Canada - Ontario | Canada - Quebec | Chile | Colombia | Ecuador | Indonesia | Ireland | Jamaica | Japan | Liberia | Malaysia | Mexico | New Zealand | Panama | Peru | Philippines | Thailand | United States | Uruguay |
|---|---|---|---|---|---|---|---|---|---|---|---|---|---|---|---|---|---|---|---|---|---|---|---|---|---|
| Speed camera | ? | or | ? | ? | ? | | ? | ? | ? | ? | ? | ? | | ? | ? | ? | ? | | | ? | ? | ? | ? | | ? |
| One-way street | | | | | or | or | | | | | | | | | | | | | | | | | | or | |
| Two-way traffic | | | | ? | | | | | | | | Not used | | | Not used | ? | Not used | | Not used | | | | Not used | | |
| Freeway begins | | or or | Not used | | Not used | | Not used | Not used | | ? | ? | | | ? | Not used | | | ? | or | ? | | | | | ? |
| Freeway ends | | or or | Not used | | ? | | ? | ? | | ? | ? | | | ? | Not used | | | ? | or | ? | | | | | ? |
| Dead end | | | | | or | | or | | ? | ? | | | | | Not used | | | | | | ? | | | or | ? |
| Parking zone | or | | | | or | or | or | or | | | or | | or (Note: The circular sign is used to indicate on-street parking, while the square-shaped sign indicates off-street parking.) | ? | | | | or | | or | or | | | or | or |
| Parking garage | ? | Not used | ? | ? | ? | ? | ? | ? | ? | ? | ? | ? | Not used | ? | ? | ? | ? | ? | ? | ? | ? | ? | | ? | ? |
| Taxi stand | | | ? | | ? | ? | ? | ? | ? | | ? | | | ? | ? | ? | ? | | or | ? | | ? | ? | | ? |
| Bus stop | | | ? | ? | Varies by Province | | or or | or | ? | | | | or | ? | | | | | | | | | | or | |
| Train station | | | ? | ? | | | | | | | ? | | | ? | | ? | ? | | ? | | ? | ? | | | ? |
| Airport | | | ? | | | | | | | | ? | | | ? | Not used | ? | | | ? | | ? | ? | | | |
| Hospital | | | ? | | | | | | or | | ? | | | | Not used | | | | ? | | | | | | |
| Electric vehicle charging station | ? | | ? | ? | ? | | ? | | ? | ? | ? | ? | or | ? | ? | ? | ? | | ? | ? | ? | ? | | | ? |
| Customs post | | (Note: Australia has no land borders. The sign is used when interstate borders are closed (e.g. during COVID-19 restrictions).) | | | | Not used | Not used | | | | | | (Note: For ferry terminals and ports only.) | Not used (Note: This country has no land borders.) | Not used | | ? | | Not used | | | ? | | Not used | |
| National highway shield(s) | | | | | (National Hwy across Canada) | (Provincial Hwy) | (Provincial Hwy) (Toll Hwy) (Regional Route) | (Provincial Hwy) (Regional Route) | | | | | | | | ? | (Expressway) (Federal road) | | | | | | (National highway) (Tolled motorway) (Free motorway) | | |
| | Argentina | Australia | Brazil | Cambodia | Canada | Canada (British Columbia) | Canada (Ontario) | Canada (Quebec) | Chile | Colombia | Ecuador | Indonesia | Ireland | Jamaica | Japan | Liberia | Malaysia | Mexico | New Zealand | Panama | Peru | Philippines | Thailand | United States | Uruguay |

== See also ==
- Comparison of European road signs
- Comparison of traffic signs in English-speaking territories
- Glossary of road transport terms
- Manual on Uniform Traffic Control Devices
- Traffic sign
- Vienna Convention on Road Signs and Signals
