= Giuseppe Montalbano =

Giuseppe Montalbano may refer to:

- Giuseppe Montalbano (1895–1989), Italian politician, member of the National Council and Constituent National Assembly
- Giuseppe Montalbano (1925–2021), Italian politician, mayor and senator
