= Interstate (typeface) =

Sans-serif typeface

- Category: Sans-serif
- Designer: Tobias Frere-Jones
- Foundry: Font Bureau
- Date released: 1993–1995
- Re-issuing foundries: Frere-Jones Type
- Design based on: Highway Gothic

Interstate is a digital typeface designed by Tobias Frere-Jones between 1993 and 1999. Originally developed for Font Bureau foundry, it has been owned and licensed by Frere-Jones Type since 2020. The typeface is based on the FHWA series of fonts, a series of signage alphabets drawn for the Federal Highway Administration by Dr. Theodore W. Forbes in 1949, assisted by J.E. Penton and E.E. Radek.

While optimal for signage, Interstate has refinements making it suitable for text setting in print and on-screen, and gained popularity as such in the 1990s. Due to its wide spacing, it is best suited for display usage in print.

The terminals of ascending and descending strokes are cut at an angle to the stroke (see lowercase "t" and "l"), and on curved strokes (see lowercase "e" and "s"), terminals are drawn at a 90° angle to the stroke, positioning them at an angle to the baseline. Counters are open, even in the bold and bold condensed weights, further contributing to legibility. Punctuation is based on a rectangular shape, while official FHWA punctuation is based on a circular shape.

Since 2011, Interstate has been held in the permanent collection of Museum of Modern Art (MoMA) in New York.

== Usage ==
Interstate's popularity in 1990s and 2000s led to it being called "ubiquitous", "familiar", "classic", and "iconic". It has been referred to as "one of the most popular faces of the 90s" by Communication Arts.

The font is used by a number of large organizations in their logotypes and branding materials. Notable examples include Citigroup (Citibank), and Sainsbury's supermarkets, as well as signage for Southwest Airlines, Invesco, UK rail company c2c, Ealing / Hammersmith / West London College, Trinity College London, Lamborghini, Cognizant, SoundCloud, and CISV. It is also used for the logo of the Spanish social-democratic party PSOE.

Interstate is used for signage at Staten Island Ferry Whitehall Terminal in New York City.

From 1998 to 2006, NBC Sports used the font for its graphic presentation (NBC used an italicized version of the font for headlines, announcer names and other details like names of players from 2002 to 2006). NBC switched to a different graphics style and fonts when NBC launched Sunday Night Football on September 10, 2006, after it picked up the NFL sunday night contract from ESPN, which held all the rights from 1998-2005, before this, it shared the package with TNT Sports from 1991-97.

In 2004, The Weather Channel started using the fonts on-air and on IntelliStar systems. It was added to TWC's WeatherSTAR XL in a graphical update in 2005. It was mainly retired in 2008, for Helvetica Neue and Akzidenz-Grotesk; however, the font continued to be used on IntelliStar systems until November 2013, as part of a rebranding.

On January 29, 2005, the Indonesian television broadcaster SCTV used a modified version of Interstate in the "SCTV" lettermark, while initially using the typeface as its branding font for its programming promotion. However, in subsequent years, the font for SCTV's programming promotion changed to various other fonts.

In November 2006, the U.S. Army launched its Army Strong ad campaign, utilizing Interstate as its primary typeface for all ad materials.

In May 2008, Ernst & Young adopted the use of Interstate in marketing materials and reports as part of a new global visual identity.

The 2010 video game GoldenEye 007 uses Interstate Light Condensed for all in-game text.

The typeface is used on the Global Television Network its on-air newscasts and general branding.

The Sesame Street sign logo uses Interstate in Compressed Bold starting with its 1997 logo.

Interstate has also been widely used for newspapers and magazines, including Los Angeles Times, Radio Times, and the Daily Mirror newspaper who use the font in their TV guide and headlines. Virgin Media 360 also uses it on their interface.

== Typefaces inspired by Interstate ==
Parachute Type Foundry designed the PF Grand Gothik Variable typeface, based on the Interstate typeface, with OpenType features.

Parachute Type Foundry also designed the PF Highway Sans typeface, which also based on the Interstate typeface.

Ray Larabie also designed the Expressway typeface, which also based on the Interstate typeface.

== See also ==
- Overpass, an open source alternative to Interstate, commissioned by Red Hat
- Clearview, a highway signage typeface designed to replace Highway Gothic

== Sources ==
- Friedl, Friedrich; Ott, Nicolaus; Stein, Bernard (1998). Typography: An Encyclopedic Survey of Type Design and Techniques Throughout History. Running Press. ISBN 9781579120238.
- Haley, Allan (1998). Type: Hot Designers Make Cool Fonts. Rockport Publishers. ISBN 9781564963178.
- MacMillan, Neil (2006). An A-Z of Type Designers. Yale University Press. ISBN 0300111517.
- Spiekermann, Erik (2014). Stop stealing sheep & find out how type works (Third edition ed.). San Jose, CA: AdobePress. ISBN 978-0-321-93428-4.
- Carter, Rob (2015). Typographic design: form and communication (6. ed ed.). Hoboken, NJ: Wiley. ISBN 978-1-118-71576-5.
- Shaw, Paul; Hoefler, Jonathan (2017). Revival type: digital typefaces inspired by the past. New Haven, CT: Yale University Press. ISBN 978-0-300-21929-6.
