= Overpass (typeface) =

Geometric sans-serif typeface

- Category: Sans-serif
- Designers: Delve Withrington (principal), Dave Bailey, Thomas Jockin, Alan Dague-Greene, Jason Campbell, Aaron Bell
- Foundry: Delve Fonts
- Date released: August 28, 2015
- License: SIL Open Font License
- Website: overpassfont.org
- Latest release version: 4.0
- Latest release date: September 10, 2021

Overpass is a sans-serif digital typeface based on the American road sign typeface Highway Gothic, intended for use as a webfont on digital screens for user interfaces and websites. It was designed by Delve Withrington with [Dave Bailey, Thomas Jockin, Alan Dague-Greene, and Aaron Bell between 2011 and 2021. It has 9 weights and obliques.

Overpass was commissioned by Red Hat for use in user interfaces. At that time, the commercial typeface Interstate was Red Hat's corporate typeface, but its lack of availability as a web font and the time it took to generate new images with each new update of their software were the motivators to commission Overpass.

Overpass was initially developed for Red Hat by Delve Withrington in 2011 and had only two weights (regular and bold) with hinting for the TrueType format fonts performed by Jason Campbell. The 2015 update to version 3.0 was developed by Delve Withrington with assistance from Dave Bailey, Thomas Jockin, Alan Dague-Greene, and expert consultation by Michael Luton on Overpass Mono. The newly rebuilt family was released as open source and included the addition of six more weights plus corrected oblique "italic" styles, and a new monospaced version called Overpass Mono, which itself has a range of 5 weights.

In 2021, with the sponsorship of Google Fonts, the typeface was expanded again by Delve Fonts with the addition of Variable versions and support for Cyrillic script. Post-production assistance on that version (4.0) was provided by Aaron Bell on behalf of Google Fonts.

== See also ==
- IBM Plex – the open-source corporate font family of IBM.
- Clearview, another typeface for road signage
