= Montalbán (surname) =

Montalbán or Montalban is a surname of Hispanic origin. Persons bearing the name include:

- Carlos Montalbán (1903–1991), Mexican character actor, brother of Ricardo
- Isabel Pérez Montalbán (born 1964), Spanish poet
- Juan Pérez de Montalbán (1602–1638), Spanish priest, poet, and novelist
- Juvenal Edjogo Owono Montalbán (born 1979), Equatoguinean professional footballer
- Madeline Montalban (1910–1982), English ceremonial magician
- Manuel Vázquez Montalbán (1939–2003), Spanish journalist, novelist, and humorist
- Óscar Montalbán Ramos (born 1976), better known as Rubio, Spanish professional footballer
- Paolo Montalban (born 1973), Filipino-American actor and singer
- Ricardo Montalbán (1920–2009), Mexican film and stage actor

Fictional character

- Soraya Montenegro de la Vega Montalban, character in the Mexican television series María la del Barrio

== See also ==
- Montalbano (disambiguation)
