= Consolidated Appropriations Act, 2018 =

United States Law

Making appropriations for the fiscal year ending September 30, 2018, and for other purposes.
- Other short titles: Consolidated Appropriations Act, 2018
- Long title: "An Act to amend the State Department Basic Authorities Act of 1956 to include severe forms of trafficking in persons within the definition of transnational organized crime for purposes of the rewards program of the Department of State, and for other purposes"
- Nicknames: Omnibus spending bill, Omnibus 2018
- Enacted by: the 115th United States Congress

Citations
- Public law: Pub. L. 115–141 (text) (PDF)
- Statutes at Large: 132 Stat. 348

Legislative history
- Introduced in the House as "TARGET Act (Targeted Rewards for the Global Eradication of Human Trafficking)" (H.R. 1625) by Edward R. Royce (R-CA) on March 20, 2017; Committee consideration by House Committee on Foreign Affairs, Senate Committee on Foreign Relations; Passed the House on May 22, 2017 (Voice Vote); Passed the Senate on February 28, 2018 (Unanimous Consent) with amendment; House agreed to Senate amendment on March 22, 2018 (256-167) with further amendment; Senate agreed to House amendment on March 23, 2018 (65-32); Signed into law by President Donald Trump on March 23, 2018

The Consolidated Appropriations Act, 2018 (Pub. L. 115–141 (text) (PDF)) is a United States omnibus spending bill for the United States federal government for fiscal year 2018 enacted by the 115th United States Congress and signed into law by President Donald Trump on March 23, 2018.

== Legislative history ==
On the evening of March 21, 2018, the text of the Consolidated Appropriations Act, 2018 was released. The text was posted to the web site of the United States House Committee on Rules at 10:00 p.m. H.R. 1625, formerly the TARGET act, was used as a legislative vehicle for the appropriations bill. At 10:15 p.m., the committee's Chairman Pete Sessions (R-Texas) said he did not have a printout of the bill to consider. The Committee voted 8–3 to allow one hour of debate on the full bill and to disallow all points of order against the motion to add the more than 2,000 pages to the bill. The rule was filed at 1:20 a.m. The one hour of debate began at 9:15 a.m. Afterwards, James McGovern (D-Massachusetts) advocated to amend the bill further in order to be able to add text to adjust the status of unauthorized immigrants who entered the U.S. as children. The House voted 233–186 to disallow adding any text to the bill other than the more than 2,000 pages proposed the night before.

Approximately 17 hours after the 2,232-page bill was released, the House of Representatives passed the bill 256–167 on March 22. That morning, Office of Management and Budget Director Mick Mulvaney said, "Is the president going to sign the bill? Yes. Why? Because it funds his priorities." The Senate passed the bill 65–32 after midnight on March 23.

The morning of March 23, President Donald Trump said he might veto the bill because it would not fully fund a planned wall along the Mexico–United States border and would not address the individuals who entered the United States as children and are present in the United States without legal status. President Trump signed the bill later in the day.

== Provisions ==
=== General appropriations ===
- The bill funds the federal government through September 30, 2018.
- The bill includes large increases to both defense and non-defense spending, following the budget-cap increases that had been included in the Bipartisan Budget Act of 2018 Pub. L. 115–123 (text) (PDF).
- The bill bans federal funds going to ACORN, an organization that dissolved in 2010, along with "any of its affiliates, subsidiaries, allied organizations, or successors."
- Federal funding cannot be used to move employees from the National Finance Center, which provides payroll and human-resources services to federal agencies.

=== Arts and humanities ===
- The bill increases the budget of the National Endowment for the Arts and the National Endowment for the Humanities by $3 million.

=== Commerce ===
- The National Oceanic and Atmospheric Administration budget is increased by $234 million, including $20 million for disaster assistance to fisheries and $65 million for the salmon recovery program along the Pacific coast.
- The Food and Drug Administration must act against foods that are labeled as milk, cheese, or yogurt but are not made from a product of a dairy animal.

=== Congress ===
- Reports prepared by the Congressional Research Service must be made easily available to the public.

=== Department of Agriculture ===
- Agricultural businesses are exempted from reporting emissions from manure under the Comprehensive Environmental Response, Compensation and Liability Act.
- The bill prevents the closure of the U.S. Sheep Experiment Station, an agricultural experiment station that increases efficiency in sheep production and improve the sustainability of rangeland ecosystems.
- The bill delays the implementation of regulations requiring trucks that carry livestock to install electronic devices to monitor time spent driving.
- The Pesticide Registration Improvement Act is extended to September 30, 2018. The Pesticide Registration Improvement Act created a registration service fee system for applications for specific pesticide registration, amended registration, and associated actions.
- The foreign catfish inspection program received a $5.5 million increase. Equivalence determinations must be completed within 180 days for each country that wants to continue exporting catfish to the United States. Imports of catfish are prohibited until a final rule of equivalence is issued if the deadline is not met.

=== Department of Defense ===
- The bill increased the budget of the Department of Defense by $61 billion. Military employees will receive an increase in pay of 2.4 percent.
- The bill added funding for approximately 17,000 more active duty troops and 10,000 more reserve troops in 2018.
- The bill included $34.4 billion for defense health and family programs, $359 million for cancer research, $125 million for research of traumatic brain injury and mental health, and $287 million for prevention of sexual assault and responses to sexual assault.
- The Department of Defense is now prohibited from spending more than 25 percent of its budget during the last two months of the fiscal year. Previously, the Department of Defense was limited to 20 percent.
- The Department of Defense is now allowed to reallocate to $20 million of its budget without notifying Congress. Previously, the threshold was $15 million.
- The United States Army Corps of Engineers' budget was increased by $789 million.

=== Department of Energy ===
- The Advanced Research Projects Agency-Energy received an increase of $47 million. The Trump Administration had wanted to eliminate it.
- The Office of Energy Efficiency and Renewable Energy received an increase of $200 million. The Trump Administration had proposed to eliminate it.
- The Office of Science received an increase of $863 million.

=== Department of Health and Human Services ===
- The Child Care Development Block Grant, which provide child-care services for low-income family members who work, receive employment training, attend school, or whose children receive or need to receive protective services, was increased by $2.3 billion.
- Head Start, which provides comprehensive early-childhood education, health, nutrition, and parent-involvement services to low-income children and their families, received an increase of $610 million.

=== Department of the Interior ===
- The National Park Service received an increase of $138 million, intended to help its maintenance backlog.
- The Bureau of Land Management's budget was increased by $79 million. Of that increase, $50 million is for improving the maintenance backlog on federal lands.
- The Land and Water Conservation Fund's budget was increased by $25 million.
- The Fish and Wildlife Service received an increase of $75 million. Of that increase, $53 million is for addressing its maintenance backlog at federal wildlife refuges and federal fish hatcheries.

=== Department of the Treasury ===
- The Internal Revenue Service was allocated $196 million to improve customer service, modernize its systems, and implement the Tax Cuts and Jobs Act of 2017.
- The Internal Revenue Service is prohibited from spending federal funds "to target citizens of the United States for exercising any right guaranteed under the First Amendment to the Constitution of the United States" or "to target groups for regulatory scrutiny based on their ideological beliefs."
- The Internal Revenue Service may not spend federal funds "to issue, revise, or finalize any regulation, revenue ruling, or other guidance not limited to a particular taxpayer relating to the standard which is used to determine whether an organization is operated exclusively for the promotion of social welfare for purposes of section 501(c)(4)."

=== Domestic aid ===
- The bill authorizes $74 billion for the adult Supplemental Nutrition Assistance Program.
- The bill adds $15 million of funding for the Denali Commission, which helps remote villages in Alaska affected by erosion and the impact of climate change. The Trump Administration had previously recommended eliminating the Denali Commission.
- The National Flood Insurance Program was extended through July 31, 2018.

=== Education ===
- The United States Department of Education will forgive $350-million worth of student debts of borrowers under the Public Service Loan Forgiveness program.
- The bill increased the maximum award for Pell Grants by $175.
- The bill adds $60 million to TRIO, eight programs that help low-income individuals, first-generation college students, and individuals with disabilities to attend middle school, high school, college, and graduate school.
- The bill adds $10 million to GEAR UP, a program that helps middle schools and high schools in areas with high rates of poverty and provides college scholarships to students with low incomes.
- The bill gives $5 million of funding for the National Park Service's HBCU Historic Preservation Program.
- The bill added $10 million of funding for the HBCU Capital Financing Program, which finances improvements to the infrastructure of historically black colleges and universities and improves their infrastructure.

=== Elections ===
- States are given $380 million to improve their voting systems.

=== Employment ===
- The bill adds $2.7 million of funding for the Department of Labor to fund clinics to treat coalworker's pneumoconiosis and counseling services for coal miners with disabilities.
- Appalachian Regional Commission's budget is increased by $3 million, a third of which funds job retraining in counties hurt most by the decline of the coal industry. The Trump Administration previously proposed eliminating the Appalachian Regional Commission.
- The bill exempts Major League Baseball teams from paying minimum wage to minor-league players under contract.
- Employers are prohibited from keeping tips received by their employees.

=== Environment ===
- The bill gives $300 million for cleaning of the Great Lakes, particularly to prevent invasive Asian carp from reaching the Great Lakes by building new barriers and improving existing barriers.
- The White Clouds Wilderness in Idaho is named after former Governor Cecil D. Andrus, who died in 2017.

=== Foreign aid ===
- The Palestinian Authority is ineligible from receiving federal funds unless the Palestinian Authority stops providing stipends to Palestinians imprisoned in Israel for attacking Israel or people in Israel.
- According to Jamphel Shonu of the Tibetan Government in Exile, "The massive bill includes $8 million for Tibetans inside Tibet and $6 million for Tibetan community in India and Nepal. The Congress also approved an additional and a new line of funding of $3 million to strengthen the capacity of Tibetan institutions and governance in exile."

=== Homeland security ===
- The bill includes $1.6 billion for Mexico–United States border wall, less than the $25 billion sought by the Trump administration. The funding is largely restricted to upgrading existing fencing and planning and design.

=== Housing ===
- The bill increased the federal Low-Income Housing Tax Credit by 12.5 percent in order to offset the reduction in its value from the reduction of corporate tax rates by Pub. L. 115–97 (text) (PDF) ("Tax Cuts and Jobs Act").

=== Infrastructure ===
- Broadband internet will be extended to certain counties in central Appalachia by way of $10 million of funding.

=== Law enforcement ===
- The bill includes the CLOUD Act which amends the Stored Communications Act of 1986 to allow United States authorities to use warrants and subpoenas to require United States-based service providers to provide requested data stored on computer servers regardless of whether the servers are located within the United States or elsewhere. The bill also instructs the executive branch of the federal government to end mutual legal-assistance treaties with foreign governments.

=== Science and medical research ===
- The bill provided the largest increase in research funding in a decade, contrary to the significant cuts requested by the Trump administration. The budget of the National Institutes of Health was increased by $3 billion.
- The bill includes funding for the National Institutes of Health's research into opioids, the Centers for Disease Control's programs for overdose prevention and monitoring, improving access to treatment for people in rural areas who are addicted to opioids, and the development of a protocol to notify medical facilities about patients' previous opioid use.

=== Taxes ===
- A provision mistakenly included in Pub. L. 115–97 (text) (PDF) ("Tax Cuts and Jobs Act of 2017") that would favor farmer-owned cooperatives over agricultural businesses was removed.

=== Transportation ===
- Funding was included for the Gateway Program, a rail infrastructure program in the Northeast Corridor that had been a matter of dispute, but the funding was included as part of existing programs rather than as an explicit item.
- The Federal Highway Administration was forced to restore its interim approval of Clearview as an alternative to its 70-year-old custom typeface for guide signs on highways. The FHWA had rescinded its approval of Clearview in 2016.

=== Veterans ===
- Military personnel with an other-than-honorable discharge are required to have a mental health screening before departure.
- The United States Department of Veterans Affairs will offer mental health support to all veterans with at least 100 days of service in active duty, experienced sexual assault while serving, experienced trauma while serving, or operated an unmanned aerial vehicle.
- The United States Department of Veterans Affairs will allow veterans with other-than-honorable discharges to access its emergency rooms for urgent mental health care.
- Veterans with other-than-honorable discharges may appeal for discharge upgrades.
- Veterans are eligible to receive care at private-sector medical offices if deemed appropriate by a medical provider.
- The United States Department of Veterans Affairs must provide information on eligibility for benefits to affected veterans within six months of the bill's passage. Veterans must be able to call a phone number for more information. Usage of care must be tracked and reported to Congress.

=== Visas and immigration ===
- The bill authorizes an additional 60,000 H-2B visas to be issued each year. H-2B visas allow foreign workers to work in the United States on a one-time, seasonal, peakload, or intermittent basis.
- The bill extends the EB-5 program, which allows a foreign individual to immigrate and receive a green card if the person invests at least $1 million in a business in the United States that will employ at least 10 people.
- The EB-4 program is extended, which allows certain religious workers to immigrate and live permanently in the United States.
- The bill extends the Conrad 30 Waiver Program, which allows certain foreign physicians in family medicine, obstetrics, pediatrics, internal medicine, or psychiatry to remain in the United States to work in an area with a shortage of physicians, rather than be required to leave the country at the end of their medical residency training.
- The E-Verify program is extended for three years. E-Verify is a website by the Department of Homeland Security that allows businesses to verify the employment eligibility of their employees.

=== Weapons ===
- The bill strengthens requirements for reporting information to the National Instant Criminal Background Check System.
- Legislation was included to allow the Centers for Disease Control and Prevention to spend funds on gun-violence research, which was previously considered to be banned by the 1996 Dickey Amendment.
- The bill funds over $2 billion of grants to be awarded by the Bureau of Justice Statistics and the Office of Community Oriented Policing Services to train school employees and law-enforcement officers to identify signs of potential violence.

== Proposed provisions not included in the final bill ==
- An extension of the Deferred Action for Childhood Arrivals program was not included.
- The bill did not prohibit federal funding for Planned Parenthood's programs.
- The bill did not reinstate the Patient Protection and Affordable Care Act's cost sharing reductions subsidy, which would have reduced health insurance premiums by 40 percent. The bill also did not deregulate the health insurance industry.
- The bill did not fund the hiring of hundreds of new Border Patrol agents and immigration-enforcement agents.
- The bill did not increase the minimum age to purchase a firearm from 18 to 21.
- The bill did not ban the sale of bump stocks.
- The bill did not require a three-day waiting period before a person can purchase a firearm.
- The bill did not have penalties to cities that do not enforce federal immigration laws.
- The bill did not allow an individual with a permit to carry a concealed weapon to transport their guns across state lines.
- The bill did not eliminate federal funding for the Corporation for Public Broadcasting.
- The bill did not allow 501(c)(3) nonprofit organizations to endorse or oppose candidates for elective federal, state, or local public office.
- There were no provisions to make it more difficult for the president to terminate Special Counsel Robert Mueller or the Special Counsel investigation.
- The Economic Development Administration of the Department of Commerce continues to have funding, despite the Trump administration's proposal to eliminate it altogether. The Economic Development Administration gives money to rural communities to create jobs, retain existing jobs, and help businesses grow.
- NASA's Independent Verification and Validation Facility funding was restored, despite the Trump administration's attempts to eliminate it. The Independent Verification and Validation Facility increases cost-effectiveness and safety for NASA's mission-critical software.
- The bill did not allow logging in the Tongass National Forest.
- The bill did not prohibit mining in the National Forest System's land in the Emigrant Crevice area of the Custer Gallatin National Forest, north of Yellowstone National Park.
- The Clean Water Rule was not repealed.
- The bill does not budget any funding to develop and build a nuclear waste depository at Yucca Mountain in Nevada.
