= Michael S. Montalbano =

Michael S. Montalbano (28 April 1918 – 13 April 1989) was a computer scientist most noted for authoring "APL Blossom Time", a poem about the early days of the APL programming language, performed to the tune of The Battle of New Orleans. He published this poem and a few other articles under the pseudonym "J. C. L. Guest".

In 1974, he wrote a book called Decision Tables published by Science Research Associates.
