= James Montalbano =

American typeface designer

James Montalbano is a Brooklyn-based type designer and founder of Terminal Design Inc. He is a past president of the Type Directors Club, and has taught typography and typeface design at Pratt Institute, Parsons The New School for Design, and the School of Visual Arts. He has designed custom fonts for magazines including Glamour and Vanity Fair.

== Clearview Highway ==
Mantalbano was co-designer on the ClearviewHwy signage system, approved for use on all federal roads by the US Federal Highway Administration in 2004. More than 20 states have adopted use of the typeface as of 2011.
