= Highway Gothic =

Font commonly used for highway signs

- Category: Sans-serif
- Designer: Theodore W. Forbes
- Foundry: N/A
- Date released: 1948

The Standard Alphabets For Traffic Control Devices (also known as the FHWA Series fonts and unofficially as Highway Gothic) is a sans-serif typeface developed by the United States Federal Highway Administration (FHWA). The font is used for road signage in the United States and many other countries worldwide. The typefaces are designed to maximize legibility at long sight distances while traveling at road speeds.

== History ==
The typefaces are defined by the FHWA's Standard Alphabets for Traffic Control Devices, originally published in 1948, and reprinted in 1952. Changes to the specifications were published in 1966, 1977, and 2000. The 2000 specifications differ from earlier versions in the shapes of a few letters and in the inclusion of lowercase letters for all alphabet series. The typeface has seven fonts, from narrow to wider strokes, Series A through F 2000, with a modified version of Series E 2000.

FHWA Series A through F was developed during World War II by the Public Roads Administration (which later became FHWA). Draft versions of these typefaces were used in 1942 for signs on the Pentagon road network. Between 1949 and 1950, as part of a research program into freeway signing carried out by the California Department of Transportation (Caltrans), Series E Modified was developed from Series E by thickening the stroke width to accommodate button reflectors for ground-mounted signs, while a lowercase alphabet was developed to allow mixed-case legend (consisting initially of Series D and lowercase letters) to be used on externally illuminated overhead signs.

The lowercase letters, paired with Series E Modified, later became the basis of a national standard for mixed-case legend on freeway guide signs with the 1958 publication of the American Association of State Highway and Transportation Officials (AASHTO) signing and marking manual for Interstate Highways.

Series A has been officially discontinued in the United States due to poor legibility at high speeds, though it is still specified for certain signs in New Zealand. In 2004, the FHWA published lowercase letters for all of the typefaces and made changes to the Manual on Uniform Traffic Control Devices (MUTCD), which allows their use. The first font included only uppercase letters, except for Series E(M), which was used on large expressway and freeway guide signs.

There was an expectation that over the next few decades, the new Clearview typeface, also specifically developed for use on traffic signs, would replace the FHWA series on some new signage. In 2016, the FHWA announced that it was rescinding its 2004 interim approval of Clearview in the United States. While existing Clearview signs could stay up, new signs would have to go back to using Highway Gothic. In June 2016, a bill challenging this decision was introduced in the United States House of Representatives, which would have ordered the FHWA to reinstate the interim approval for Clearview. This bill passed as part of the Consolidated Appropriations Act, 2018. The Federal Highway Administration states "[Clearview] is completely optional and is neither required nor recommended".

== Usage ==
An official digital font file of the typeface has never been released. Instead, individuals or companies have developed digital fonts based on the shapes and specifications provided in the standard.

The Roadgeek 2014 font set is an open-source and digital reproduction of the FHWA fonts.

== By country ==
=== United States ===
An example road sign

Typically, one- or two-digit Interstate, U.S. Highway, and U.S. state route signs use the Series D font for the numbers, while signs with three or more digits use either a narrower font (Series B or C) or have smaller numbers in the Series D font. Series E and F is most commonly used on U.S. speed limit signs, although older signs often use narrower fonts. Street name signs usually features white Series B, C, or D letters on a green background, which can be substituted for other colors, such as blue or brown. They may have all capital letters or a combination of capital and lowercase letters. Freeway guide signs use Series E(M) on said backgrounds.

On white (regulatory), orange (construction), and yellow (warning) signs, black letters and numbers are used instead. Georgia uses both Series C and D fonts for the Interstate Highway signs until 2012. Beginning in 2016 when the interim approval for Clearview was rescinded, the Arizona Department of Transportation is now using mixed case (non-Modified) Series E for freeway guide signage, mixed case Series D for guide signage on non-freeway roads, and mixed case Series C for street name signs.

By the mid-1990s, the FHWA series of typefaces was used as a source of inspiration for a multi-weight print typeface designed by Tobias Frere-Jones of Font Bureau. Frere-Jones made accommodations for smaller print reproduction, and Font Bureau released the face under the name Interstate. It has been adopted by many companies for branding; for example, NBC used it for NBC Sports graphics packages from 1997 to 2006, and TV Guide uses the typeface on its cover. The Weather Channel utilized this typeface extensively, both on its weather maps and for its local forecasts.

=== Australia ===
Australia uses the same typeface as the United States for its road signs. This is specified in Australian Standard AS 1744:2015 Standard alphabets for road signs. AS1744 directly acknowledges the FHWA for assisting with development of AS1744, and states that AS1744 reproduces the metric version of the FHWA Series 2000 fonts.

=== Canada ===
The FHWA typefaces are also used predominantly on road signs in Canada. The province of Ontario used an in-house modified version until the late 1980s that featured slightly different characteristics, such as flat-top numeral 3's and numeral 1's without a serif. The city of Windsor began replacing its Helvetica signs with Highway Gothic in 2018.

=== Worldwide ===
Use of the font is seen in Peru (under different series labels), New Zealand, Indonesia and Malaysia. Other countries may use typefaces that are either derived directly from the FHWA series or very similar in appearance such as SICA countries, Brazil, Colombia, China, the Philippines, Thailand, Turkey, and before 2023, Mexico (which now uses its own original typeface).

In Portugal, a variant of Highway Gothic—the Rodoviária typeface—was used on road signs since the 1970s until the introduction of a new signage model in 1994–1998. It is still used for Portuguese-language text on road signs in Macau, a former Portuguese colony.

In Argentina, new road signs based on the Manual de Señalamiento Vertical—Edición 2017 used the FHWA typeface.

In India, the FHWA typeface used for highway shields only while Transport is used for road signs.

In mainland China, newer road signs use the FHWA typeface alongside Helvetica Bold for alphanumeric text.

In Taiwan, Arial Bold is used alongside FHWA Series E for English text.

A Directional sign road sign in Indonesia, using Highway Gothic

Indonesia formerly used the typeface from 1993 until 2014, regulated by Ministry of Transportation's law No. 62 year 1993. However, in 2014, Ministry of Transportation passed a regulation to introduce new road signs, being replaced with the new Clearview typeface.

In Spain, Series E is the base for Autopista typeface, formerly used on Spanish autopistas and autovías.

The Netherlands uses a derivative of the FHWA Alphabet Series typeface designed by the ANWB and the Dutch highways and waterways authority. The original set included two of the six series in the original typeface—RWS-Ee (wide, based on Series E (M)) and RWS-Cc (narrow, based on Series C) or ANWB-Ee (regular) and ANWB-Cc (condensed). Since 1997 the signs placed by the ANWB have used a new font called ANWB-Uu. Signs of other manufacturers continued using the old fonts. Since 2015 the ANWB-Uu font is not used any more on new signs; it has been replaced by RWS-Ee and the newly-designed RWS-Dd (based on the FHWA series D).

In Russia, Channel One used this font for its clock ident from 1996 to 2000.

Road signs in Saudi Arabia used variants of the typeface before 2023, when the Transport font replaced it.

== Variants ==
Derivative fonts include Interstate and Overpass. These fonts borrow heavily from the style of 'Highway Gothic', but have differences.

PBS, an American television network, between 2009 and 2019 used a custom derivative called, "PBS Explorer".

== Samples ==
Samples of the Standard Alphabets For Traffic Control Devices are shown below.

Series B 2000

Series C 2000

Series D 2000

Series E 2000

Series E Modified 2000

Series F 2000

== See also ==
- List of public signage typefaces
- Typefaces used on North American traffic signs
