= Giuseppe Montalbano (1925–2021) =

Italian politician (1925–2021)

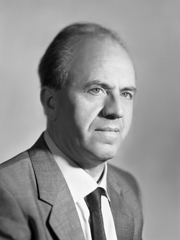
- Montalbano as a Senator

Member of the Senate of the Republic of Italy
- In office 20 June 1979 – 1 July 1987
- Constituency: Sciacca

Mayor of Sambuca di Sicilia
- In office 1964–1980

Personal details
- Born: 7 June 1925 Sciacca, Italy
- Died: 15 August 2021 (aged 96) Palermo, Italy
- Party: PCI

Giuseppe Montalbano (7 June 1925 – 15 August 2021) was an Italian politician. A member of the Italian Communist Party (PCI), he served as Mayor of Sambuca di Sicilia from 1964 to 1980 and was a Senator from 1979 to 1987.

== Biography ==
In 1944, Montalbano was elected to the provincial secretariat of the Italian Communist Youth Federation alongside Francesco Renda. The following year, he joined the federation's federal committee. In 1960, he was elected to the Municipal Council of Sambuca di Sicilia, and was elected Mayor four years later. He led reconstruction efforts following the 1968 Belice earthquake alongside other mayors of nearby municipalities.

In 1979, Montalbano was elected Senator in the constituency of Sciacca with 26,403 votes. While in the Senate, he served on the Telecommunications Committee and the Mercantile Navy and Transport Committee. He was re-elected in 1983 with 27,288 votes.

In 2003, Montalbano wrote his first book, Ricordi di un comunista. The book traced 70 years of history in Sambuca di Sicilia.

Giuseppe Montalbano died in Palermo on 15 August 2021 at the age of 96.
