= Giuseppe Montalbano (1895–1989) =

Italian politician

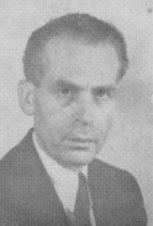
Giuseppe Montalbano Portrait

Giuseppe Montalbano (19 June 1895 – 29 October 1989) was an Italian politician.

Montalbano was born in Santa Margherita di Belice. He studied and taught law. A member of the Italian Communist Party, Montalbano served on the National Council convened after World War II had ended. He was elected to its successor, the Constituent Assembly. Between 1955 and 1959, Montalbano sat on the Sicilian Regional Assembly.
