= Manual on Uniform Traffic Control Devices =

National traffic control manual of the Federal Highway Administration

Manual on Uniform Traffic Control Devices for Streets and Highways
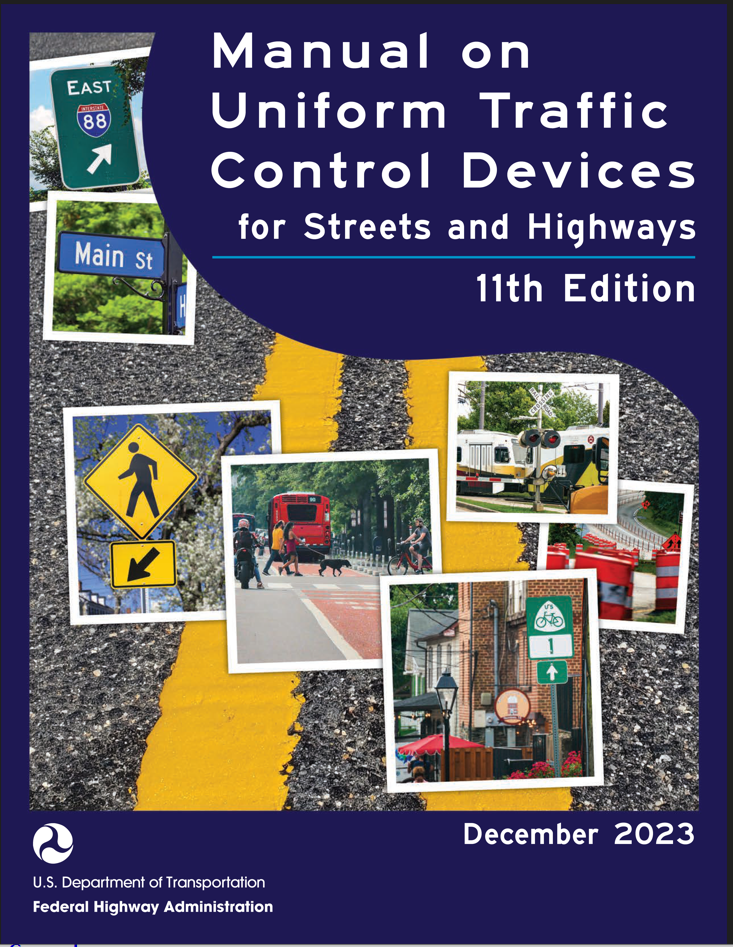
- Authors: National Committee on Uniform Traffic Control Devices; Federal Highway Administration
- Published: December 2023
- Publisher: Federal Highway Administration
- Publication date: 1935; 91 years ago
- Publication place: United States
- Website: mutcd.fhwa.dot.gov

The Manual on Uniform Traffic Control Devices for Streets and Highways (usually referred to as the Manual on Uniform Traffic Control Devices, abbreviated MUTCD) is a document issued by the Federal Highway Administration (FHWA) of the United States Department of Transportation (USDOT) to specify the standards by which traffic signs, road surface markings, and signals are designed, installed, and used. Federal law requires compliance by all traffic control signs and surface markings on roads "open to public travel", including state, local, and privately owned roads (but not parking lots or gated communities). While some state agencies have developed their own sets of standards, including their own MUTCDs, these must substantially conform to the federal MUTCD.

The MUTCD defines the content and placement of traffic signs, while design specifications are detailed in a companion volume, Standard Highway Signs and Markings. This manual defines the specific dimensions, colors, and fonts of each sign and road marking. The National Committee on Uniform Traffic Control Devices (NCUTCD) advises FHWA on additions, revisions, and changes to the MUTCD. The current release of the MUTCD is the 11th edition released in December 2023.

The United States is among the countries that have not ratified the Vienna Convention on Road Signs and Signals. The first edition of the MUTCD was published in 1935, 33 years before the Vienna Convention was signed in 1968, and 4 years before World War II started in 1939. The MUTCD differs significantly from the European-influenced Vienna Convention, and an attempt to adopt several of the Vienna Convention's standards during the 1970s led to confusion among many US drivers.

== History ==
=== Early 20th century ===
At the start of the 20th century—the early days of the rural highway—each road was promoted and maintained by automobile clubs of private individuals, who generated revenue through club membership and increased business along cross-country routes. However, each highway had its own set of signage, usually designed to promote the highway rather than to assist with travelers' direction and safety. Conflicts between these clubs frequently led to multiple sets of signs—sometimes as many as eleven—being erected on the same highway.

Government involvement did not occur until the late 1910s and early 1920s, when groups from Indiana, Minnesota, and Wisconsin began surveying roads to develop signage standards. They reported their findings to the Mississippi Valley Association of Highway Departments, which adopted their suggestions for the shapes of road signs in 1922. These suggestions included using a circle for railroad crossings, an octagon to signify a stop, a diamond for ordinary conditions of danger, a square for intermittent danger conditions, and a rectangle for regulatory or directional information.

In January 1925, Thomas Harris MacDonald, chief of the federal Bureau of Public Roads, published an article in which he argued that developing highway transportation in the United States to the "highest degree" would require five major innovations. Among them were "uniform markings and signs" and a "uniform color code". MacDonald argued that "drastic enforcement of uniform rules" as to "all those matters of law, regulation and safety devices which involve the human attributes in the operation of the vehicle" would improve safety on American highways, because in emergency situations, a driver and his vehicle must react as one on the basis of "reflex" and there is no time to think.

In January 1927, the American Association of State Highway Officials (AASHO) published the Manual and Specifications for the Manufacture, Display, and Erection of U.S. Standard Road Markers and Signs to set standards for traffic control devices used on rural roads. Despite the title, this manual did not have any guidance on pavement markings; at the time, the meaning of the now-obsolete phrase "road marker" overlapped with what modern speakers would call a "sign". In 1930, the National Conference on Street and Highway Safety (NCSHS) published the Manual on Street Traffic Signs, Signals, and Markings, which set similar standards for urban settings, but also added specific guidance on traffic signals, pavement markings, and safety zones. Although the two manuals were quite similar, in 1931 both organizations formed a Joint Committee to develop a uniform standard for both urban streets and rural roads; this standard was the MUTCD.

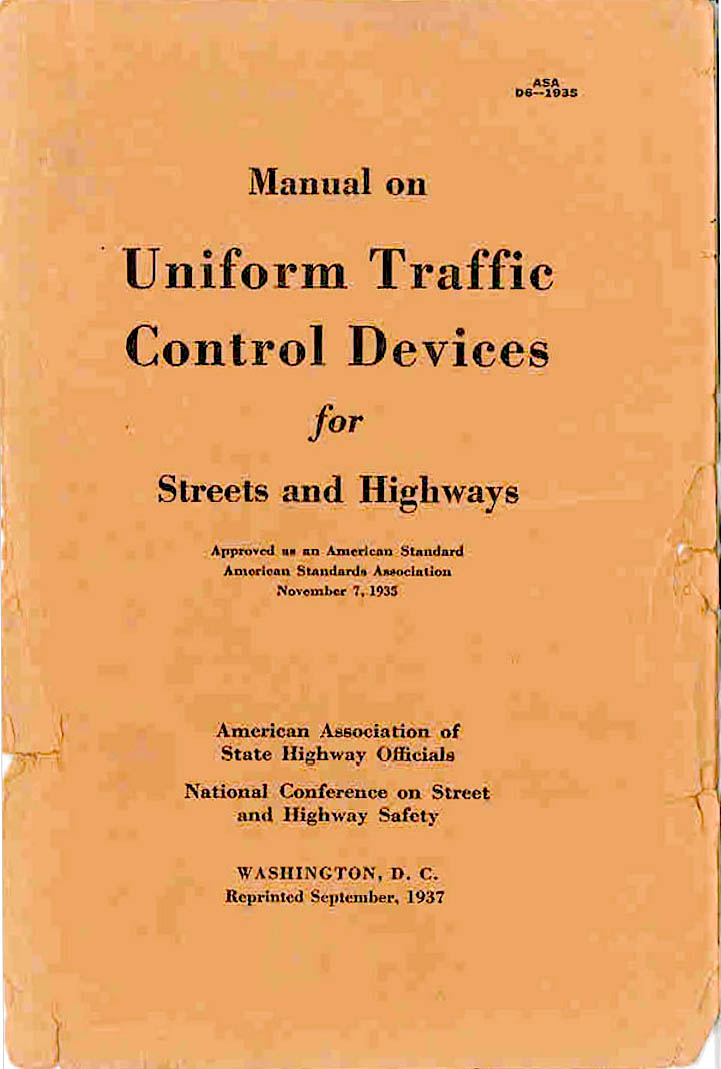
Cover of the 1937 typeset reprint of the first edition of the MUTCD published in 1935

The original edition of the Manual on Uniform Traffic Control Devices for Streets and Highways was published in 1935 as a mimeographed document. In 1937, the manual was republished as a typeset document.

In 1942, the Joint Committee was expanded to include the Institute of Transportation Engineers (ITE), then known as the Institute of Traffic Engineers. During World War II, the second edition of the MUTCD was released as a War Emergency Edition. This included information on traffic control under blackout conditions and how to conserve materials needed for the war effort.

In 1948, three years after World War II ended, the third edition of the MUTCD was released. This edition had a different format and structure than the previous editions. Several road signs first assumed their current appearance in this edition. The most controversial issue during the early years of the MUTCD had been the color of center lines on roads. The 1948 MUTCD settled on white, but recommended yellow for double center lines on multi-lane highways and for center lines in no-passing zones.

=== Mid-20th century ===
In 1949, the United Nations Conference on Road and Motor Transport launched a research project to develop a worldwide uniform signage scheme. In 1951, the UN conducted experiments in the US to compare the effectiveness of national traffic sign standards from around the world. Signs from six countries were placed along the road for test subjects to gauge their legibility at a distance. The test strips were located along Ohio State Route 104 near Columbus, U.S. Route 250 and Virginia State Route 53 near Charlottesville, Minnesota State Highway 101 near Minneapolis, and other roads in New York. France, Chile, Turkey, India, and Southern Rhodesia reciprocated by installing MUTCD signs on their roads. In the US, the experiments attracted unexpected controversy and curious onlookers who posed a hazard. By September 1951, the experts working on the project were in favor of the American proposals for stop signs (at the time, black "STOP" text on a yellow octagon), "cross road", "left or right curve", and "intersection", but were still struggling to reach consensus on symbols for "narrow road", "bumpy or uneven surface", and "steep hill".

In 1953, after cooperating with the UN conference's initial experiments, the United States declined to sign or ratify the UN's then-proposed protocol for a worldwide system of uniform road signs. There were two major reasons behind this decision. First, most U.S. roads and streets were (and still are) under state jurisdiction. Second, the United States was developing modern controlled-access highways at the time (culminating in the creation of the Interstate Highway System in 1956), and the novel problems presented by such new high-speed highways required rapid innovations in road signing and marking "that would definitely be impaired by adherence to any international code". Despite the Americans' withdrawal from the research project, the experiments eventually resulted in the Vienna Convention on Road Signs and Signals of 1968.

The 1954 revision of the 1948 MUTCD changed the standard color of stop signs from yellow to red.

In 1960, the National Joint Committee on Uniform Traffic Control Devices was again reorganized to include representatives of the National Association of Counties and the National League of Cities, then known as the American Municipal Association. In 1961, the MUTCD was again revised to make yellow center lines mandatory for the two exceptions where they had previously been recommended. The 1961 edition was the first edition to provide for uniform signs and barricades to direct traffic around road construction and maintenance operations.

During the 1960s, United States Senator Abraham Ribicoff emerged as a prominent national advocate for highway safety, having previously championed the issue as governor of Connecticut. In an essay published in the July 1965 edition of The Atlantic Monthly, he argued that a lack of uniform standards between states contributed to highway deaths. For example, two of the worst deviations from the majority rule that no passing should be marked with a solid center line were Pennsylvania, which marked no-passing zones only with signs and not center lines, and Georgia, which marked them only with a yellow line on the shoulder.

In 1966, Congress passed the Highway Safety Act, Pub. L. 89–564, 72 Stat. 885, which is now codified at 23 U.S.C. § 401 et seq. It required all states to create a highway safety program by December 31, 1968, and to adhere to uniform standards promulgated by the U.S. Department of Transportation (USDOT) as a condition of receiving federal highway-aid funds. The penalty for non-compliance was a 10% reduction in funding. In turn, taking advantage of broad rulemaking powers granted in 23 U.S.C. § 402, the Department simply adopted the entire MUTCD by reference at 23 CFR 655.603. (5 U.S.C. § 552(a)(1), also enacted in 1966, authorizes federal agencies to incorporate by reference technical standards published elsewhere, which means the agency may merely cite the standard and need not republish its entire text as part of the appropriate regulation.) Thus, what was formerly a quasi-official project became an official one. States are allowed to supplement the MUTCD but must remain in "substantial conformance" with the national MUTCD and adopt changes within two years after they are adopted by FHWA.

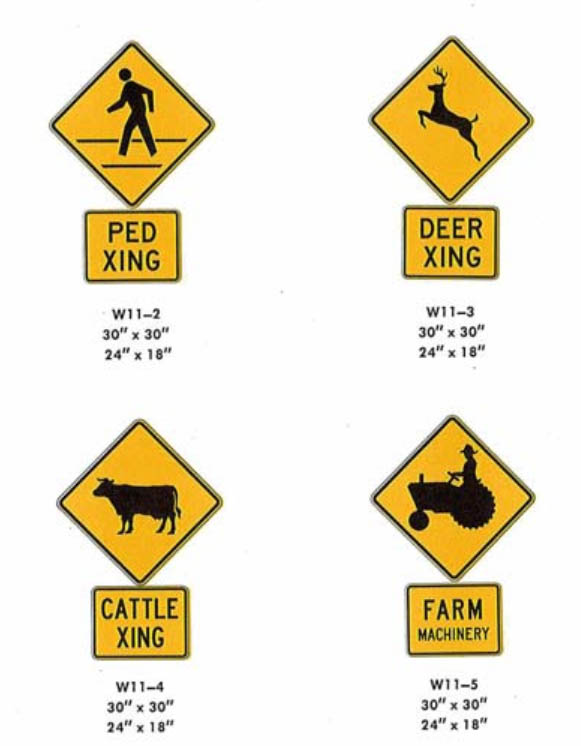
Warning signs introduced in the 1971 edition, combining both symbols and words

The 1971 edition of the MUTCD included several significant standards. The MUTCD imposed a consistent color code for road surface markings by requiring all center lines dividing opposing traffic on two-way roads to be always painted in yellow (instead of white, which was to always demarcate lanes moving in the same direction), and also required that all highway guide signs (not just those on interstate highways) contain white text on a green background. Orange was introduced as the standard color for traffic control in work zones.

Another major change in the 1971 MUTCD, inspired by the Vienna Convention, was a preference to adopt symbols on signs in lieu of words "as rapidly as public acceptance and other considerations permit." During what was then expected to be a transition period, the MUTCD allowed state highway departments to use optional explanatory word plaques with symbol signs and to continue using the previous standard word message signs in certain cases. Robert Conner, the chief of the traffic control systems division of the Federal Highway Administration during the 1970s, believed that symbol signs were "usually more effective than words in situations where reaction time and comprehension are important." Conner was active in the Joint Committee and also represented the United States at international meetings on road traffic safety. However, several American traffic safety experts were concerned that American drivers would not understand the Vienna Convention's symbols, which is why the MUTCD allowed for explanatory word plaques. Most of the repainting to the 1971 standard was done between 1971 and 1974, with a deadline of 1978 for the changeover of both the markings and signage.

The draw bridge warning sign (left) is one of the several signs under the MUTCD that remain text-only, while its equivalent under the Vienna Convention (right) displays a symbol of an open draw bridge.

The U.S. adoption of several Vienna Convention-inspired symbol signs during the 1970s was a failure. For example, the lane drop symbol sign was criticized as baffling to U.S. drivers—who saw a "big milk bottle"—and therefore quite dangerous, since by definition it was supposed to be used in situations where drivers were about to run out of road and needed to merge into another lane immediately. American highway safety experts ridiculed it as the "Rain Ahead" sign. Many American motorists were bewildered by the Vienna Convention's symbol sign with two children on it, requiring it to be supplemented with a "School Xing" plaque. (The American "School Xing" symbol was later redesigned to depict an adult crossing together with a child.) However, several signs from the Vienna Convention were successfully adopted into the 1971 MUTCD, including the red "Yield" sign, which replaced the previous yellow version, and the "Do Not Enter" sign, which replaced a word-only version. Because the Vienna Convention version was circular, it was given a square backing to conform with the MUTCD shape for regulatory signs, and the words "DO NOT ENTER" were superimposed to ensure American driver comprehension.

The 1971 MUTCD's preference for a rapid transition to symbols over words were removed in the 1978 MUTCD. After 1971, FHWA formally assumed responsibility for publishing the MUTCD. The 1971 MUTCD was revised eight times. In 1978, the MUTCD physical format was changed to a ring binder whose revisions were published as replacement pages (i.e., an interfiled looseleaf service). The 1978 MUTCD was subject to four revisions, and the subsequent 1988 MUTCD was subject to seven revisions.

=== 21st century ===
The 2000 MUTCD was the first to be available on the internet and to use metric units. Due to a number of significant flaws, the 2003 MUTCD was envisioned primarily for the purpose of addressing errata in the 2000 MUTCD. The 2000 and 2003 MUTCDs each eliminated a symbol sign that had long been intended to replace a word message sign: "Pavement Ends" (in 2000) and "Narrow Bridge" (in 2003).

The tenth edition of the MUTCD was published in 2009, with revisions in 2012. This was the first editing to cover traffic control devices on private property.

The Infrastructure Investment and Jobs Act (IIJA) of 2021 required the USDOT to update the MUTCD every four years, and the eleventh edition was released in 2023. This edition allowed painted red bus lanes, rules allowing more crosswalks and traffic signals, new rules for determining speed limits, signage for shoulders that are used part-time as traffic lanes, and new signage for electric vehicle charging stations and autonomous vehicles. It also added painted green bike lanes, bike boxes, and bike-specific traffic lights. Rectangular Rapid-Flashing Beacons (RRFBs) were also added to the MUTCD; a pedestrian beacon for uncontrolled intersections consisting of two rectangular lights, side-by-side, which alternate flashing, under a yellow diamond with a walking person on it, above an arrow pointing out the crosswalk. RRFBs were previously on interim approval by FHWA since March 20, 2018. Transportation safety advocates criticized the changes as not going far enough to deal with a substantial spike in pedestrian fatalities, especially guidance setting speed limits based on the 85th percentile of actual driving speeds.

== Development ==
Proposed additions and revisions to the MUTCD are recommended to FHWA by the National Committee on Uniform Traffic Control Devices (NCUTCD), a private, non-profit organization. The NCUTCD also recommends interpretations of the MUTCD to other agencies that use the MUTCD, such as state departments of transportation. NCUTCD develops public and professional awareness of the principles of safe traffic control devices and practices and provides a forum for qualified individuals to exchange professional information.

The NCUTCD is supported by twenty-one sponsoring organizations, including transportation and engineering industry groups (such as AASHTO and ASCE), safety organizations (such as the National Safety Council and Advocates for Highway and Auto Safety), and the American Automobile Association. Each sponsoring organization promotes members to serve as voting delegates within the NCUTCD.

== Adoption ==
Map showing state adoption of the 2009 MUTCD: Adopted national MUTCD Adopted national MUTCD with state supplement Adopted state-specific MUTCD

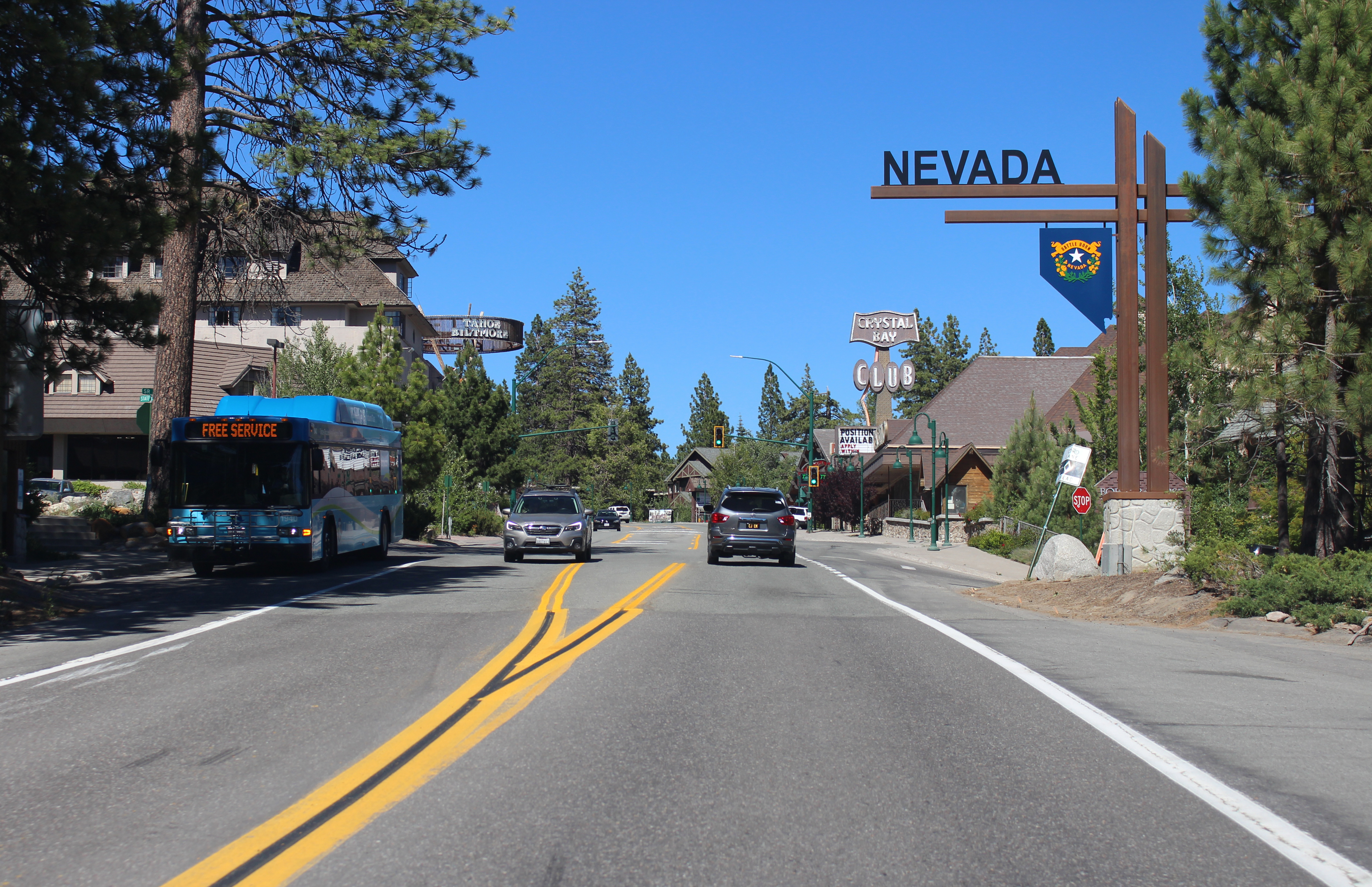
An example of state-by-state variations: California (foreground) paints a black line to help drivers see a double yellow line demarcating opposing traffic, while Nevada (background) does not

Eighteen states have adopted the national MUTCD as is. Twenty-two states, the District of Columbia, Puerto Rico, and the United States Department of Defense through the Military Surface Deployment and Distribution Command (SDDC) have all adopted supplements to the MUTCD. Ten states have adopted their own editions of the MUTCD "in substantial conformance to" an edition of the national MUTCD, annotated throughout with state-specific modifications and clarifications. The Guam Department of Public Works has also adopted the MUTCD in some form.

The following state-specific MUTCD editions are currently in effect:

- California Department of Transportation: California Manual on Uniform Traffic Control Devices (CA MUTCD)
- Delaware Department of Transportation: Delaware Manual on Uniform Traffic Control Devices (DE MUTCD)
- Indiana Department of Transportation: Indiana Manual on Uniform Traffic Control Devices (IMUTCD)
- Maryland State Highway Administration: Maryland Manual on Uniform Traffic Control Devices (MdMUTCD)
- Michigan Department of Transportation: Michigan Manual on Uniform Traffic Control Devices (MMUTCD)
- Minnesota Department of Transportation: Minnesota Manual on Uniform Traffic Control Devices (MN MUTCD)
- Missouri Department of Transportation: Engineering Policy Guide (EPG), section 900
- Ohio Department of Transportation: Ohio Manual of Uniform Traffic Control Devices (OMUTCD)
- Texas Department of Transportation: Texas Manual on Uniform Traffic Control Devices (TMUTCD)
- Utah Department of Transportation: Utah Manual on Uniform Traffic Control Devices (Utah MUTCD)

== Enforcement ==
Federal funding is tied to compliance and serves as an enforcement mechanism for state and local governments. For private property owners, FHWA recommends "encouragement" rather than punishment. The use of non-compliant devices can also create liability in tort lawsuits for private owners and some governments.

From 2014 to 2018, New York placed over 500 non-compliant "I Love New York" tourism destination signs along its highways and expressways to encourage tourists to visit nearby destinations, especially those in economically depressed Upstate New York. FHWA contended that the signs violated numerous MUTCD rules, along with the general principle of the MUTCD that signs should be simple so that they are "easy to identify, comprehend and understand in a matter of seconds as you are driving". After FHWA threatened to withhold $14 million in federal funding, New York removed the signs in November 2018.

== Other jurisdictions ==
Under the MUTCD, the standard speed limit sign (left) used only in the United States includes the words "speed limit" above the number (which is in mph), while the standard one under the Vienna Convention (right) only requires the number which is used in most countries (which is mostly in km/h).

The United States is among the majority of countries around the world that have not ratified the Vienna Convention on Road Signs and Signals (based primarily on European signage traditions), and the MUTCD differs significantly from the Vienna Convention. Apart from the 1971 effort to adopt several Vienna Convention-inspired symbol signs (as explained above), achieving worldwide uniformity in traffic control devices was never a priority for AASHTO because the number of motorists driving regularly on multiple continents was relatively small during the 20th century.

Warning signs (alerting drivers of unexpected or hazardous conditions) tend to be more verbose than their Vienna Convention counterparts. On the other hand, MUTCD guide signs (directing or informing road users of their location or of destinations) tend to be less verbose, since they are optimized for reading at high speeds on freeways and expressways.

The MUTCD lacks a mandatory sign group like the Vienna Convention does, a separate category for those signs like "Right Turn Only" and "Keep Right" that tell traffic what it must do instead of what it must not do. Instead, the MUTCD primarily classifies them with the other regulatory signs that inform drivers of traffic regulations.

== See also ==
- Comparison of MUTCD-influenced traffic signs
- Comparison of traffic signs in English-speaking territories
- Road signs in the United States
- Traffic Signs Regulations and General Directions, for the UK
