= Clearview (typeface) =

Humanist sans-serif typeface

- Category: Sans-serif
- Designers: Donald Meeker; James Montalbano; Christopher O'Hara; Harriet Spear
- Foundry: Terminal Design Inc.
- Date created: 2003
- License: Proprietary
- Sample

Clearview, also known as Clearview Hwy, is the name of a humanist sans-serif typeface family for guide signs used on roads in the United States, Canada, Indonesia, the Philippines, Israel, Panama, Brazil and Sri Lanka. It was developed by independent researchers with the help of the Texas A&M Transportation Institute and the Pennsylvania Transportation Institute, under the supervision of the Federal Highway Administration (FHWA). It was once expected to replace the FHWA typefaces ("Highway Gothic") in many applications, although newer studies of its effectiveness have called its benefits into question.

Initial testing indicated that Clearview was two to eight percent more legible in both day- and night-time viewing than the prior typeface on overhead signs, particularly benefiting older drivers, with a six percent increase in legibility distance. A design goal of Clearview was the reduction of irradiation effects of retroreflective sign materials. Reduced nighttime overglow or haloing was expected also to improve recognition rates for computer road sign detection. However, these tests also compared new signs in Clearview to existing, weathered signs in the prior typeface. The new font's apparent legibility "was more due to the fact that older, worn signs were being replaced with nice, fresh, clean signs which were, naturally, more legible." Better testing also revealed that legibility was worse for negative contrast signs (dark lettering on light backgrounds) such as on speed limit and yellow warning signs.

== History ==
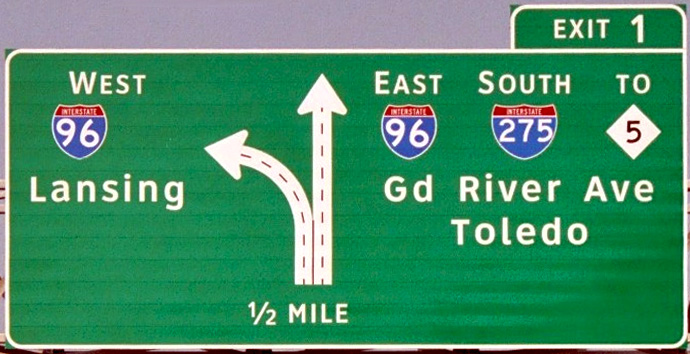
A highway sign using Clearview in Farmington Hills, Michigan, near the terminus of westbound I-696 (2005)

The standard FHWA typefaces, developed in the 1940s, were designed to work with a system of highway signs in which almost all words are capitalized; its standard mixed-case form (Series E Modified) was designed to be most visible under the now-obsolete reflector system of button copy, which has since been superseded by retroreflective sheeting. The designers of Clearview sought to create a typeface adapted for mixed-case signage, initially expecting it would be based on an existing European sans-serif typeface. Instead, using a similar weight to the FHWA fonts, a new font was created from scratch. Two key differences are much larger counter spaces, the enclosed spaces in letters like the lower case "e" or "a", and a higher x-height, the relative height of the lower case "x" to the upper case "X". Smaller counter spaces in the FHWA fonts reduced legibility, particularly when the letters glowed from headlight illumination at night.

== Official acceptance ==
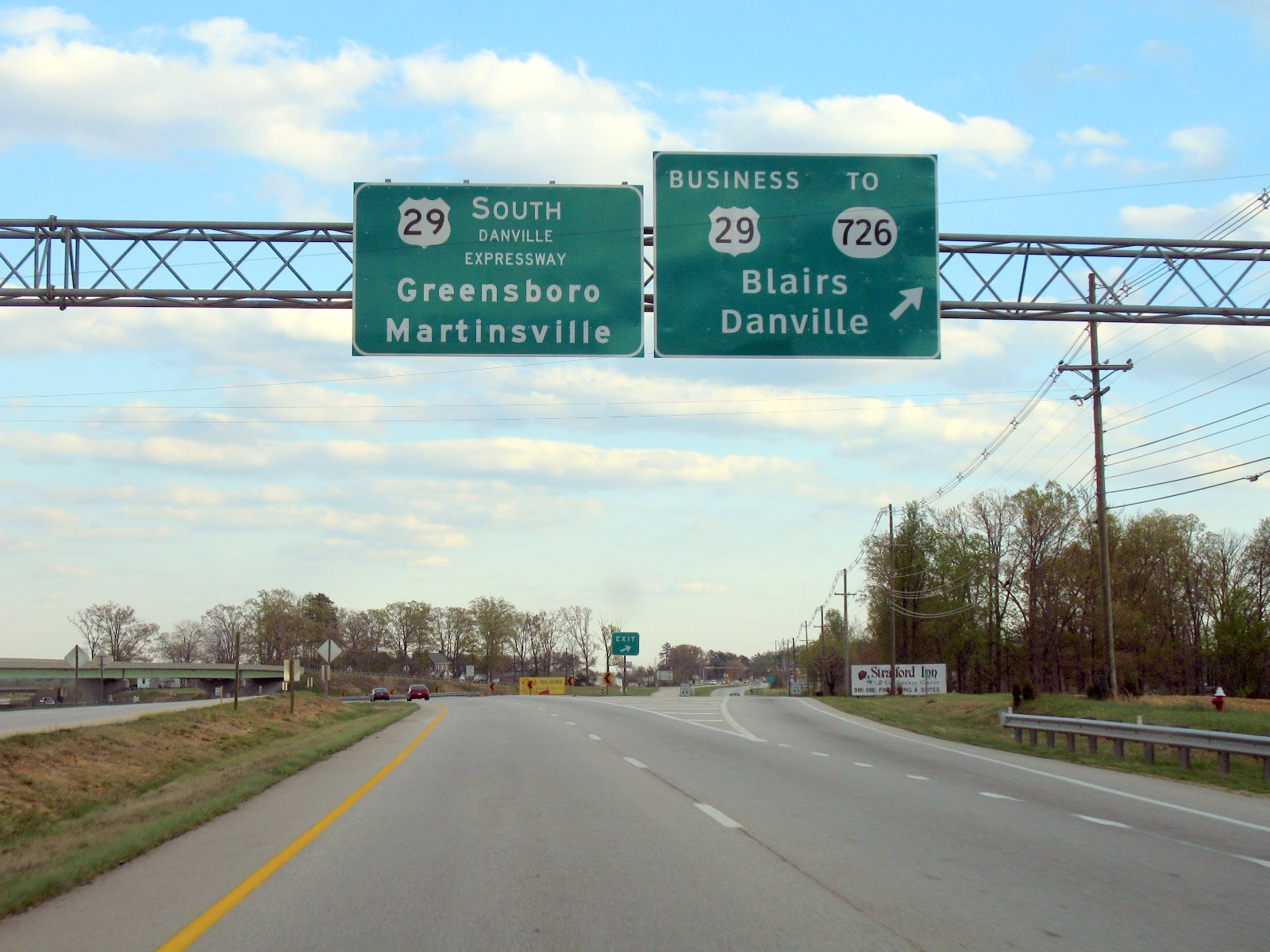
Highway signs in Danville, Virginia, using both Highway Gothic (left) and Clearview (right) fonts

Clearview was granted interim approval by the FHWA for use on positive-contrast road signs (white legend on a green, blue, or brown background) on September 2, 2004, though not on negative-contrast road signs (dark legend on light background, such as black on white, yellow or orange), given its inferior legibility to the existing FHWA typefaces in these applications. The FHWA also refused to add Clearview to the 2009 MUTCD, citing lack of testing on Clearview's numerals, symbols, and narrower typefaces. In January 2016, FHWA rescinded the interim approval to use Clearview. Congress ordered the agency to reinstate the interim approval on March 28, 2018. The application of Clearview on guide signs vary by state.

Outside the US, Clearview has been adopted in Canada where it has been the standard typeface for signs in British Columbia since 2006 and used for street signs in Toronto. Clearview has been adopted as the standard typeface for road signs in Indonesia since 2014. Since 2016, Ontario's Ministry of Transportation has started using Clearview on some signs on the Queen Elizabeth Way.

== Variants ==
In addition to its appearance on road signage, a customized version of the ClearviewText typeface was adopted by AT&T for corporate use, including advertising, used from 2006 to 2016. Since 2018, Toyota has used another variant of ClearviewText in its advertisements. ClearviewText and ClearviewADA are versions of the typeface intended for use in general graphic design and ADA-compliant signage. An example of ClearviewADA in use is signage at Dallas/Fort Worth International Airport.

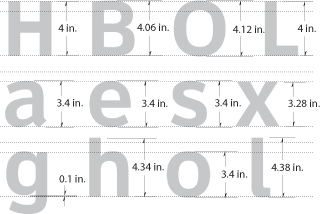
An example of the Clearview typeface.

== Adoption ==
=== United States ===
Between 20 and 30 states have adopted the use of the typeface as of 2013. It was not the official font recommended for use by the FHWA and states were required to request interim approval from the Federal Highway Administration to use the font.

On January 25, 2016, the Federal Highway Administration issued a notice in the Federal Register of the agency's intent to rescind interim approval for use of the Clearview font in 30 days. FHWA discussed the current state of road signage research and concluded that "the consistent finding among all the research evaluations is that the brightness of the retroreflective sheeting is the primary factor in nighttime legibility." Even worse, significant misunderstandings and misapplications of the interim approval for Clearview were resulting in badly designed non-uniform signs that violated the uniformity central to the Manual on Uniform Traffic Control Devices. Accordingly, the notice concluded, "FHWA does not intend to pursue further consideration, development, or support of an alternative letter style." The rescission of the interim approval drew negative response from government officials as well as one of the typeface's designers.

The FHWA reinstated the interim approval on March 28, 2018, per Division L, Title I, Section 125 of the Consolidated Appropriations Act, 2018.

=== Canada ===
The Transportation Association of Canada's MUTCD for Canada allows the use of Clearview, and the Ministry of Transportation of Ontario uses it for positive contrast guide signs. The Ontario transportation agency Metrolinx has adopted Clearview for its wayfinding design standard. Toronto has been replacing its black-on-white street signs with newer white-on-blue signs that use Clearview since 2004, with exceptions for certain older neighborhoods. British Columbia has been switching to Clearview for all signage, including regulatory and guide signage. Alberta road signs use Clearview (including positive and negative contrast) unless otherwise indicated.

=== Indonesia ===
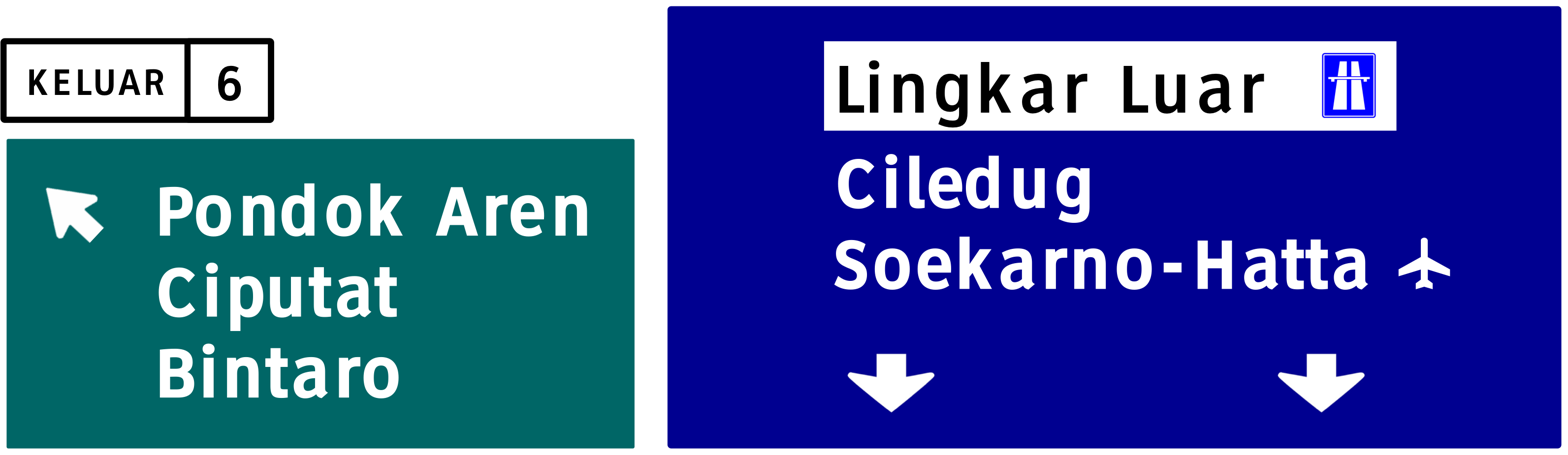
Highway signs using Clearview in Indonesia

The Ministry of Transportation promulgated a regulation in 2014 to introduce new road signs that would use the Clearview typeface. This new regulation was intended to meet ASEAN Economic Community standards starting in 2015. Previously, road signs in Indonesia had traditionally used FHWA Series fonts since 1993.

=== Philippines ===
Signage in the Philippines uses Clearview on newer signs. The numbered shields in the Philippine highway network use Clearview.

== See also ==
- List of public signage typefaces
