= Road junction =

Location where two or more roads meet

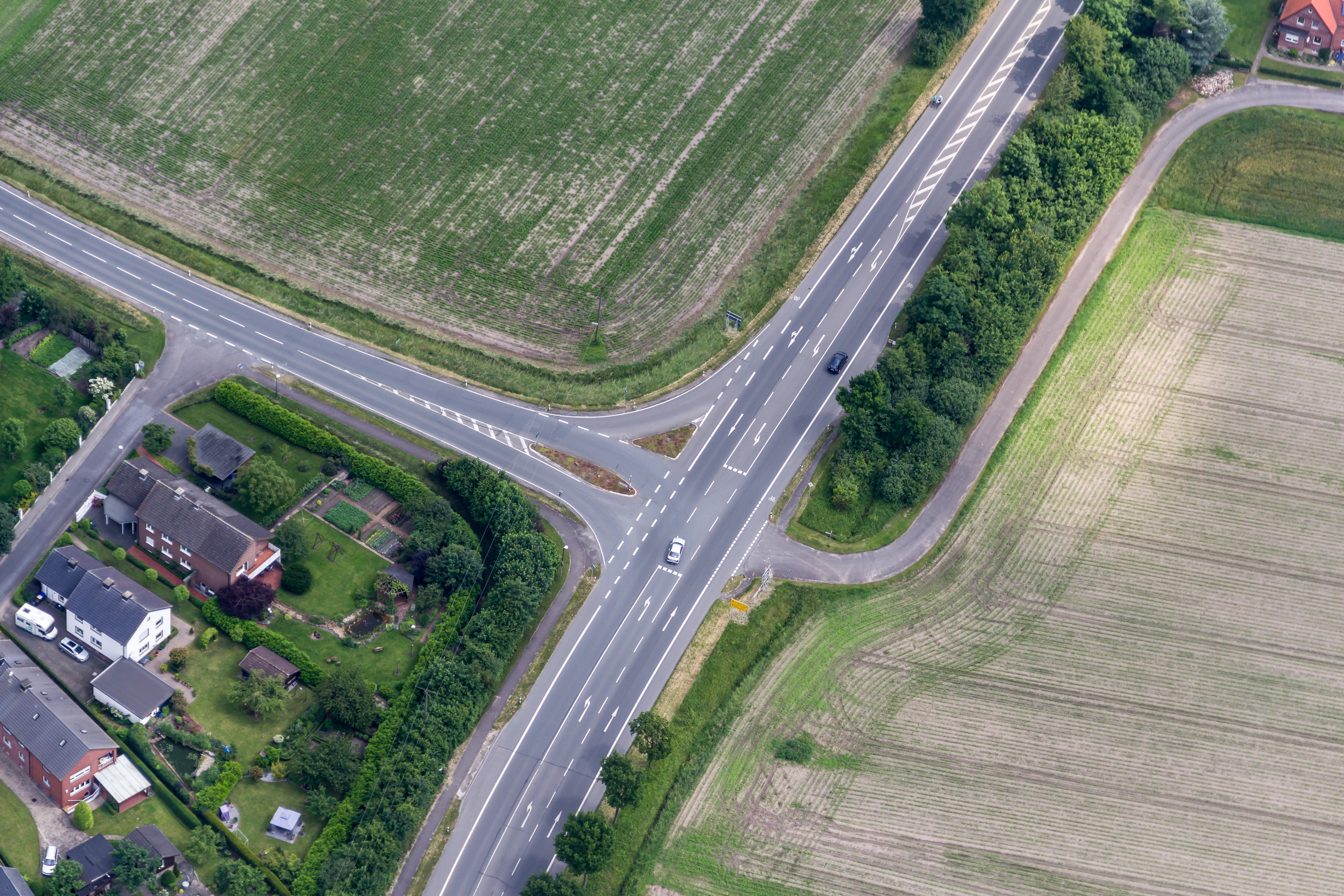
Junction of several roads in Lüdinghausen, Germany

A road junction is a type of junction where two or more roads meet. It can refer to intersections, where such roads cross at-grade, or interchanges, where roads can pass over one another, and traffic manoeuvres between roads through the use of slip lanes alongside traffic lights. The design of a road junction depends heavily on traffic volumes and safety concerns. Designs should take into account not only the fluidity of traffic flows, but also pedestrian paths and bike lanes amongst other factors.

== History ==
Roads are a means of transport, historically linking locations such as towns, forts and geographic features such as river fords. Where roads met outside of an existing settlement, these junctions often led to a new settlement. Scotch Corner is an example of such a location.

In the United Kingdom and other countries, the practice of giving names to junctions emerged, to help travellers find their way. Junctions often took the name of a prominent nearby business or a point of interest.

As road networks and traffic flows increased in density, managing the flow of traffic through junctions became of increasing importance, to minimize delays and improve safety. The first innovation was to add traffic control devices, such as stop signs and traffic lights that regulated traffic flow. Next came lane controls that limited what each lane of traffic was allowed to do while crossing. Turns across oncoming traffic might be prohibited, or allowed only when oncoming and crossing traffic was stopped.

This was followed by specialized junction designs that incorporated information about traffic volumes, speeds, driver intent and many other factors.

== Types ==
The most basic distinction among junction types is whether or not the roads cross at the same or different elevations. More expensive, grade-separated interchanges generally offer higher throughput at higher cost. Single-grade intersections are lower cost and lower throughput. Each main type comes in many variants.

=== Interchange ===
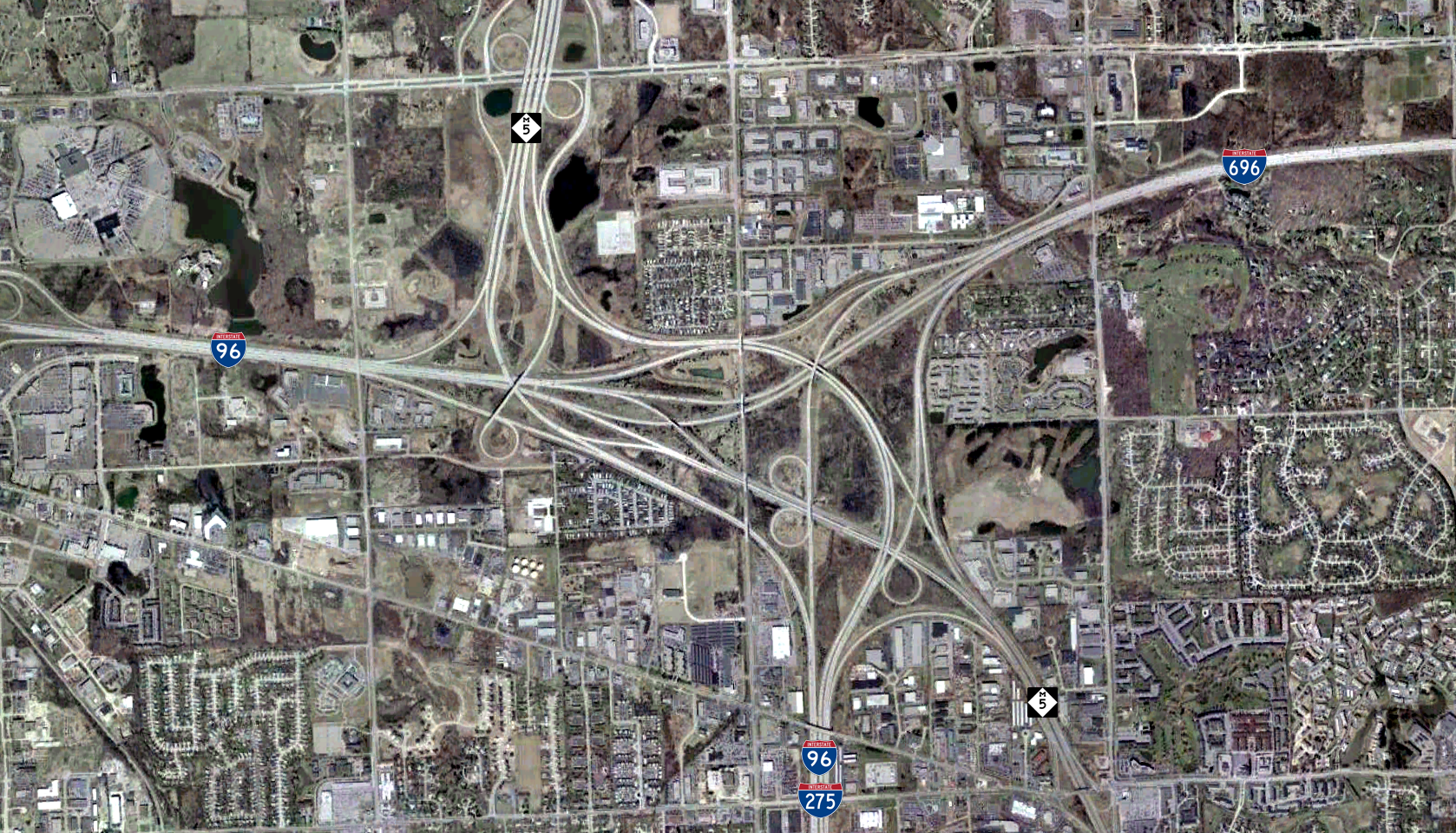
A "mixing bowl" highway interchange between I-96, M-5, I-275, and I-696 in Novi, Michigan, United States

At interchanges, roads pass above or below each other, using grade separation and slip roads. The terms motorway junction and highway interchange typically refer to this layout. They can be further subdivided into those with and without signal controls.

Signalized (traffic-light controlled) interchanges include "diamond" designs such as the regular diamond, diverging diamond, three-level diamond, and tight diamond. Others include the contraflow left, single-point urban, and partial cloverleaf interchanges.

Non-signalized designs include both free-flow interchanges and non-free-flow ones. Free-flow variants include the cloverleaf, stack, double crossover merging, and windmill. Non-free-flow variants include the dogbone (featuring two raindrop roundabouts), dumbbell (featuring two standard roundabouts), and roundabout interchange (featuring one large roundabout).

Autobahnkreuz (literally "autobahn cross"), short form Kreuz, and abbreviated as AK, is a four-way interchange on the German autobahn network. Autobahndreieck (literally "autobahn triangle"), short form Dreieck, and abbreviated as AD, is a three-way interchange on the German autobahn network.

=== Intersection ===
At intersections, roads cross at-grade. They also can be further subdivided into those with and without signal controls.

Signalized designs include the advanced stop line, bowtie, box junction, continuous-flow, double-wide, hook turn, jughandle, Michigan left (median U-turn), paired, quadrant, seagull (continuous green T), slip lane, split, staggered, superstreet, and Texas T.

Non-signalized designs include the Maryland T/J, roundabout, and traffic circle, as well as the Texas U-turn (a type of turnaround) and unsignalized variations on the continuous-flow (3-leg and 4-leg), median U-turn, and superstreet.

== Safety ==
In the EU, it is estimated that around 5,000 of the 26,100 car crash fatalities in 2015 occurred in a junction collision, while it was around 8,000 in 2006. Therefore, during the 2006–2015 decade, around 20% of EU road fatalities occurred at junctions. Among these junction fatalities, 34% were car users, 23% were pedestrians, 21% were motorcyclists, 12% were cyclists, and the remaining were other types of road users.

=== Causes of fatalities ===
It has been considered that several causes might lead to fatalities; for instance:

- Observation missed – the largest category, encompassing all factors that cause a driver or rider to not notice something:
  - Physical factors:
    - Temporary obstruction to view
    - Permanent obstruction to view
    - Permanent sight obstruction
  - Human factors:
    - Faulty diagnosis – a misunderstanding of another road user's actions or the road conditions
    - Distraction
    - Inadequate plan – the details of the situation, as interpreted by the road user, are lacking in quantity and/or quality (including their correspondence to reality)
    - Inattention
- Faulty diagnosis (not leading to observation missed)
  - Information failure – the road user judged the situation incorrectly and made a decision based upon the incorrect judgement (e.g. thinking that another vehicle is moving when it is not, and thus colliding with it)
  - Communication failure – a miscommunication between road users
- Inadequate plan (not leading to observation missed)
  - Insufficient knowledge

== Protected intersections ==
=== Bicycles ===
Protected intersection design based on a common Dutch model, preserving the physical segregation of the cycle lane throughout the intersection

A number of features make this protected intersection much safer. A corner refuge island, a setback crossing of the pedestrians and cyclists, generally between 1.5–7 metres of setback, a forward stop bar, which allows cyclists to stop for a traffic light well ahead of motor traffic who must stop behind the crosswalk. Separate signal staging or at least an advance green for cyclists and pedestrians is used to give cyclists and pedestrians no conflicts or a head start over traffic. The design makes a right turn on red, and sometimes left on red depending on the geometry of the intersection in question, possible in many cases, often without stopping.

Cyclists ideally have a protected bike lane on the approach to the intersection, separated by a concrete median with splay kerbs if possible, and have a protected bike lane width of at least 2 metres if possible (one way). In the Netherlands, most one way cycle paths are at least 2.5 metres wide.

Bicycle traffic can be accommodated with the low grade bike lanes in the roadway or higher grade and much safer protected bicycle paths that are physically separated from the roadway.

In Manchester, UK, traffic engineers have designed a protected junction known as the Cycle-Optimised Signal (CYCLOPS) Junction. This design places a circulatory cycle track around the edge of the junction, with pedestrian crossing on the inside. This design allows for an all-red pedestrian / cyclist phase with reduced conflicts. Traffic signals are timed to allow cyclists to make a right turn (across oncoming traffic) in one turn). It also allows for diagonal crossings (pedestrian scramble) and reduces crossing distances for pedestrians.

=== Pedestrians ===
Intersections generally must manage pedestrian as well as vehicle traffic. Pedestrian aids include crosswalks, pedestrian-directed traffic signals ("walk light") and over/underpasses. Walk lights may be accompanied by audio signals to aid the visually impaired. Medians can offer pedestrian islands, allowing pedestrians to divide their crossings into a separate segment for each traffic direction, possibly with a separate signal for each.

== See also ==
- List of road junctions in the United Kingdom
