= Slip lane =

Road at a junction which allows turning vehicles to bypass the intersection

Illustration (right-hand traffic): the blue vehicle in the slip lane must normally give way to the green and red vehicles once they are on the horizontal road.

In road design, a slip lane is a road at a junction that allows road users to change roads without actually entering an intersection. Slip lanes are helpful for intersections designed for large buses or trucks to physically make a turn in the space allotted, or where the right turn is sharper than a 90 degree turn. Slip lanes may reduce congestion and "T-bone" motor vehicle collisions, but they increase the risk for pedestrians, cyclists and horse riders who cross the slip lane.

Some intersections that are controlled by traffic light offer a slip lane, which allows users to bypass the lights when they turn. That helps ease congestion and improves journey times, as people who are turning do not have to stop at the light but can continue at the same speed. There are two types of slip lanes at intersections: slip lanes that end and require traffic to merge to join the main road, and slip roads that continue onto the main road as another traffic lane.

== Terminology ==
They are known as "slip roads” or “filter lanes" in the United Kingdom. In right-turn countries, they may be called "channelized right-hand turn lanes."

== Rules ==
In Australia, before entering a slip road, drivers must look to ensure that their blind spots are clear of other motorists, cyclists, and pedestrians. Drivers must then give way to any pedestrians crossing the slip road. Before joining the main road from a slip road, drivers must give way to all other traffic even if they are faced with a give-way or with other traffic controls.

== Pedestrians ==
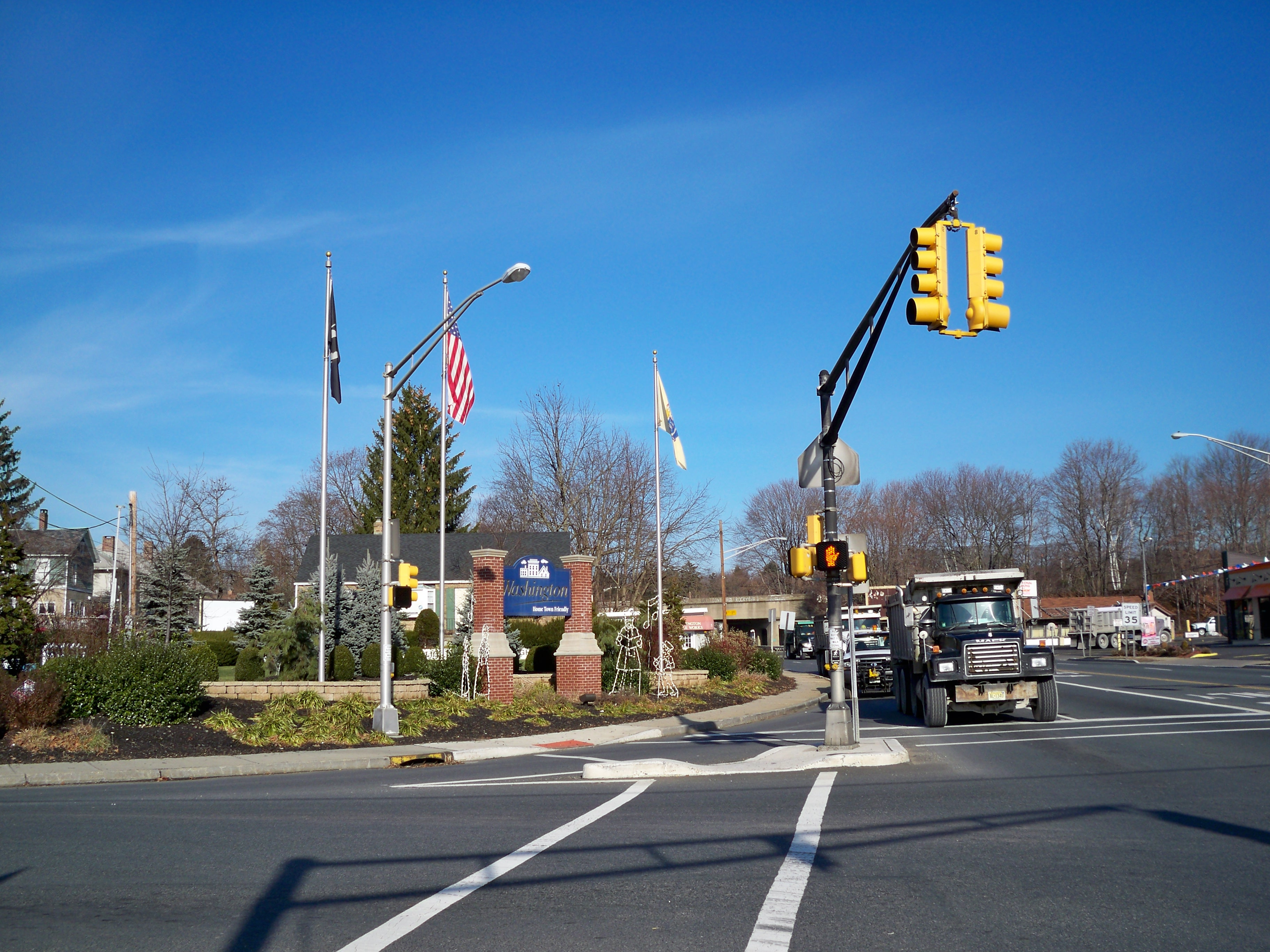
A right-turn slip lane in the United States (center of photo), including a pedestrian crossing.

In countries such as the United Kingdom in which partial conflicts between pedestrians and vehicular traffic are not permitted, slip lanes can be used as part of a "walk with traffic" facility. Normally, pedestrian signals in the UK operate on a full pedestrian stage in which all traffic is held at red, and all pedestrian crossings are given a green signal. With a slip lane, pedestrians can cross to the triangular island during the vehicle red phase and cross the road while the traffic from their approach has a green light.

The Federal Highway Administration (FHWA) in United States has indicated that to accommodate safe pedestrian crossings, intersections should be designed using tight curb radii, shorter crossing distances, and other tools. While right-turn slip lanes are generally a negative facility from the pedestrian perspective due to the emphasis on easy and fast vehicle travel, they can be designed to be less problematic.

The transport standard for the Design of Roads and Streets in New South Wales, Australia recommend against installing new slip lanes at intersections with "high place function and high pedestrian activity". If determined necessary to install, installations must prioritise pedestrian safety by installing a raised crossing.

The organisation Strong Towns argues that slip lanes exist only to prioritise the speed of motor traffic, and it calls for the removal of slip lanes on local streets.

== Safety ==
According to the US Federal Highway Administration, "slip lanes are generally a negative facility from the pedestrian perspective due to the emphasis on easy and fast vehicle travel". The Global Street Design Guide states slip lanes are "provided at intersections of major urban roads to facilitate vehicle turn to the detriment of pedestrian safety".

When poorly designed, slip lanes can be a dangerous design element. For reasons of urban design and pedestrian safety, many road-controlling authorities are actively removing them in urban and suburban settings. Slip lanes may need to be removed if considerations such as pedestrian safety grow to a point that they override the desire to facilitate free passage for drivers. Slip lanes reduce drivers’ awareness of crossing pedestrians because they are led to focus on the traffic stream into which they are merging, and also impair visibility of the traffic stream because of the angle of approach. They also greatly increase crossing complexity for pedestrians and cyclists, by increasing total crossing distance, requiring judgement about crossing fast-moving traffic without the benefit of a traffic signal. To minimise risks of collision, slip lanes can be shaped to enter the traffic flow at an angle higher than 45 degrees. Such lanes are called high-entry angle slip lanes.

Designers of slip lanes may try to increase pedestrian safety by including a range of features. These may include a raised island for pedestrians with a curb and ramps for wheelchair users. To encourage drivers to slow down for crossing pedestrians, edge lines or painted cross-hatching may be used to narrow the driver's perceived width of the lane. As well, pedestrian safety in the crosswalk may be improved with high-visibility crosswalk striping, flashing beacons, and/or signage and raised crosswalks. Flashing warning beacons may be desirable in locations where there are high traffic volumes and vehicle speeds. Some states in the United States require a stop sign at slip lanes to control entry to the main roadway.

In Australia and New Zealand, slip lanes with zebra crossings are over-represented in pedestrian collision statistics.

== See also ==
- Interchange
- Advanced stop line
- Continuous-flow intersection
- Hook turn
- Quadrant roadway intersection
- Seagull intersection
- Superstreet
- Texas T
- Texas U-turn
- Turnaround
