= Free right turn =

Free right turn may refer to:

- An intersection where turn on red is not prohibited
- A slip lane that permits an unsignalized right turn
