= Intersection (road) =

Road junction where two or more roads either meet or cross at grade

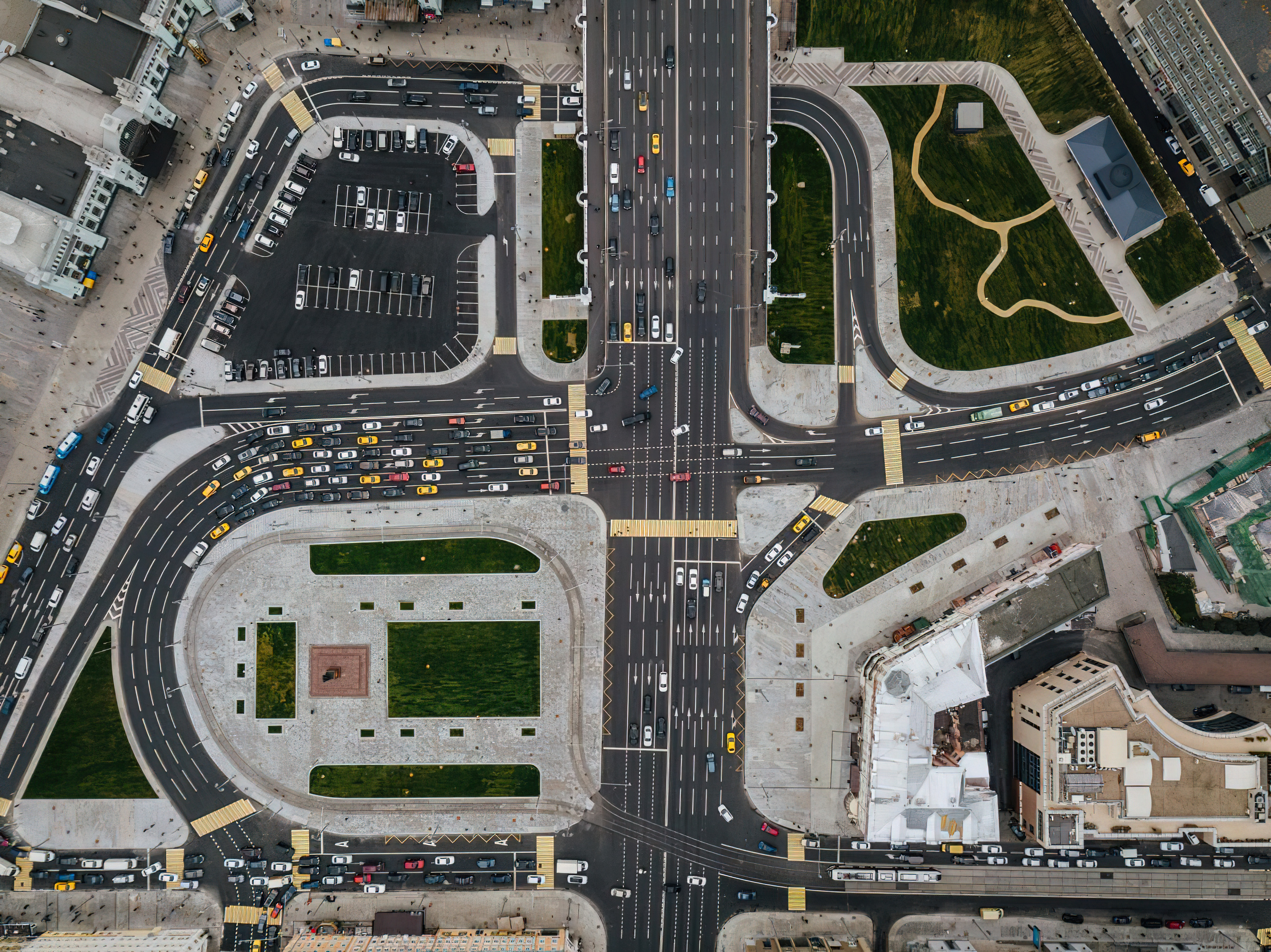
Intersection at Tverskaya Zastava Square in Moscow, Russia

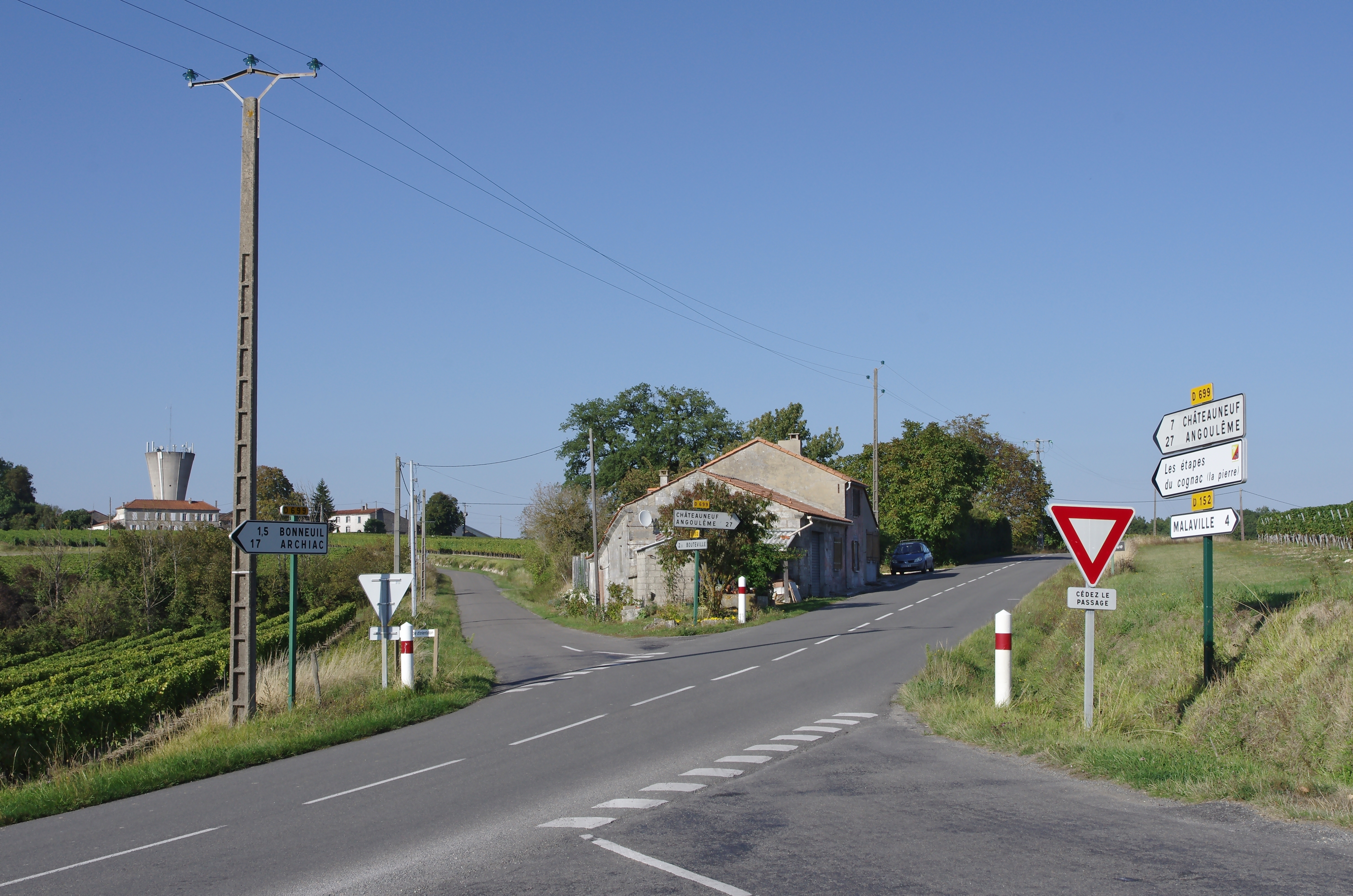
An intersection in rural Grande Champagne, France

An intersection, crossroads, or at-grade junction is a junction where two or more roads converge, diverge, meet or cross at the same height, as opposed to an interchange, which uses bridges or tunnels to separate different roads. Major intersections are often delineated by gores and may be classified by road segments, traffic controls and lane design.

This article primarily reflects practice in jurisdictions where vehicles are driven on the right. If not otherwise specified, "right" and "left" can be reversed to reflect jurisdictions where vehicles are driven on the left.

== Types ==
=== Road segments ===
One way to classify intersections is by the number of road segments (arms) that are involved.

- A three-way intersection is a junction between three road segments (arms): a T junction when two arms form one road, or a Y junction, the latter also known as a fork if approached from the stem of the Y.

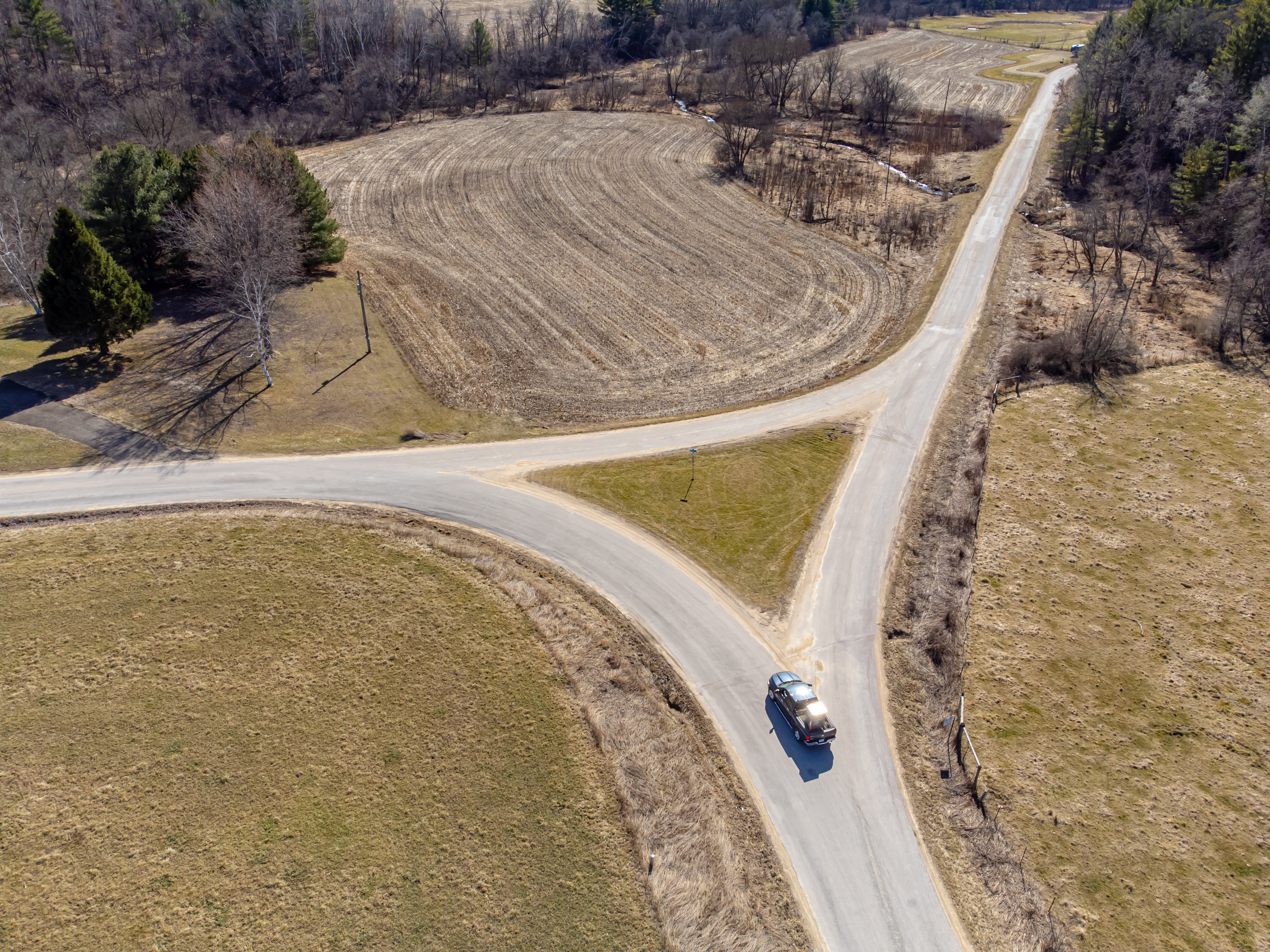
Fork in the road Y-junction

- A four-way intersection, or crossroads, usually involves a crossing over of two streets or roads. In areas where there are blocks and in some other cases, the crossing streets or roads are perpendicular to each other. However, two roads may cross at a different angle. In a few cases, the junction of two road segments may be offset from each when reaching an intersection, even though both ends may be considered the same street.
- Six-way intersections usually involve a crossing of three streets at one junction; for example, a crossing of two perpendicular streets and a diagonal street is a rather common type of 6-way intersection.
- Five, seven or more approaches to a single intersection, such as at Seven Dials, London, are not common.

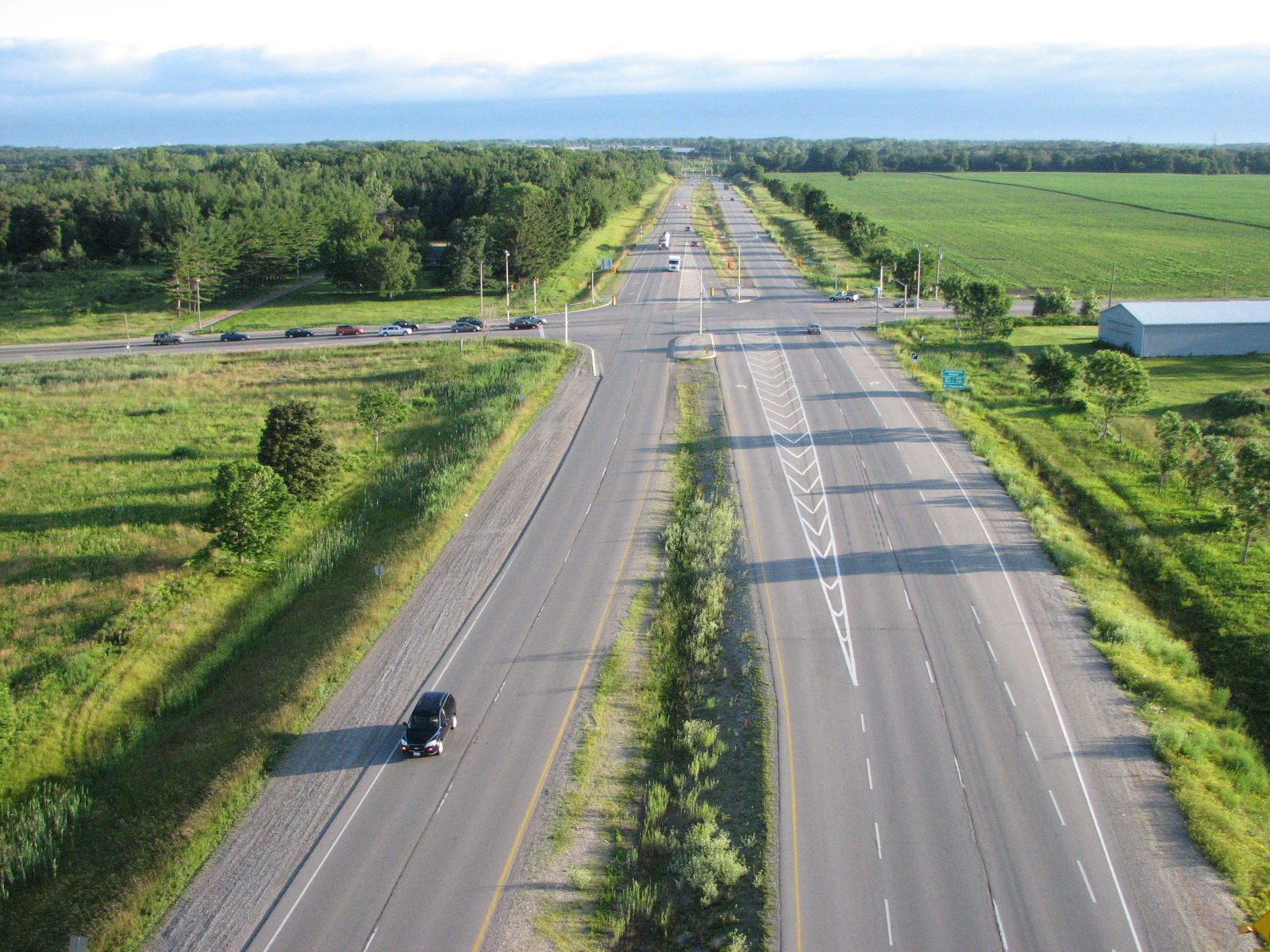
Intersection along the Veterans Memorial Parkway, an at-grade limited-access road in London, Ontario

=== Traffic controls ===
Another way of classifying intersections is by traffic control technology:

- Uncontrolled intersections, without signs or signals (or sometimes with a warning sign). Priority (right-of-way) rules may vary by country: on a 4-way intersection traffic from the right often has priority; on a 3-way intersection either traffic from the right has priority again, or traffic on the continuing road. For traffic coming from the same or opposite direction, that which goes straight has priority over that which turns off.
- Yield-controlled intersections may or may not have specific "YIELD" signs (known as "GIVE WAY" signs in some countries).
- Stop-controlled intersections have one or more "STOP" signs. Two-way stops are common, while some countries also employ four-way stops.
- Signal-controlled intersections depend on traffic lights, usually electric, which indicate which traffic is allowed to proceed at any particular time.

=== Lane design ===
- A traffic circle is a type of intersection at which traffic streams are directed around a circle. Types of traffic circles include roundabouts, "mini-roundabouts", "rotaries", "STOP"-controlled circles, and signal-controlled circles. Some people consider roundabouts to be a distinct type of intersection from traffic circles (with the distinction based on certain differences in size and engineering).
- A box junction can be added to an intersection, generally prohibiting entry to the intersection unless the exit is clear.
- Some (unconventional or alternative) intersections employ indirect left turns to increase capacity and reduce delays. The Michigan left combines a right turn and a U-turn. Jughandle lefts diverge to the right, then curve to the left, converting a left turn to a crossing maneuver, similar to throughabouts. These techniques are generally used in conjunction with signal-controlled intersections, although they may also be used at stop-controlled intersections.
- Other designs include advanced stop lines, parallel-flow and continuous-flow intersections, hook turns, quadrants, seagull intersections, slip lanes, staggered junctions (junctions consisting of two opposing T-junctions where one road intersects two sideroads located diagonally opposite each other; in American English referred to as doglegs), superstreets, Texas Ts, Texas U-turns and turnarounds.
- A roundabout and its variants like turbo roundabouts, bowties and distributing circles like traffic circles and right-in/right-out (RIRO) intersections.

== Turns ==
At intersections, turns are usually allowed, but are often regulated to avoid interference with other traffic. Certain turns may be not allowed or may be limited by regulatory signs or signals, particularly those that cross oncoming traffic. Alternative designs often attempt to reduce or eliminate such potential conflicts.

=== Turn lanes ===
At intersections with large proportions of turning traffic, turn lanes (also known as turn bays) may be provided. For example, in the intersection shown in the diagram, left turn lanes are present in the right-left street.

Turn lanes allow vehicles, to cross oncoming traffic (i.e., a left turn in right-side driving countries, or a right turn in left-side driving countries), or to exit a road without crossing traffic (i.e., a right turn in right-side driving countries, or a left turn in left-side driving countries). Absence of a turn lane does not normally indicate a prohibition of turns in that direction. Instead, traffic control signs are used to prohibit specific turns.

Turn lanes can increase the capacity of an intersection or improve safety. Turn lanes can have a dramatic effect on the safety of a junction. In rural areas, crash frequency can be reduced by up to 48% if left turn lanes are provided on both main-road approaches at stop-controlled intersections. At signalized intersections, crashes can be reduced by 33%. Results are slightly lower in urban areas.

Turn lanes are marked with an arrow bending into the direction of the turn which is to be made from that lane. Multi-headed arrows indicate that vehicle drivers may travel in any one of the directions pointed to by an arrow.

=== Turn signals ===
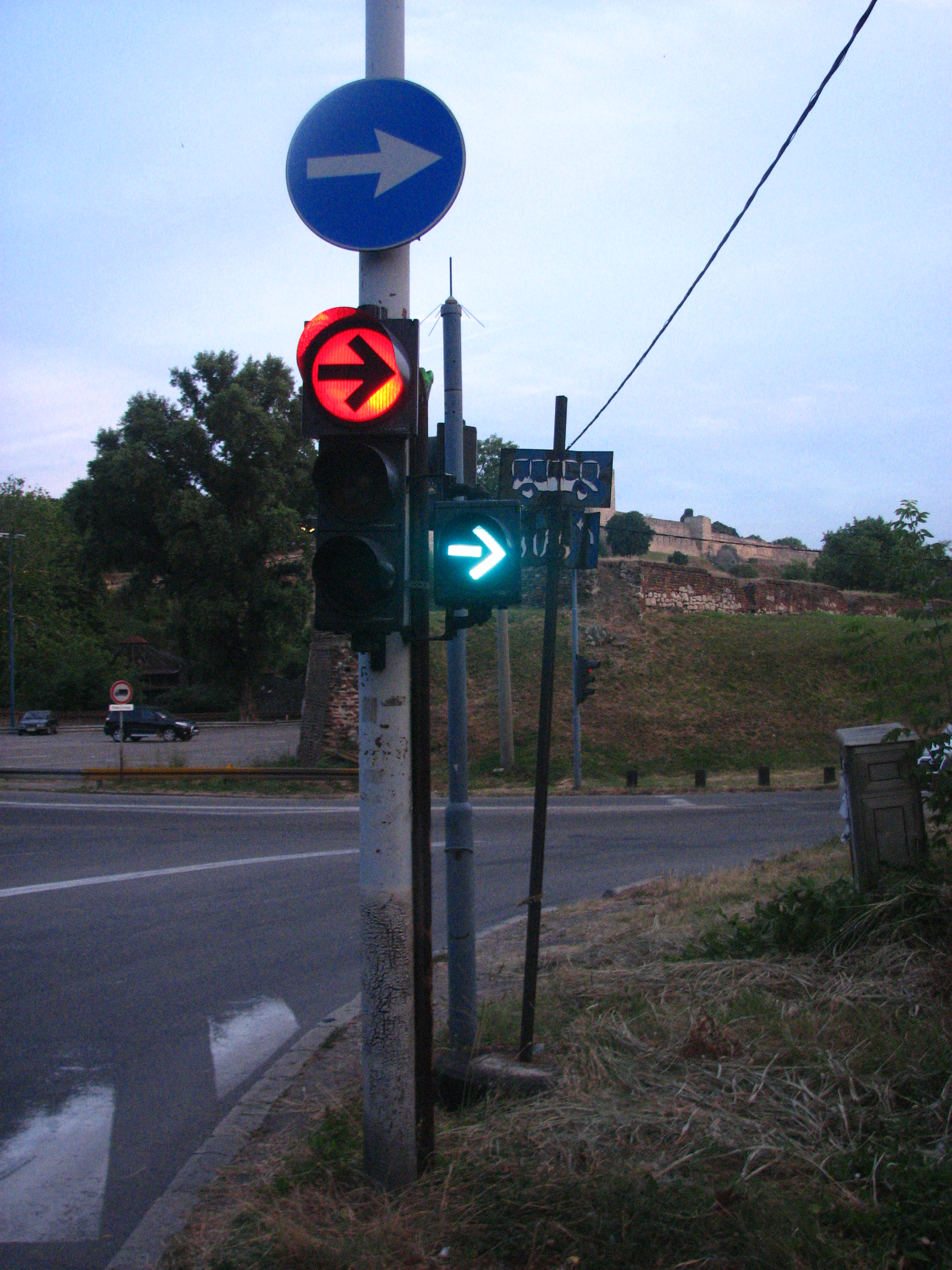
"Right turn on red" traffic light in Belgrade, Serbia. Right turn only after pedestrians and traffic pass from left.

Traffic signals facing vehicles in turn lanes often have arrow-shaped indications. North America uses various indication patterns. Green arrows indicate protected turn phases, when vehicles may turn unhindered by oncoming traffic. Red arrows may be displayed to prohibit turns in that direction. Red arrows may be displayed along with a circular green indication to show that turns in the direction of the arrow are prohibited, but other movements are allowed. In some jurisdictions, a red arrow prohibits a turn on red. In Europe, if different lanes have differing phases, red, yellow and green traffic lights corresponding to each lane have blacked-out areas in the middle in the shape of arrows indicating the direction(s) drivers in that lane may travel in. This makes it easier for drivers to be aware which traffic light they need to pay attention to. A green arrow may also be provided; when it is on, drivers heading in the direction of the arrow may proceed, but must yield to all other vehicles. This is similar to the right turn on red in the US.

Disadvantages to turn lanes include increased pavement area, with associated increases in construction and maintenance costs, as well as increased amounts of stormwater runoff. They also increase the distance over which pedestrians crossing the street are exposed to vehicle traffic. If a turn lane has a separate signal phase, it often increases the delay experienced by oncoming through traffic. Without a separate phase, left crossing traffic does not get the full safety benefit of the turn lane.

=== Lane management ===
Alternative intersection configurations, formerly called unconventional intersections, can manage turning traffic to increase safety and intersection throughput. These include the Michigan left/Superstreet (RCUT/MUT) and continuous flow intersection (CFI/DLT), to improve traffic flow, and also interchange types like Diverging diamond interchange (DDI/DCD) design as part of the Federal Highway Administration's Every Day Counts initiative which started in 2012.

Diagram of an example intersection of two-way streets as seen from above (traffic flows on the right side of the road). The east-west street has left turn lanes from both directions, but the north-south street does not have left turn lanes at this intersection. The east-west street traffic lights also have green left turn arrows to show when unhindered left turns can be made. Some possible markings for crosswalks are shown as examples.

== Vulnerable road users ==
Vulnerable road users include pedestrians, cyclists, motorcyclists, and individuals using motorized scooters and similar devices. Compared to people who are in motor vehicles (like cars and trucks), they are much more likely to suffer catastrophic or fatal injuries at an intersection.

=== Pedestrians ===
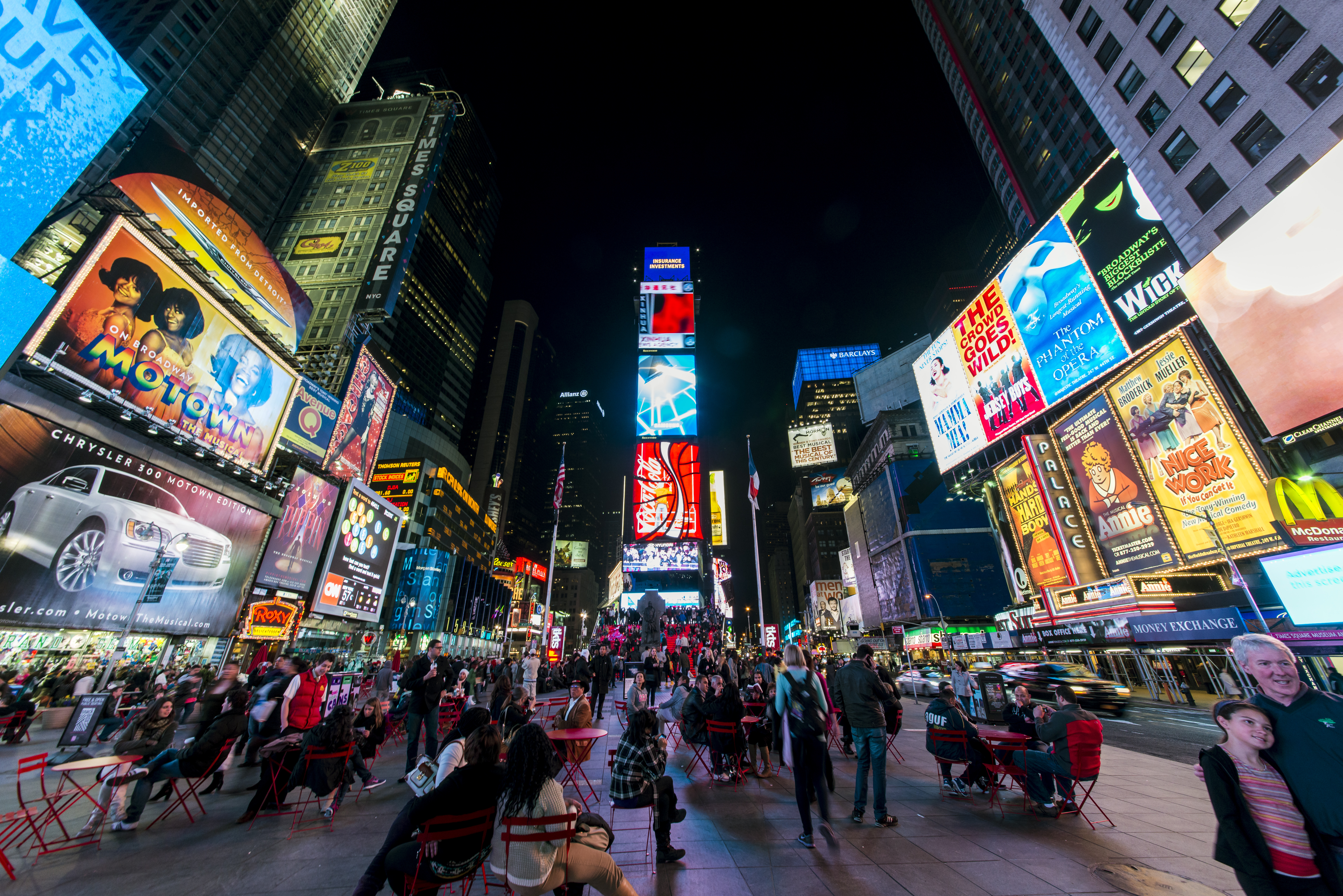
Times Square is the hub of the Broadway theater district and a major cultural venue in Midtown Manhattan, New York City. The pedestrian intersection also has one of the highest annual attendance rates of any tourist attraction in the world, estimated at 60 million.

Intersections generally must manage pedestrian as well as vehicle traffic. Pedestrian aids include crosswalks, pedestrian-directed traffic signals ("walk light") and over/underpasses. Traffic signals can be time consuming to navigate, especially if programmed to prioritise vehicle flow over pedestrians, while over and underpasses which rely on stairs are inaccessible to those who can not climb them. Walk lights may be accompanied by audio signals to aid the visually impaired. Medians can offer pedestrian islands, allowing pedestrians to divide their crossings into a separate segment for each traffic direction, possibly with a separate signal for each.

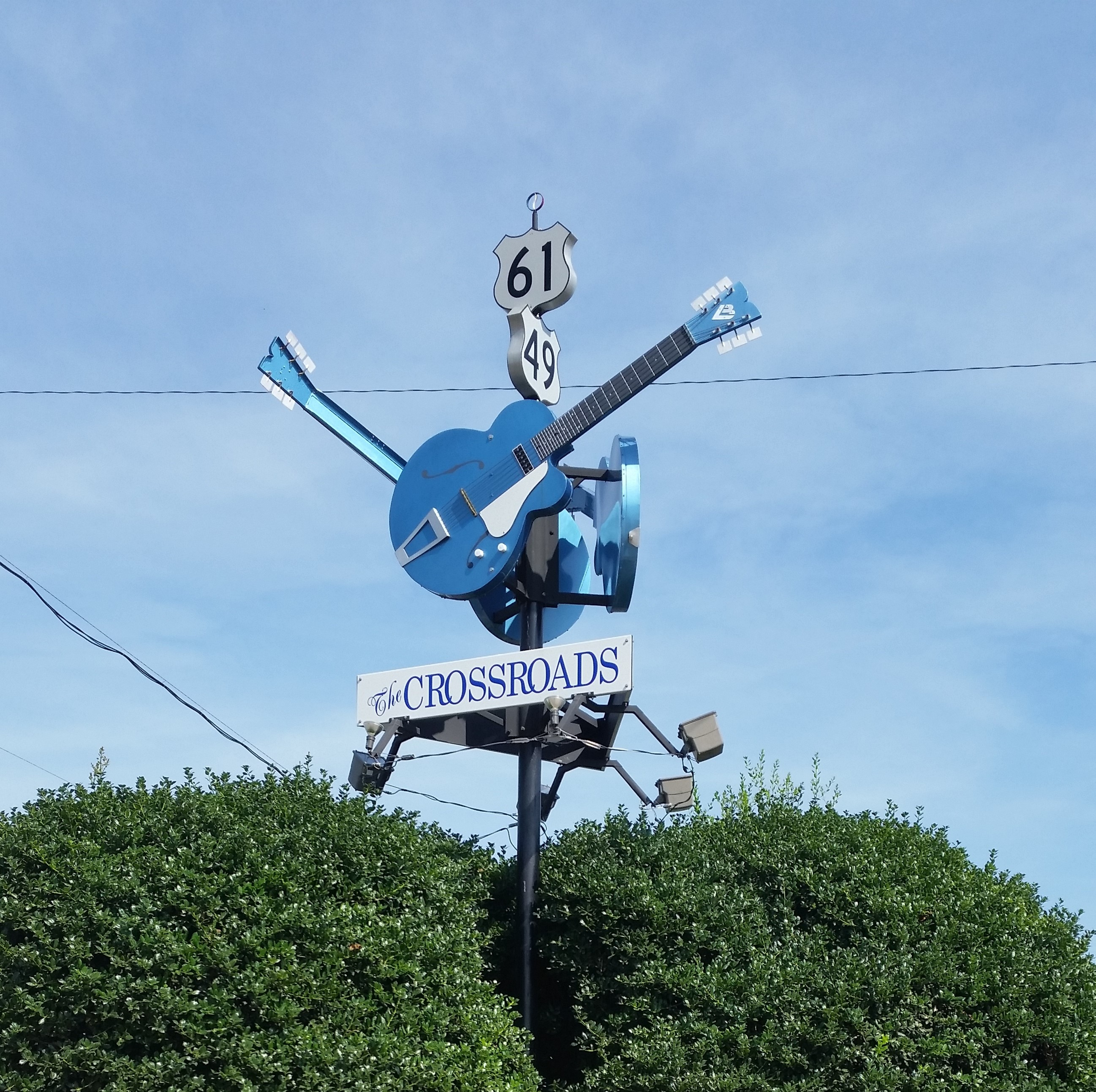
Famous intersection of Highways 61 and 49 in Clarksdale, Mississippi sung about by Robert Johnson

Some intersections display red lights in all directions for a period of time. Known as a pedestrian scramble, this type of vehicle all-way stop allows pedestrians to cross safely in any direction, including diagonally. All green for non motorists is known from the crossing at Shibuya Station, Tokyo.

In 2020, NHTSA reported that more than 50% of pedestrian deaths in the United States (3,262 total) were attributed to failure to yield the right of way-- which typically occurs at intersections.

=== Cyclists and motorcyclists ===
Poor visibility at junctions can lead to drivers colliding with cyclists and motorcyclists. Some junctions use advanced stop lines which allow cyclists to filter to the front of a traffic queue which makes them more visible to drivers.

== Safety ==
A European study found that in Germany and Denmark, the most important crash scenario involving vulnerable road users was:

- motor vehicle turning right/left while cyclist going straight;
- motor vehicle turning right/left while pedestrian crossing the intersection approach.

These findings are supported by data elsewhere. According to the U.S. National Highway Traffic Safety Administration, roughly half of all U.S. car crashes occurred at intersections or were intersection related in 2019.

== At grade railways ==
In the case of railways or rail tracks the term at grade applies to a rail line that is not on an embankment nor in an open cut. As such, it crosses streets and roads without going under or over them. This requires level crossings. At-grade railways may run along the median of a highway. The opposite is grade-separated. There may be overpasses or underpasses.

== See also ==
- Gore (road) – Triangular plot of land used in traffic infrastructure
- Grade separation – Type of road junction
- Interchange (road) – Road junction that uses grade separation
- Junction (road) – Location where two or more roads meet
- Junction (traffic) – Location where traffic can change
- Roundabout – Traffic intersection
- Street
- Streetcorner – Location adjacent to an intersection of two roads
