= Channelization (roads) =

Concept in traffic engineering

An intersection with a right turn channel for the Northbound approach and a reciprocal left turn bay for the Westbound approach

Channelization is a traffic engineering concept that employs the use of secondary roads or slip lanes to separate certain flows of traffic from the main traffic lanes. The method came into favor in the United States in the 1950s. One of the most effective and efficient methods of controlling the traffic on a highway is the adoption of high intersection geometric design standards.

Channelization is an integral part of at-grade intersections to separate turning movements from through movements that are considered advisable. That helps greatly to reduce the intensity and frequency of loss of life and property from crashes. Proper channelization increases capacity, improves safety, provides maximum convenience, and instils driver confidence. Improper channelization has the opposite effects and may be worse than none at all.

Over-channelization should be avoided because it could create confusion and worsen operations. Channelization of at-grade intersections is the separation or regulation of conflicting traffic movements into definite paths of travel by the use of pavement markings, raised islands, or other suitable means to facilitate the safe and orderly movement of both vehicles and pedestrians.

== Turn island ==
A turn island may be created where turns are channelized to reduce stop line distance, reduce pedestrian crossing length, and facilitate traffic movement in the turning direction.

== Sources ==
- Channelization-The Design of Highway Intersections at Grade. Transportation Research Board, 1952 (TRB Special Report #5).
- Channelization-The Design of Highway Intersections at Grade. Transportation Research Board, 1962 (TRB Special Report #74).
- Neuman, Timothy R. (June 1985). Intersection Channelization Design Guide. Transportation Research Board (National Cooperative Highway Research Program Report NR279). ISBN 0-309-03864-2.
