= Bike box =

Bike box may refer to either a:

- Advanced stop line, a road marking facility at intersections to allow cyclists to advance ahead of other traffic
- Bicycle locker, an individual storage facility for bicycles
- Bicycle mechanic, mobile bicycle repair tool kit
