= Texas tea =

Texas tea or Texas TEA may refer to:

- Petroleum, crude oil drilled from the Earth
  - Oil in Texas
- A variation of Long Island iced tea with whiskey added
- "Texas Tea", a song by Post Malone from Austin
- Purple Drank, a drug composed of Sprite and prescription cough syrup
- A live-action episode of The Super Mario Bros. Super Show!
- The Texas Education Agency (TEA)

== See also ==
- Texas T
