= Bowtie (road) =

Type of road intersection

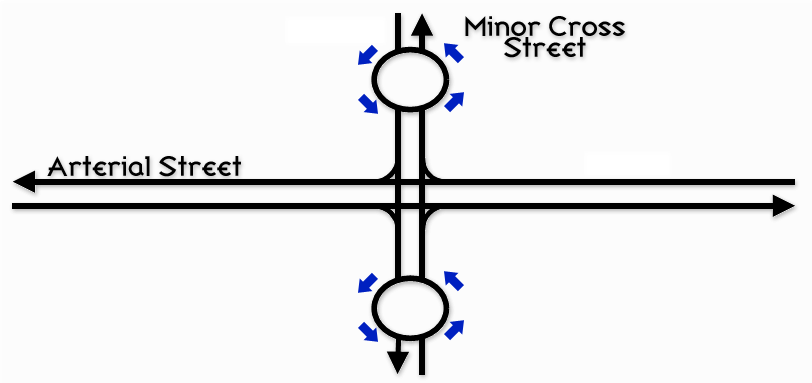
A bowtie road junction, where traffic drives on the right

The bowtie is a type of road intersection which replaces left turns (in jurisdictions that drive on the right) or right turns (in jurisdictions that drive on the left), with roundabouts on the cross street. It is an alternative to the Michigan left intersection.

== Design ==
Left turns are prohibited at the main intersection, which therefore requires only a two-phase signal. Vehicles yield upon entry to the roundabout. If the roundabout has only two entrances, the entry from the main intersection does not have to yield.

A bowtie can be adapted from an existing generic intersection that has two nearby roundabouts, so long as the roundabouts are on opposing sides of the intersection.

The roundabout diameter, including the center island and circulating roadway, varies from 90 to 300 feet (27–91 m) depending on the speed of traffic on the approaches, the volume of traffic served, the number of approaches, and the design vehicle.

This configuration would reduce delay for the arterial street, increase capacity, and reduce the number of stops required. The primary problem with such a configuration is driver disregard for the left turn prohibition at the main intersection.

As of 2007 no agency has designed a complete bowtie road junction.

== See also ==
- Hamburger roundabout/throughabout/cut-through roundabout
