= Superstreet =

Type of high capacity intersection

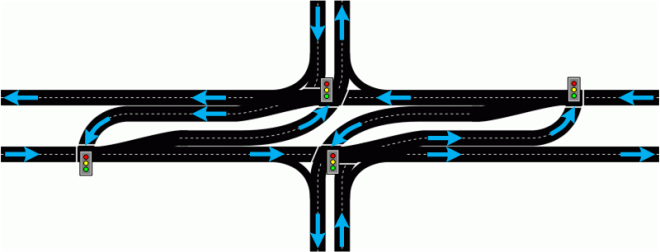
At a superstreet, crossroad traffic intersecting with a main thoroughfare is restricted from any direct crossing or left turns. Traffic may only turn right, merging onto the main road, which then provides U-turn lane access and allows for left (or right) turns onto the intersecting crossroad. The opposite applies for countries that drive on the left.

A superstreet (Note: Also known as a restricted crossing U-turn (RCUT), J-turn, or reduced conflict intersection (RCI).) is a type of road intersection that is a variation of the Michigan left. In this configuration, in contrast to the Michigan left, traffic on the minor road is not permitted to proceed straight across the major road or highway. Drivers on the minor road wishing to turn left or go straight must turn right onto the major road, then, a short distance away, queue (wait) into a designated U-turn (or crossover) lane in the median. When traffic clears, they complete the U-turn and then either go straight or make a right turn when they intersect the other half of the minor road.

The superstreet typically requires four traffic light-controlled intersections, and most traffic must pass through two of them, but each light has only two phases, greatly increasing average traffic flow; there is no need for numerous left-turn phases where most traffic is waiting for only a few cars to clear the intersection. Turning movements on roads with lower cross-traffic volumes may be controlled with stop or yield signs for turning traffic rather than with signals.

== Variations ==
A (standard) Restricted Crossing U Turn, abbreviated as RCUT, in contrast to a Michigan left, typically allows left turns from the major road to minor roads. A variation, designated by the US Federal Highway Administration (FHWA) as a basic RCUT, prohibits such turns, restricting movements to right-in/right-outs and median U-turns only.) When the median is relatively narrow, a "bulb-out" or "loon" protrudes from the roadway, opposite from the median crossover, to accommodate a U-turn by a long vehicle, such as a tractor trailer.

== Practicality ==
Superstreets are not very common because they require substantial right-of-way to provide a median that can accommodate truck traffic. Inconvenience to traffic on the minor road is mostly a perception issue and does not represent additional delay in most cases. However, superstreets are cheaper to construct than controlled-access highways and improve the flow of traffic on the major road.

== Examples ==
In Port St. Lucie, Florida, the first superstreet in Florida was opened in late 2019 at the intersection of Crosstown Parkway and Floresta Drive.

In May 2015, a superstreet was constructed on US 41 at SR 114 on the border between Morocco and Beaver Township in Newton County, Indiana. The state of Indiana makes a distinction between an RCUT, which it defines as having a traffic light-controlled main intersection, and a J-turn or RCI, which it defines as having the main intersection controlled by stop or yield signs. Two examples of what Indiana calls a "J-turn" opened on June 30, 2016 at the intersections of US 231 with IN 62 and IN 68 near Dale. Traffic on the state roads at both intersections can only turn right, while US 231 traffic can turn left at both intersections.

Troy, Michigan has a superstreet on West Big Beaver Road at Lakeview Drive (42.561383°N 83.181310°W). A simpler implementation is seen in Washington Township, Macomb County, Michigan at M-53 and 30 Mile Road (42.7726°N 83.0091°W).

Cadiz, Kentucky has a superstreet at the intersection of US 68 and Highway 139 ( 36°50'37.97"N, 87°49'30.61"W).

Lake Elmo, Minnesota has a superstreet intersection on MN 36 at Keats Avenue (45.0356°N 92.9038°W).

In North Carolina, five superstreet intersections were included as a part of U.S. Route 17's recent upgrades near Wilmington, North Carolina (34.21603°N 78.018969°W). There are also five superstreet intersections in Holly Springs along the NC 55 bypass. US221 in Rutherford county from the South Carolina stateline north to the US74 interchange is of superstreet construction

In 2011, Ohio State Route 4 Bypass in Butler County, Ohio, was reconfigured with three superstreet intersections. The Ohio Department of Transportation (ODOT) is also planning to build a superstreet on US 127 at Kruckeberg Road in Greenville Township, Darke County beginning in summer 2019. ODOT materials make a distinction between the project's standard RCUT design, which ODOT terms a "partial RCUT", and what the FHWA calls a "basic RCUT", which ODOT terms an "RCUT" or a "full RCUT".

In Texas in 2010, several intersections on US 281 were converted to superstreet in the northern San Antonio neighborhood of Stone Oak, north of Loop 1604, to relieve rush hour congestion. This superstreet was removed in 2019 following the start of construction to convert US 281 into a full freeway. In northwest San Antonio in 2011, two intersections on Loop 1604, north of State Highway 151, were converted to superstreet. These intersections, however, were also removed when 1604 was upgraded to freeway status in the area. In Austin, a superstreet was built on February 19, 2013, at the intersection of SH 71 and Farm to Market Road 973 east of Austin-Bergstrom International Airport not far from the eastern boundary of the Austin city limits. This becomes the city of Austin's first superstreet and the second city in Texas to feature this intersection design. This superstreet was removed in 2019 following the construction of the SH 71 Toll Lane. Another superstreet exists in Austin on Loop 360 between the intersections of Loop 1 and US 290 which provides access to Barton Creek Plaza. This superstreet allows southbound traffic on Loop 360 to travel from Loop 1 to US 290 without going through any traffic lights. Three new superstreet intersections are being constructed in College Station along FM 2818 (Harvey Mitchell Parkway) at FM 2347 (George Bush Drive), Luther Street, and Holleman Drive.

== Benefits ==
A study showed a 20 percent overall reduction in travel time compared to similar intersections that use conventional traffic designs; intersections experience an average of 46 percent fewer reported automobile collisions – and 63 percent fewer collisions that result in personal injury.

This design also is promoted as part of the FHWA's Every Day Counts initiative which started in 2011.

== See also ==
- Michigan left
