= Turnaround (road) =

Traffic junction

In the field of road transport, a turnaround is a type of junction that allows traffic traveling in one direction on a road to efficiently make a U-turn (to reverse course and travel the opposite direction) typically without backing up or making dangerous maneuvers in the middle of the traffic stream. While many junction types permit U-turns, the term turnaround often applies to road junctions built specifically for this purpose.

== Junction types designed specifically for U-turns ==
The following road junction types are designed specifically to allow U-turns.

- The Texas U-turn allows traffic traveling on one direction of a one-way frontage road, running parallel to a highway, to cross the highway (via a grade separation) and turn onto the other frontage road, traveling in the opposite direction. The term refers to roadworks which are specially built for this purpose; it does not refer to use of an intersecting roadway to navigate between frontage roads.
- The median U-turn crossover (often called a "Michigan left" in the United States) allows traffic traveling in one direction on a divided highway (typically one with traffic lights and at-grade intersections) to perform a U-turn through the median.
- A junction resembling a "backward jughandle" is sometimes found, allowing U-turns. According to the U.S. Federal Highway Administration, this is actually just a variant of a standard median U-turn crossover, built to accommodate roads with medians too narrow to otherwise permit a U-turn to be made safely. Traffic wishing to turn around executes a turn across oncoming traffic (left in countries where traffic drives on the right; right in countries where traffic drives on the left) onto the at-grade ramp (sometimes called a "bulb out" or a "loon"), but rather than merging onto a crossing road, the "bulb out" turns back and merges onto the road the traffic just left, in the opposite direction.
  - Examples of this can be found on a divided section of U.S. Route 101 in Lincoln Beach, Oregon.
- A grade-separated ramp can be used to allow traffic to turn around.
  - An example on a controlled-access highway is the Sabine River Turnaround, exit 1 on westbound Interstate 10 in Calcasieu Parish, Louisiana, United States, just before the Sabine River and the Texas border. U-turn traffic exits normally onto the U-turn ramp, which forms an underpass below the highway; traffic then rejoins the highway at an eastbound entrance ramp.
  - Examples on a controlled-access highway with frontage roads are on the Manuel Gómez Morín Beltway, just north and south of Mariano Otero Avenue in Zapopan, Mexico, just outside Guadalajara. Here, traffic travels to a frontage road, whose inner (left) lane leads to a U-turn ramp which descends and forms an underpass below the beltway; traffic then ascends and joins the inner (left) lane of the opposing frontage road.
  - Other examples on a controlled-access highway are on the Damansara–Puchong (E11) Expressway (also known by its Malaysian acronym, LDP), between exit 1114 (the Puchong Jaya Interchange) and exit 1118 (the Puchong Intan Interchange), in Puchong, Malaysia, near Kuala Lumpur. Traffic drives on the left, and the outer (left) lanes serve as hybrid entrance or exit lanes and frontage roads. In each direction, outer-lane traffic can travel to a U-turn ramp which forms an overpass above the LDP. The U-turn ramps come close to each other, but remain separate; no roadway surface is shared by opposing traffic.
  - An example on an undivided highway is on the Sanibel Causeway, connecting Sanibel Island with the mainland in South Fort Myers, Florida, United States. Traffic traveling toward the mainland can exit onto a U-turn underpass, then return on the causeway to Sanibel Island.
- In some countries, a cul-de-sac allows a smooth turnaround at the end of a dead end street.

== Junction types which permit U-turns ==
The following junction types typically permit U-turns but are not designed specifically for that purpose.

- Normal at-grade intersections on divided highways often allow traffic traveling on the divided highway to perform a U-turn, often when there is a green light for traffic turning onto the side road, crossing the opposing lanes (left turns in countries where traffic drives on the right; right turns in countries where traffic drives on the left).
- Traffic at at-grade intersections with jughandles can usually use the jughandle ramps and side roads to turn back onto the original road in the opposite direction.
- Traffic circles and roundabouts make turning around rather easy, and usually, with the right of way.
- Many freeway interchanges with surface streets are configured so that traffic on the freeway can exit onto the surface street, and re-enter the freeway in the opposite direction.
- The cloverleaf interchange permits turning around by navigating two consecutive "leaves" of the clover pattern.

== Hybrid junctions ==
- On 8 de Julio Avenue, just north of the Manuel Gómez Morín Beltway in Tlaquepaque, Mexico, just outside Guadalajara, there is a U-turn junction formed from two other types of junctions. First, traffic wanting to turn around travels onto what the New Jersey Department of Transportation in the United States defines as a "Type B" jughandle (one used where there is no cross street, allowing a U-turn or a turn onto a side street). Then, U-turning traffic crosses the road and travels along a narrow median variant of a median U-turn crossover, completing the turn. The entire junction resembles a grade-separated turnaround ramp as described above, except this one is at-grade.

== Non-junctions ==
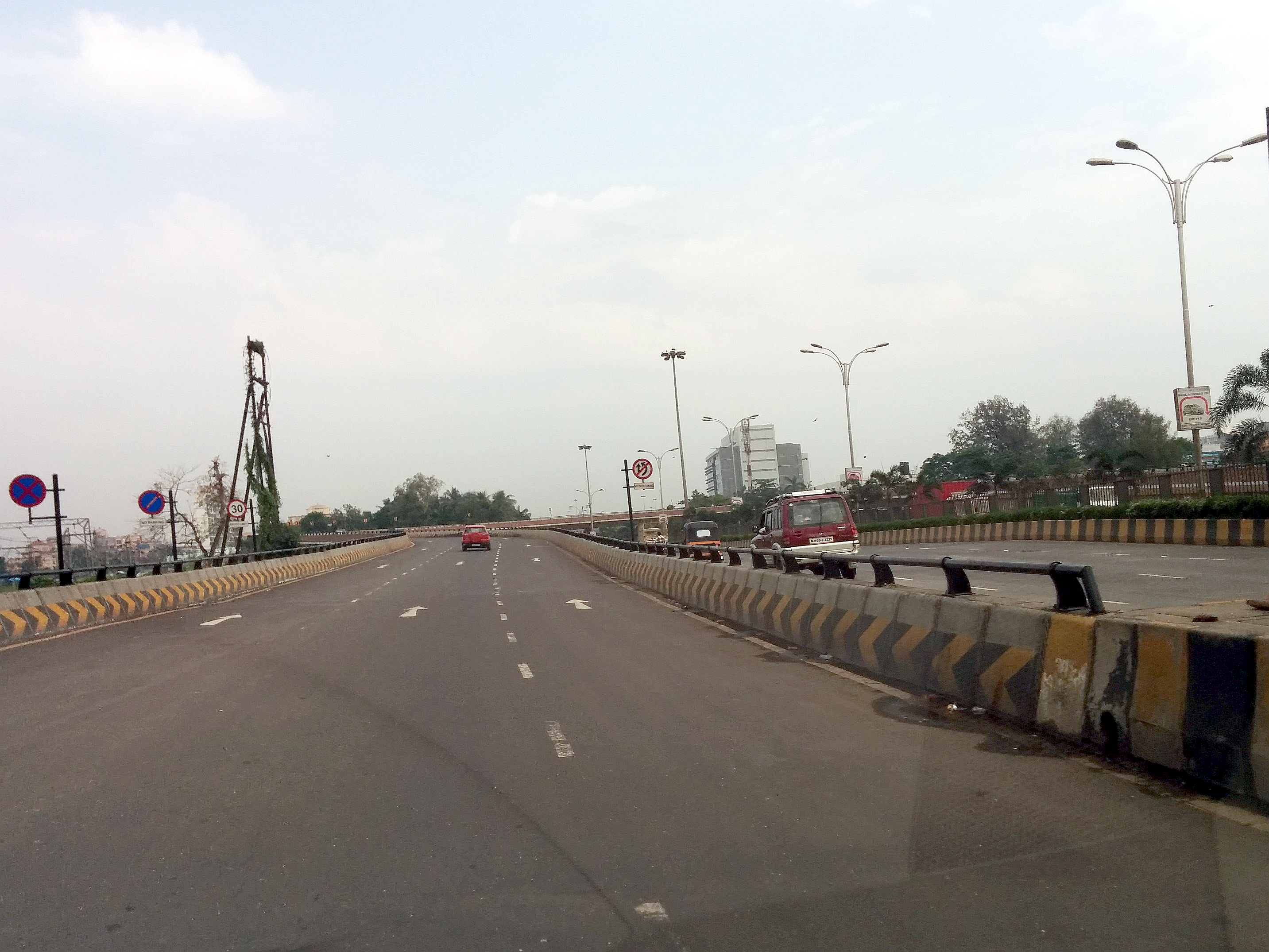
Overpass for a U-turn on Thane–Belapur road in Greater Mumbai

- Some so-called right-in/right-out expressways, left-in/left-out expressways and Jersey freeways have overpass or underpass roads which connect to side roads accessed by right-in/right-out or left-in/left-out turns from the highway. While not strictly junctions, these road configurations serve a turnaround function analogous to freeway interchanges with surface streets, as described above. They can also be used by traffic entering the highway farther back which lacks a turnaround of its own.
  - An example of this is on King's Highway 11, at South Sparrow Lake Road/Goldstein Road in Severn, Ontario, Canada.
