= Turn on red =

Traffic principle

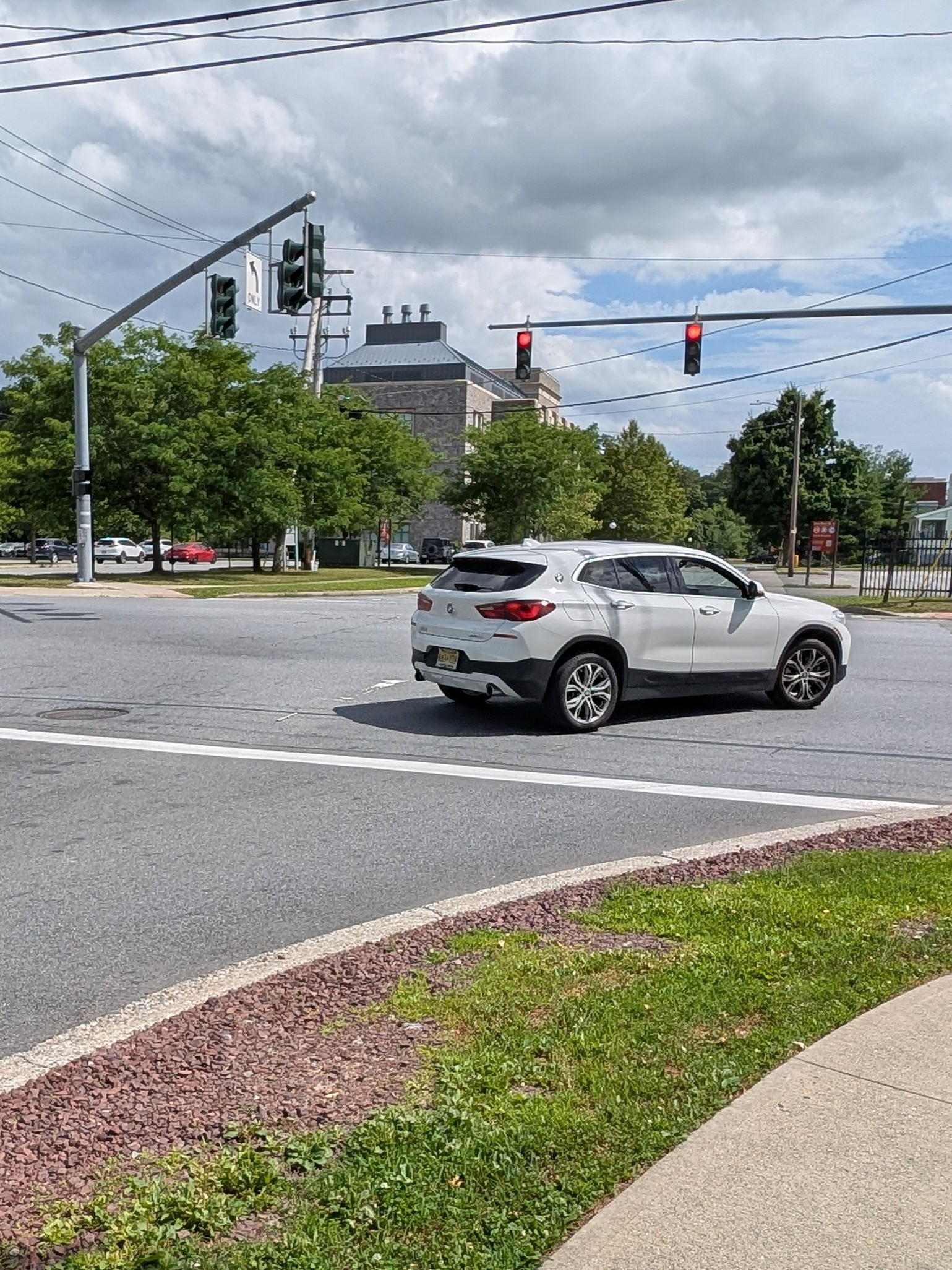
A BMW hatchback makes a right turn on red in New York State.

Turn on red is a principle of law permitting vehicles at a traffic light showing a red signal to turn into the direction of traffic nearer to them (almost always after a complete stop, depending on the jurisdiction) when the way is clear, without having to wait for a green signal.

Canada and the United States are among only a few major countries where turning on red is generally allowed. California was the first state to legalize right-on-red in 1939, with some western states joining throughout the 1950s and 1960s. Right-on-red was legalized nationwide in an attempt to save fuel during the 1973 oil crisis.

As pedestrian fatalities increased nationwide after 2020, some American localities proposed or implemented bans on turning on red.

== Turns ==
=== Right on red ===
The simplest version is commonly known as a right turn on red (or simply right on red) in countries that drive on the right side of the road, or a left turn on red in countries that drive on the left side of the road.

A right turn requires checking only two nearby crosswalks (at least one of which will show "don't walk") and vehicular traffic moving towards the driver, while a left turn or going straight requires checking two crosswalks and vehicular traffic moving in multiple directions.

When turning right on red, the vehicle typically has to yield to traffic coming from the left, and the crosswalk parallel to that stream if there is one. If turning right at a three-way junction from a major road onto a minor road, the vehicle has to yield to the crosswalk as well as oncoming traffic which may have a protected turn arrow to turn onto the minor road.

Many jurisdictions that allow right turns on red will allow it to be done in any lane, including the outer lane of a dual or triple right turn.

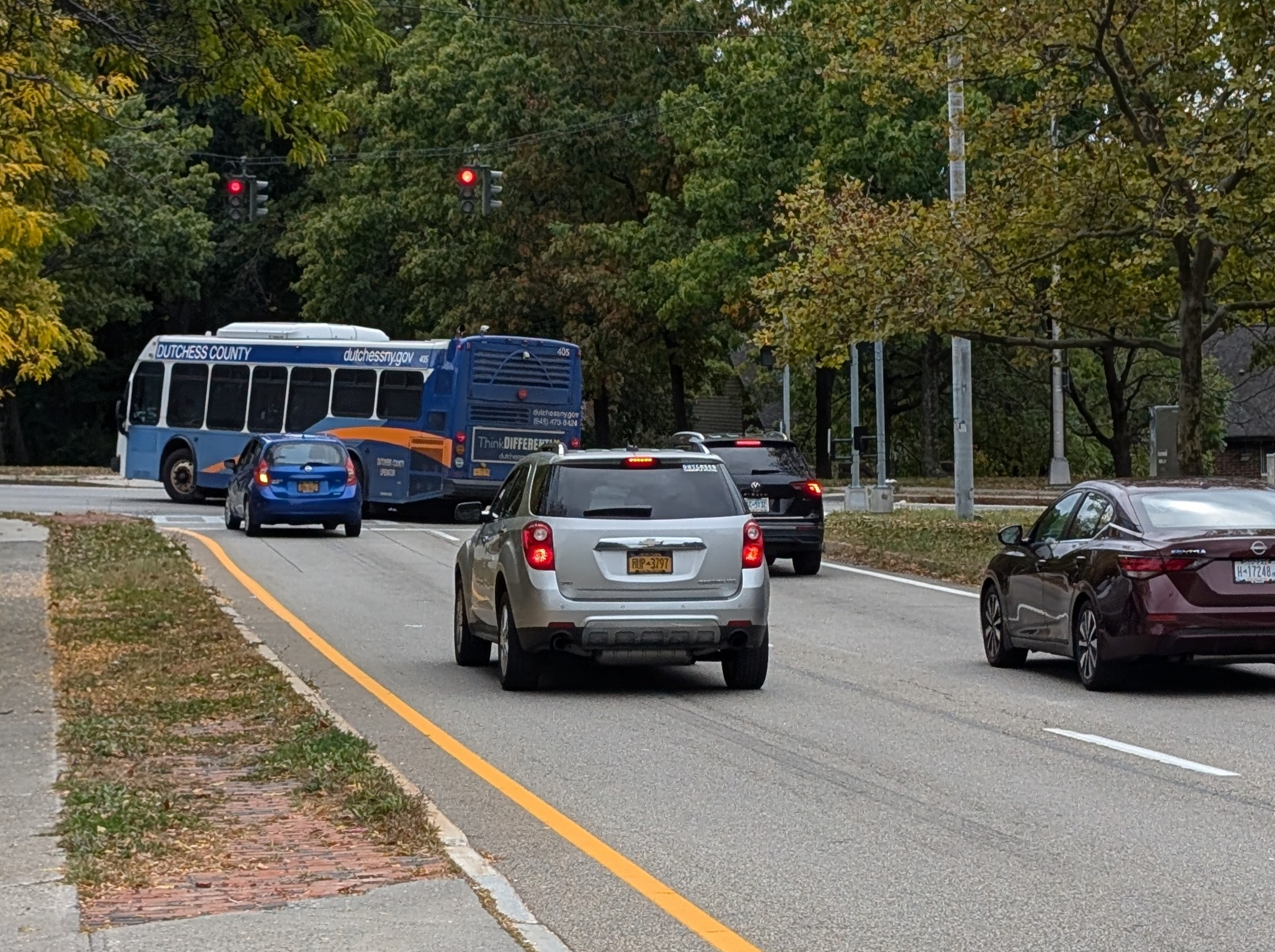
Traffic turns left on red between one-way roads in Poughkeepsie, NY

In some intersections, allowing a right on red would be unsafe, such as when there is a train running parallel to the road on the right side, synchronized to the traffic light timings. In places where right on red is allowed by default, a sign would be placed to disallow it.

=== Left on red ===
Some US and Canadian jurisdictions that allow right-on-red also allow left turns on red, typically between one-way streets. A limited number of locales allow left-on-red from a two-way road onto a one-way road. (Note: British Columbia, Alaska, Idaho, Michigan, Oregon, and Washington)

== Jurisdictions ==
=== North America ===
==== United States ====
Right turns on red are permitted in many regions of North America. In the United States, California was the first state to legalize right-on-red in 1947, with some western states joining throughout the 1950s and 1960s and eastern states amended their traffic laws to allow it in the 1970s as a claimed fuel-saving measure in response to motor fuel shortages in 1973. The Energy Policy and Conservation Act of 1975 required in §362(c)(5) that in order for a state to receive federal assistance in developing mandated conservation programs, they must permit right turns on red lights. All 50 states, Guam, and Puerto Rico have allowed right turns on red since 1980, except where prohibited by a sign. Massachusetts was the final state to legalize RTOR, with the law taking effect on January 1, 1980, but about 90% of the traffic signals in the state were outfitted with "no turn on red" signs in protest of the mandate.

As of 1992, right turn on red is governed federally by 42 U.S.C. § 6322(c) ("Each proposed State energy conservation plan to be eligible for Federal assistance under this part shall include: ...(5) a traffic law or regulation which, to the maximum extent practicable consistent with safety, permits the operator of a motor vehicle to turn such vehicle right at a red stop light after stopping, and to turn such vehicle left from a one-way street onto a one-way street at a red light after stopping.").

The few broad exceptions to RTOR include New York City, where right turns on red have been prohibited since the state legalized RTOR in 1977. The maneuver is scarcely permitted and mostly limited to suburban Staten Island. The state of New York prohibits school buses from turning on red as well. Washington, DC fully banned RTOR, effective January 1, 2025.

Atlanta, Georgia voted to limit RTOR, banning it downtown, midtown, and in the neighborhood of Castleberry Hill. This will be effective in 2026 Similarly, Seattle requires that all intersections be equipped with "no turn on red" signs by default when they are updated or modified, though exceptions are permitted with an engineer's justification.

Some states ban right turns on a red arrow, (Note: In Alaska, California, Colorado, Georgia, Idaho, Illinois, Maine, Minnesota, Montana, Nebraska, New York, North Carolina, Rhode Island, Vermont, Virginia, the District of Columbia, and Puerto Rico, a right turn on red is prohibited when a red arrow is displayed.) while others like Florida, Oregon, and Washington, still allow right turns on a red arrow.

At intersections where U-turns are permitted and controlled by a U-turn arrow from the left-most lane, motorists turning right on red onto the same road must yield to those making U-turns before turning, as the motorists making U-turns have the right of way and a traffic collision could easily occur. The exception is Pennsylvania where U-turns are allowed unless otherwise specified following the same rule as right on red, drivers making a U-turn are required to yield to all drivers executing legal maneuvers including turning right on red. At intersections where U-turns are prohibited in the same fashion, a green right turn arrow will sometimes appear for those turning right onto the road, allowing only traffic turning right to proceed without having to stop or yield to other vehicles or pedestrians. Some states such as California have "No U-Turn" signs posted at these intersections because of the green right turn arrow.

===== Left turn on red =====
In the U.S., 38 states allow left turns on red only if both the origin and destination streets are one way as of December 2018.

Five states (Note: Alaska, Idaho, Michigan, Oregon, and Washington) allow left turns on red into a one-way street from either a one-way street or a two-way street.

As of December 2018, ten US states and territories ban left turns on red. (Note: Connecticut, Maine, Missouri, New Hampshire, New Jersey, North Carolina, Rhode Island, South Dakota (unless permitted by local ordinance), the District of Columbia, and Guam.)

Turn on Red in the United States
US sign prohibiting turning on red (left or right)(post-2012)

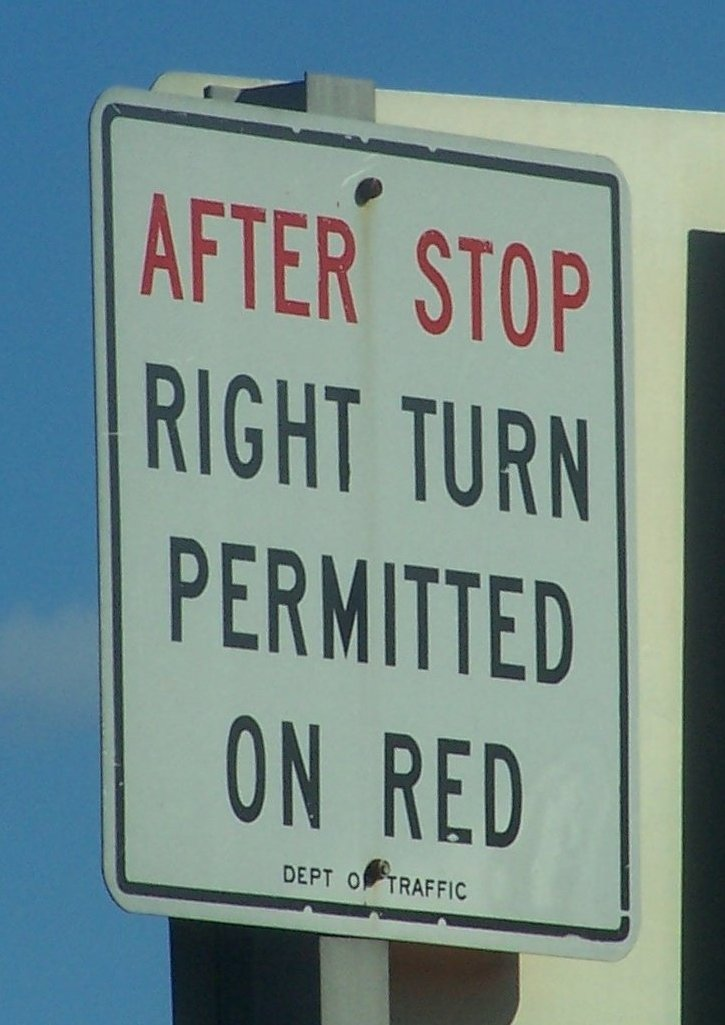
Turning right on red is forbidden in New York City unless this sign is posted

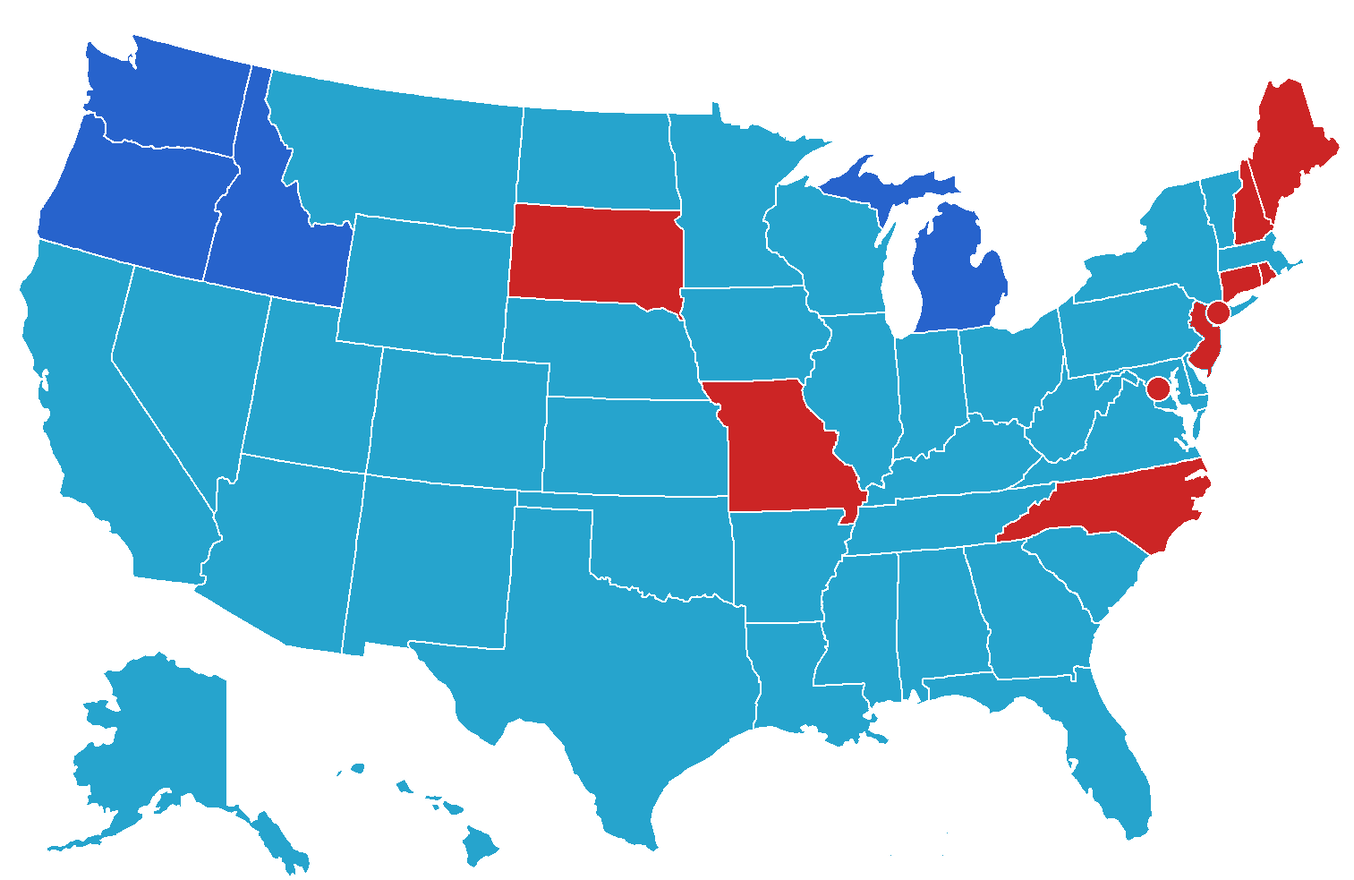
Legality of left-on-red by state. Light blue permits it, dark blue permits LTOR from two-way streets onto a one-way street. Red prohibits the maneuver.

==== Canada ====
In Canada, a driver may turn right at a red light after coming to a complete stop unless a sign indicates otherwise. In the province of Quebec, turning right on a red was illegal until a pilot study carried out in 2003 showed that the right turn on red manoeuvre did not result in significantly more accidents. Subsequent to the study, the Province of Quebec now allows right turns on red except where prohibited by a sign. However, like in New York City, it remains illegal to turn right on a red anywhere on the Island of Montreal. Motorists are reminded of this rule by large signs posted at the entrance to all bridges.

===== Left turn on red =====
In Canada, left turn on red light from a one-way road into a one-way road is permitted except in some areas of Quebec, New Brunswick, and Prince Edward Island. Left turn on red into a one-way road is permitted in British Columbia, even from a two-way road.

Some intersections have signs to indicate that a left turn on red is prohibited. In BC, Alberta, Saskatchewan, Manitoba, and Ontario, the sign for "no left turn" is defined with the line in the red circle flipped compared to other prohibitive signs. Although inconsistent, this allows "no left turn" to be a mirror image of "no right turn". However, in Quebec, the diagonal line is the same as in "no right turn".

Turn on Red in Canada
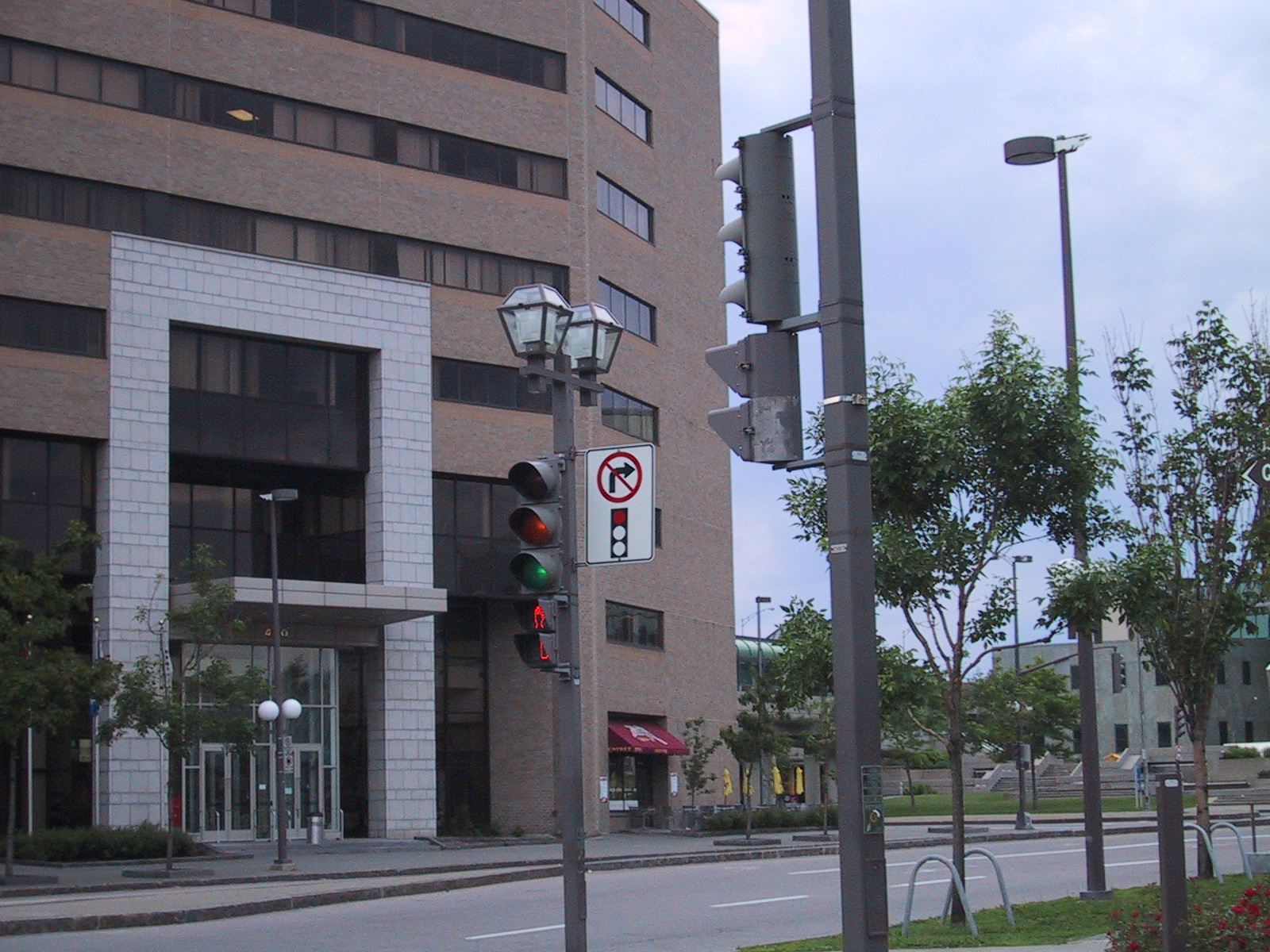
"No right turns on red light" sign in Quebec City, Quebec, Canada

"No turn on red sign" posted at entrances to Montreal

No Right Turn on Red sign in Canada

=== Mexico ===
In Mexico, right turns on red are generally allowed unless a sign indicates otherwise. Mexico City has implemented a new transit law which prohibits right turns on red.

=== Caribbean ===
Most Caribbean countries with right-hand traffic, such as the Dominican Republic, allow right turn on red unless a sign prohibits it.

=== South America ===
Right turn on red permitted sign in Chile

In Chile and Brazil, right turns on red are only allowed when a sign permitting it is shown. In Brazil, effective April 14, 2021. In Colombia right turns on red are allowed but you have to stop at the stop line or 2 meters away from the traffic light if there is no stop line before proceeding with precaution; in all cases pedestrians and bicycles have right of way.

=== Europe ===
Right turn on red permission sign used in Germany

In Germany, right turns on red are only permitted when a sign is present at the traffic light, after a complete stop. This rule was first introduced in 1978 in East Germany. It was derided as the "socialist right turn" in West Germany, which planned to eliminate it after German reunification in 1990. However, a public backlash put an end to the plans, and the practice spread to the rest of Germany in 1994. Half of the 5,000 turn-on-red intersections that existed in 2002 were located in the former West Germany.

In Switzerland, bicycles and small mopeds (Mofas) are allowed to turn right on certain red lights since 2021. One does not have to come to a complete stop, but must yield to crossing pedestrians and traffic. During a pilot experiment preceding this change, wide acceptance and no accident were observed.

In Slovenia, the same sign as in Germany is used, where vehicles can turn right on a red light at all times, but they don't have the right of way. Historically, a different sign with the same meaning was used in the nineteen sixties, a green curved arrow on a small white rectangle board, attached under a traffic light.

In Belgium, road signs that allow cyclists to turn right on a red light have been added to traffic law in 2012. Such roads signs have been placed on intersections in the Brussels Capital Region.

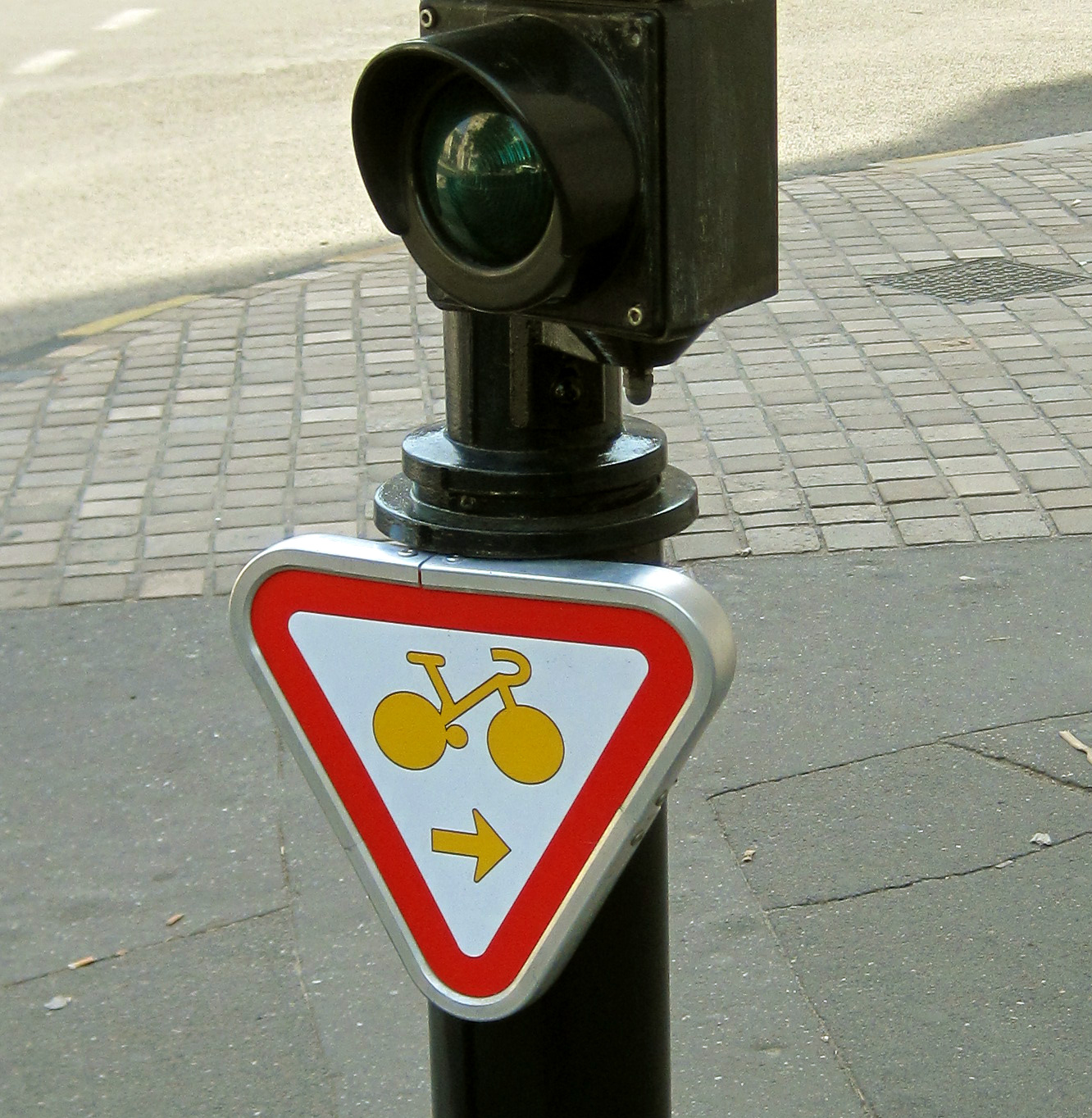
Sign allowing cyclists to turn right on red in France and Belgium

Like in the Netherlands and Belgium, France have a road sign that allows cyclists to turn right on a red light. The French and Belgian signs consist of a yield sign with a yellow bike and arrow inside. Such signs are placed under traffic lights.

In Lithuania, drivers are allowed to turn right on red when a particular sign with a green arrow on a white background is mounted beside the red light of the traffic signal. However, on 10 November 2014, national traffic rules were altered meaning that this sign was valid only until 31 December 2019, at which time all such signs were eliminated. These changes were made for reasons of road safety. The green arrows in Lithuania were eliminated on 1 January 2020. Despite the announcement of the date for the elimination of the green arrows in October 2014, many city administrations were not prepared for alternatives, which led to considerable public outrage in January 2020. The government has allowed the return of the green arrows in response to the situation, but each green arrow must be coordinated with the Transportation Literacy Agency. The agency carries out an assessment of a green arrow with regard to traffic safety and traffic capacity.

=== Asia ===
In China, right turns on red are generally permitted, unless there is a red arrow pointing to the right or otherwise indicated. Proceeding straight on red at T-intersections where the intersecting road went left only used to be legal in Mainland China, with right-hand traffic provided that such movement would not interfere with other traffic, but when the Road Traffic Safety Law of the People's Republic of China took effect on 1 May 2004, such movement was outlawed.

In the Republic of Korea, right turns on red are permitted after stop, unless signed as prohibited.

In Lebanon, according to the new traffic law article number 69, turning right on red is legal unless there's a red arrow or a sign prohibiting it.

In the Philippines, right turns on red are not explicitly allowed nor disallowed by the Land Transportation and Traffic Code as the code does not make any explicit reference to traffic lights. However, in Metro Manila, local traffic codes indirectly allow vehicles to turn right at a red circle traffic light, where only left turns and going straight are prohibited. The Filipino Driver's Manual, a driver's manual published by the Land Transportation Office, advises drivers that at intersections where right turns on red are permitted, they must first come to a complete stop and yield to pedestrians and cross-traffic vehicles. Additionally, the Highway Safety Design Standards Manual of the Department of Public Works and Highways mandates the use of "No Right Turn on Red" signs at signalized intersections where such turns would cause conflict with other vehicles or pedestrians. As such, it is generally accepted that right turns on red are allowed at a red circle traffic signal, except where a "No Right Turn on Red" sign or red arrow traffic signal is present.

In India, which drives on the left, a "free left turn" is generally prohibited. However, some cities specifically permit turning left on a red signal.

In Japan, which drives on the left, left turns on red require either a green left arrow signal along with the red light, or a white road sign with a blue left arrow (not to be confused with the one way sign).

=== Oceania ===
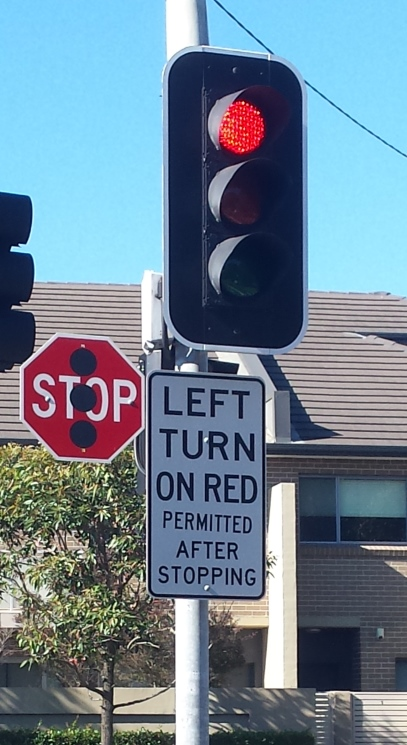
Australian "left turn on red" sign at traffic lights

In Australia, which drives on the left, left turns on red are only permitted if a sign exists at the intersection. At such intersections, the sign generally reads "left turn on red permitted after stopping," meaning a vehicle can make a left turn only after coming to a complete stop first and giving way to approaching traffic and any crossing pedestrians or cyclists. Such signs are only in limited locations in the states of New South Wales, South Australia, Northern Territory and Australian Capital Territory and are strictly banned in other states. In New South Wales, a number of tests to the intersection must be met before a turn on red will be permitted, including pedestrian volume, bus stop locations, geometry of the intersection, and the amount of lane changing at the intersection. Queensland previously allowed left turns on red at certain intersections, but was scrapped in 2021 after a trial period found that the safety risk to pedestrians outweighed any time-saving benefits. There are conflicting views on the policy of left turns on red, with supporters pointing to lower vehicle emission and time savings, while opponents cite safety concerns.

In Samoa, which drives on the left, left turns on red are permitted. Samoa used to drive on the right and basically followed the US rules of American Samoa, and this rule remained after switching to driving on the left on 7 September 2009.

== Table ==
This table shows the legal status of turns on red in various jurisdictions, where no sign is present or traffic signal explicitly prohibits it. If it is normally allowed, a sign or red arrow might prohibit it. If it is normally disallowed, a sign or arrow might allow it, or the intersection may have a separate slip lane controlled by a yield or give way sign. However, a permissive arrow allowing a right turn (or left onto one-way) after yielding to traffic, possibly after a complete stop, is different from a protected arrow that does not require yielding.

Legal Status of Turns on Red at Unmarked Intersections with Traffic Lights by Country
Country	Right (left)	Left (right) from one-way to one-way	Left (right) to one-way	Notes
North America
Canada	Yes, except Island of Montreal	Yes, except some areas	only British Columbia	see #North America
United States	Yes, except New York City, where a sign only permits.	Yes, 38 states	Yes, 5 states	see #North America
Mexico	Yes, except Mexico City	No		
Dominican Republic	Yes	No		except school buses and vehicles carrying hazardous materials
Central America
Costa Rica	Yes	No		
Panama	No			
South America
Argentina	No			
Brazil	only if sign permits	No		signs effective April 14, 2021
Chile	only if sign permits	No		
Colombia	Yes	No		
Paraguay	some towns	No		
Peru	No			
Uruguay	No			
Europe
Austria	only if arrow permits	No		bicycles may turn right on red if an arrow sign permits
Belgium	only if sign permits	No		larger vehicles may not turn right on red, bicycles may turn right on red if a sign permits
Bulgaria	No			
Czech Republic	only if arrow permits	No		
Denmark	only if sign permits	No		
Finland	No			
France	only if arrow permits	No		bicycles may turn right on red if a sign permits
Germany	only if sign permits	No		
Hungary	only if signal permits			
Iceland	only if sign permits	No		
(Republic of Ireland) Ireland	No			
Italy	No			
Lithuania	only if sign permits	No		
Latvia	only if arrow permits			
Netherlands	only if sign permits	No		larger vehicles may not turn right on red, bicycles and mopeds may turn right on red if a sign permits
Poland	only if arrow permits		No	
Romania	only if arrow permits		No	
Russia	only if sign or arrow permits	No		
Slovakia	only if arrow permits	No		
Slovenia	only if sign permits	No		
Serbia	only if arrow permits	No		
Spain	only if arrow permits	No		
Sweden	No			
United Kingdom	No			
Asia
China	Yes	No		
Hong Kong ^{(SAR)}	No			
Macau ^{(SAR)}	No			
South Korea	Yes	No		
India	some cities	No		
Japan	only if sign permits	No		
Lebanon	Yes	No		
Malaysia	only if sign permits	No		signs only in Sarawak and Putrajaya
Philippines	Yes	No		
Saudi Arabia	Yes	No		
Singapore	only if sign permits		No	
Taiwan	only if arrow permits	No		
Thailand	Yes	No		
Africa
Angola	No			
Botswana	No			
Mauritius	only if sign permits	No		
Mozambique	No			
South Africa	No			
Zambia	No			
Zimbabwe	No			
Oceania
Australia	only if sign permits	No		signs only in New South Wales, South Australia, the ACT and the Northern Territory
New Zealand	No			
Samoa	Yes	No		

== Pedestrian and bicyclist safety ==
A 1981 US Department of Transportation study determined that the frequency of motor vehicle collisions with bicyclists and pedestrians when the vehicle was turning right increased significantly after the adoption of "Western RTOR". According to that study "Estimates of the magnitude of the increases ranged from 43% to 107% for pedestrian accidents and 72% to 123% for bicyclist accidents." These RTOR accidents were between 1% and 3% of all pedestrian and bicycle accidents in the locations that were studied.

A 1984 study found that where RTOR was allowed "all right-turning crashes increase by about 23%, pedestrian crashes by about 60%, and bicyclist crashes by about 100%." A 1993 study also concluded that RTOR increased crashes for pedestrians and cyclists, by 44% and 59% respectively.

For the 1982–1992 period, a National Highway Safety Commission report estimated that total fatal crashes in the U.S. involving vehicles making a right turn on red, were between 0 and 84, and probably toward the lower end of the range.

A February 2002 study published in the ITE Journal concluded that "Prohibiting right turn on red would require drivers to turn on green. This would most likely increase the number of collisions by right turning vehicles."

A 2009 study by The New York City Department of Transportation of injuries before and after right turn on red was allowed at specific intersections concluded that the change had not affected accident rates.

== See also ==
- Vienna Convention on Road Signs and Signals
