= Advanced stop line =

Road junction markings giving some vehicles a head start

Belgian sign for advanced stop line for bicycles

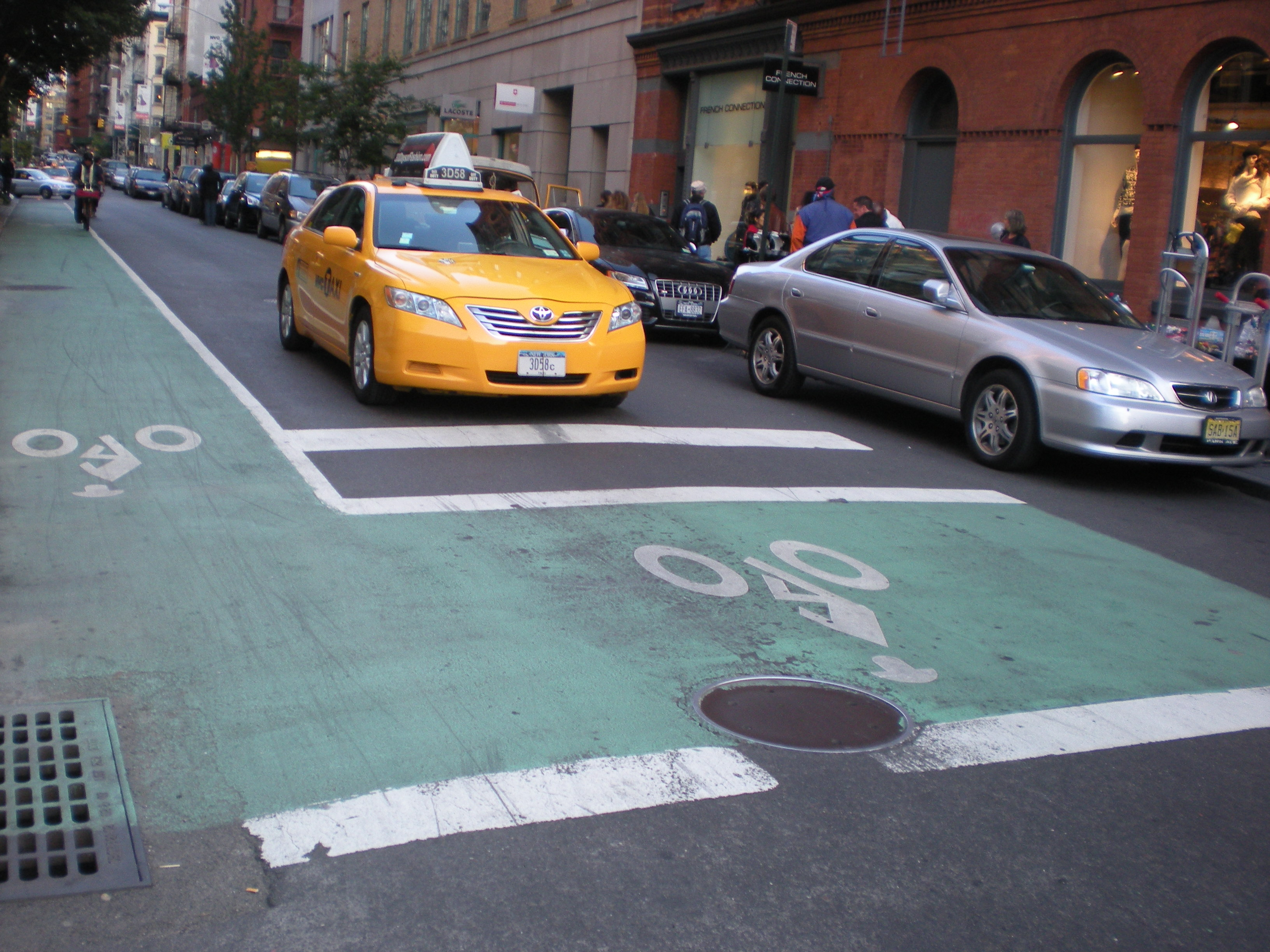
An advanced stop line at an intersection in New York City

An advanced stop line (ASL), also called advanced stop box or bike box, is a type of road marking at signalised road junctions allowing certain types of vehicle a head start when the traffic signal changes from red to green. Advanced stop lines are implemented widely in Denmark, the United Kingdom, and other European countries.

== Description ==
Most commonly associated with bicycles, they may also be provided for buses and motorcycles. There are two parallel stop lines at the intersection, the first one at which all traffic except that for which the facility is provided must stop, and a second one nearer the intersection to which only specified vehicles may proceed. If the signals change to red when a vehicle is crossing the first line, the driver must stop at the second line. The area between the stop lines is the "reservoir" or "box". Signage may be required to inform road users as to the meaning of the extra stop line. A separate set of traffic signals may be provided for the specified traffic, but all vehicles usually use the same signals.

== Cyclists ==
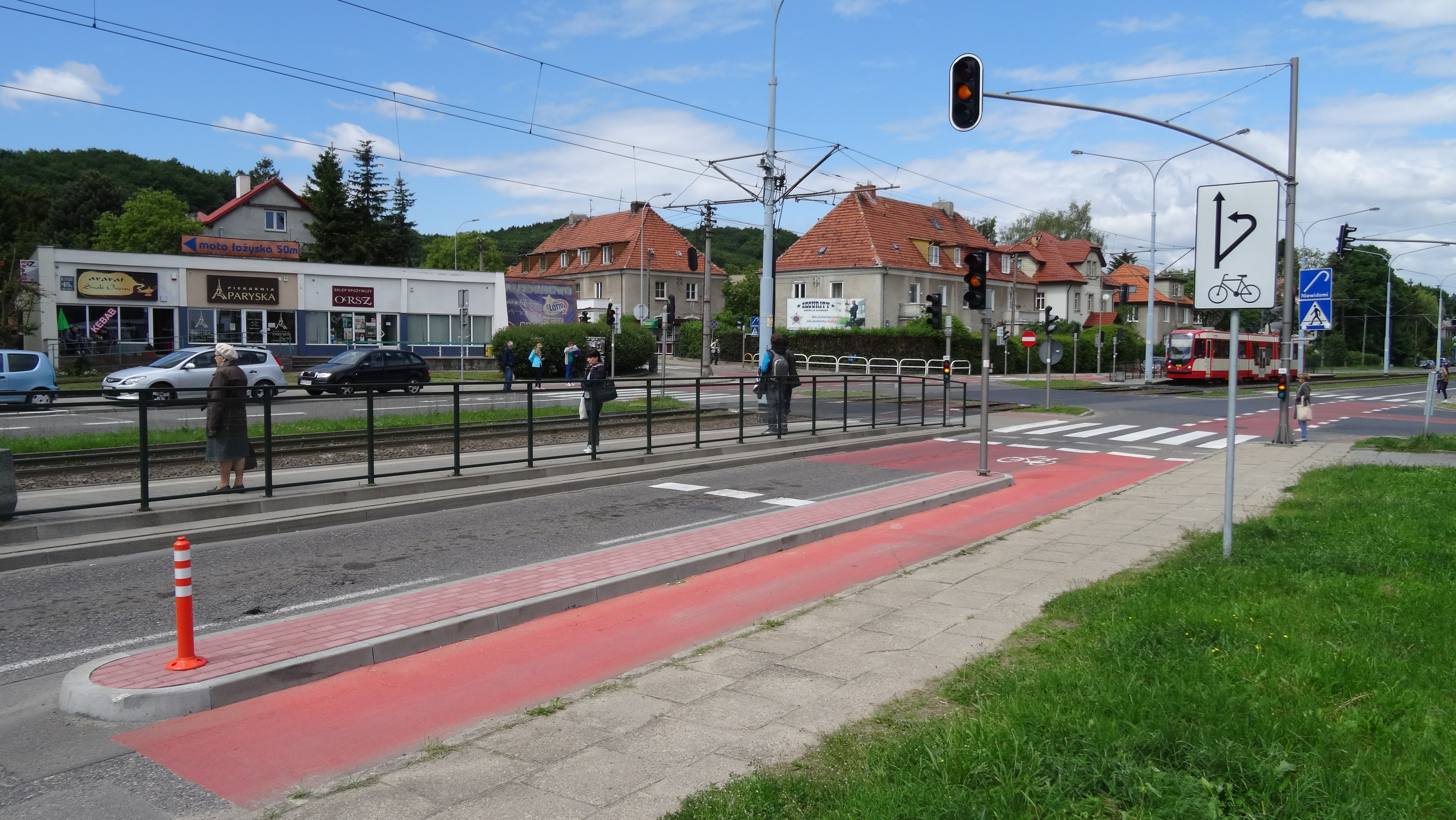
Advanced stop line in Gdańsk nearby the University of Gdańsk campus

ASLs for cyclists are generally used in conjunction with some form of cycle lane for filtering cycle traffic. This arrangement theoretically allows cyclists to play to their strengths by regularising the practice of filtering to the top of queuing traffic during the red phase at traffic lights. Cyclists turning to the offside (i.e., right in the UK and Ireland, left in the USA, etc.) are able to take up a proper turning position. Straight-on cyclists can adopt and maintain a prominent position for transiting the junction safely within the main traffic stream. An ASL will also help reduce the exposure of such cyclists at junctions with nearside (i.e., left in the UK and Ireland, right in the USA, etc.) filter lights by providing a place for cyclists to wait while traffic passes on the inside. A similar consideration arises where a free turn to the nearside is permitted (called right turn on red in the US).

At a red light, cyclists are more visible to motorists by being in front of them. At a green light, the painted bike lane and bike box through the intersection remind motorists and cyclists to watch for each other.

== Safety aspects ==
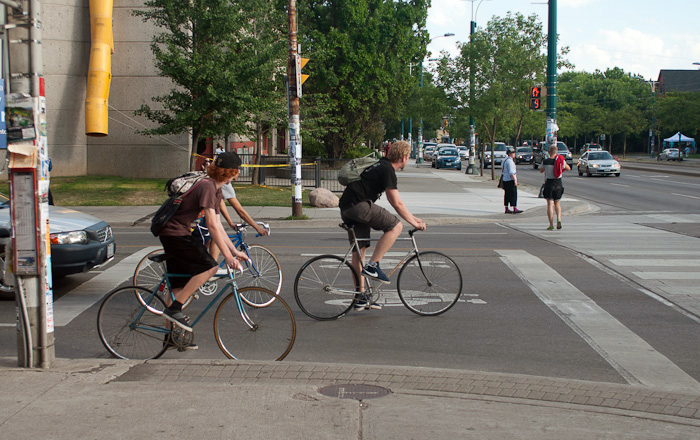
Cyclists in a bike box in Toronto

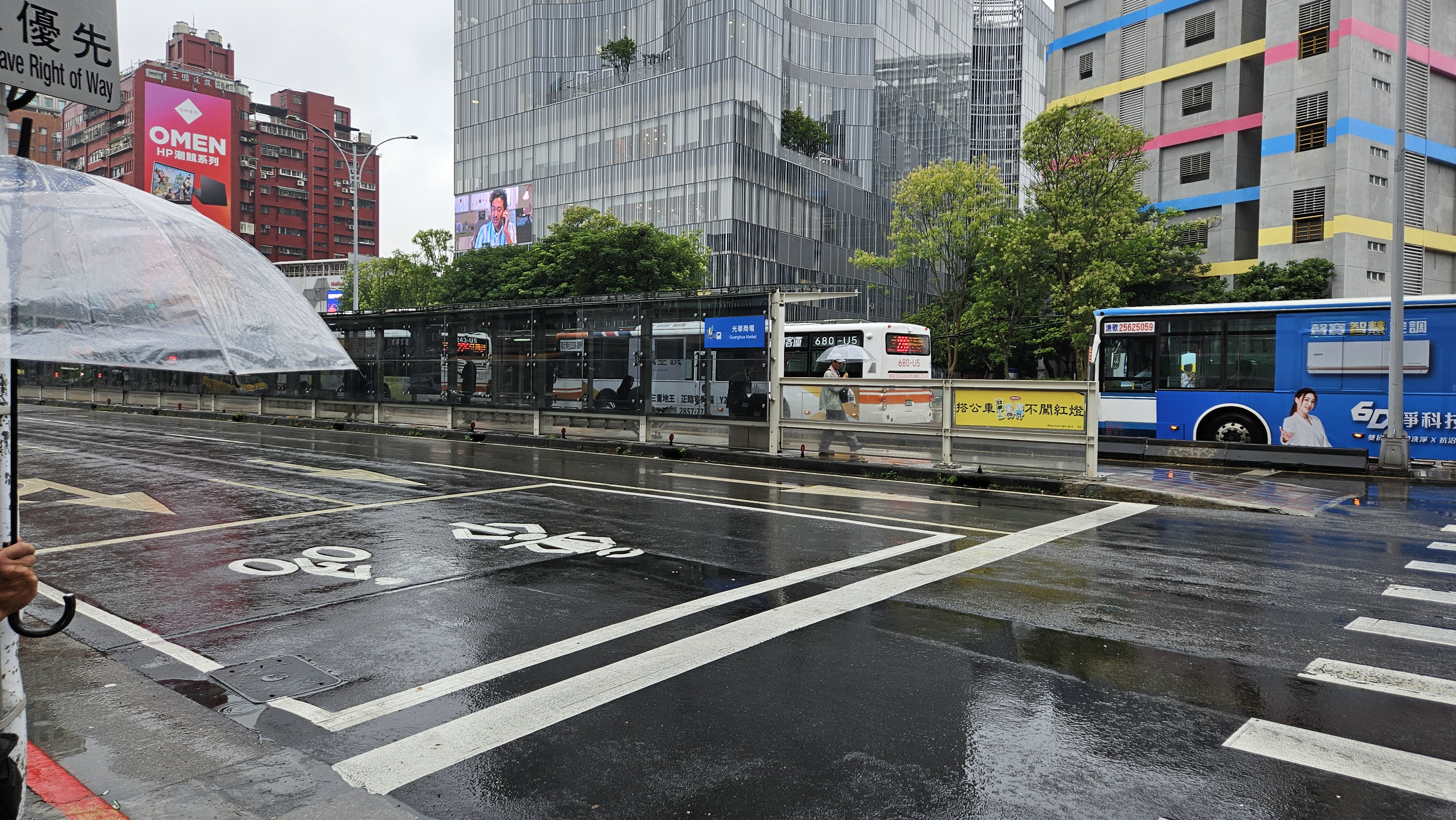
A motorcycle and bicycle advance stop box in Taipei, Taiwan.

Based on Danish research, it is argued that an ASL should have the general stop line 5 m back from the main traffic signal. The reasoning is that this puts cyclists clearly into the view of heavy goods vehicle (HGV) drivers, who are not able to see directly in front of the cab. In America, where the engine is typically under a "hood", the Federal Motor Carrier Safety Administration (FMCSA) estimates this blind spot to be 6 metres (20 ft) long. According to an Organisation for Economic Co-operation and Development (OECD) review, ASLs are also advocated as a way of improving pedestrian safety at crossings by increasing the separation between crossing pedestrians and waiting motor vehicles.

Although waiting cyclists might be safer out in front of HGVs, concerns have been expressed about nearside cycle lanes approaching such intersections may encourage cyclists to "creep up" on the inside of turning HGVs. Collisions with turning HGVs are strongly associated with a high risk of death and serious injury. If the signal is green, cyclists are advised that the best way to minimize danger may be to stay within the main traffic stream. If the lights change while the cyclist is still approaching, the advice is to negotiate their way back into the main traffic stream if possible. Advice produced by the Royal Society for the Prevention of Accidents (RoSPA) regarding cyclists and lorries cautions cyclists that even though a junction has an ASL, it may be better to wait if there is a lorry present.

Portland, Oregon, has implemented these "bike boxes" as they call them, and bicyclists have claimed them useful in aiding safety. The main goal is to prevent collisions between motorists turning right and cyclists going straight. Research performed by the Oregon Transportation Research and Education Consortium showed that motorists and cyclists alike appear to understand and comply with the boxes. Nearly three quarters of motorists stopped behind the bike box, and roughly the same percentage of cyclists stopped at the proper location ahead of the motor vehicle stop bar. In addition, the number of conflicts at the intersections decreased, and drivers yielded more to cyclists after the boxes were installed. User perceptions of safety also improved.

A leaflet produced by the UK Department for Transport notes:

ASLs have been used successfully at sites with motor vehicle flows up to 1000 vehicles per hour, and with two-lane approaches. In Bristol they have been used on the approach to a signalised roundabout. Success will depend on motorists not blocking the cycle lane or encroaching on the reservoir, and on signal timings which ensure that cyclists are not frequently stopped.
