= Michigan left =

Type of intersection

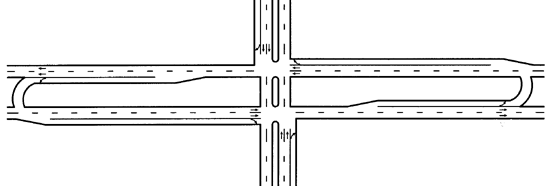
Standard design on a wide median

Stylized depiction of the design in Grand Haven, Michigan, at US 31 and Robbins Road (north to the right), showing the additional area necessary to make a turn on a narrow median 43°2′40.18″N 86°13′12.57″W

A Michigan left or P-turn is an at-grade intersection design that replaces each direct left turn at an intersection between a major divided roadway and a secondary roadway with either a right turn followed by a U-turn or a U-turn followed by a right turn, depending on the direction of travel. It is in use in numerous countries.

== Terminology ==
This intersection design was given the name "Michigan left" due to its frequent use along roads and highways in the U.S. state of Michigan since the late 1960s. In other contexts, the intersection is called a median U‑turn crossover or median U‑turn, or restricted crossing U-turn (RCUT). The design is also sometimes referred to as a boulevard left, a boulevard turnaround, an indirect left turn, a Michigan loon, a J‑turn, P‑turn or a "ThrU Turn" intersection.

== Description ==
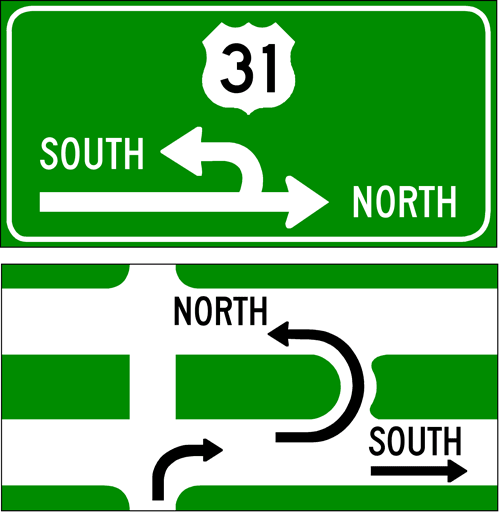
Two versions of signs posted along an intersecting road or street at an intersection. Top: most commonly used; state of Michigan standard. Bottom: lesser-used variant.

The design occurs at intersections where at least one road is a divided highway or boulevard, and left turns onto—and usually from—the divided highway are prohibited. In almost every case, the divided highway is multi-laned in both directions. When on the secondary road, drivers are directed to turn right. Within 1/4 mile (400 m), they queue into a designated U-turn (or cross-over) lane in the median. When traffic clears they complete the U-turn and go back through the intersection. Additionally, the U-turn lane is designed for one-way traffic.

Similarly, traffic on the divided highway cannot turn left at an intersection with a cross street. Instead, drivers are instructed to "overshoot" the intersection, go through the U-turn lane, come back to the intersection from the opposite direction, and turn right.

When vehicles enter the cross-over area, unless markings on the ground indicate two turning lanes in the cross-over, drivers form one lane. A cross-over with two lanes is designed at high-volume cross-overs, or when the right lane turns onto an intersecting street. In this case, the right lane is reserved for vehicles completing the design. Most crossovers must be made large enough for semi-trailer trucks to complete the crossover. This large cross-over area often leads to two vehicles incorrectly lining up at a single cross-over.

A Michigan left generally allows through traffic on the minor crossroads to proceed straight across the major road or highway, especially on the more heavily traveled minor roads.

Its design also is promoted as part of the Federal Highway Administration's Every Day Counts initiative which started in 2011.

== Variations ==
=== Narrow median ===
When the median of a road is too narrow to allow for a standard Michigan left maneuver, a variation can be used that widens the pavement in the opposite direction of travel. This widened pavement is known as a "bulb out" or a "loon" (from the pavement's aerial resemblance to the aquatic bird). Such a design is sometimes referred to as a Michigan loon; in Utah, as a thrU turn, where one passes through the intersection before a U-turn.

=== Grade separation ===
In Guadalajara, Mexico, there is a grade-separated variation of this setup at the intersection of Mariano Otero Avenue and Manuel Gómez Morín Beltway (20.630666°N 103.434981°W). Traffic flowing through Mariano Otero Avenue is routed onto an overpass above the beltway, with two access roads allowing right turns in all four possible directions; the U-turns, meanwhile, are built underneath the beltway and allow the left turn movements from Mariano Otero Avenue to the beltway.

=== Superstreet ===
A variation of the Michigan left that prohibits through traffic on minor roads from crossing the major road or highway, is most commonly called a superstreet or a "restricted crossing U‑turn" (RCUT). In contrast to the standard Michigan left, left turns from the major road or highway to minor roads are usually allowed, although there is a variation that prohibits such turns.

== Examples ==
=== Angola ===
The capital city of Angola, Luanda, makes widespread use of a simplified variant of this type of intersection on its two- and three-lane, median-separated throughways instead of using traffic lights. Larger junctions use this intersection type instead of much more costly grade-separated interchanges.

=== Australia ===
In Australia, where traffic drives on the left, the Victorian state government in 2009 introduced the "P-turn", similar to the Michigan left, at the intersection of Moorooduc Highway and Cranbourne-Frankston Road in the southeastern Melbourne suburb of Frankston. This requires right-turning vehicles to turn left then make a U-turn. As of May 2015, local residents had called for its removal.

On April 16, 2018, a P-turn was introduced at the intersection of Hoddle Street and Johnston Street in Abbotsford, Victoria. Another P-turn was added in 2019 at the intersection of the Punt Road section of and Swan Street in Richmond.

=== Brazil ===
The Michigan left is a commonly used design in Brazil especially in São Paulo and Paraná.

=== Canada ===
In Ottawa, Ontario, a Michigan left exists to proceed from Bank Street to Riverside Drive in both directions.

A Michigan left exists in Windsor, Ontario, on Huron Church Road, just north of the E.C. Row Expressway, where a narrow-median variant put in place years ago is now seldom used due to the realignment of the expressway in conjunction with the construction of the Herb Gray Parkway.

In Saskatoon, Saskatchewan, a Michigan left pairing exists on 8th Street, just west of its interchange with Circle Drive, as well as a few other U-turn lanes as one heads westbound.

In London, Ontario, a Michigan left was constructed in 2025 at Highbury Ave and Oxford St as part of the East London Link Bus Rapid Transit project.

=== Hong Kong ===
This is the design at some busy junctions in Hong Kong where traffic drives on the left. In Hong Kong Island examples include the junction of Fleming Road and Harbour Road in Wan Chai North, and the junction of Hennessey Road and Canal Road Flyover in Wong Nai Chung. In Kowloon this design exists between Cheong Wan Road and Hong Chong Road/Salisbury Road.

=== Philippines ===
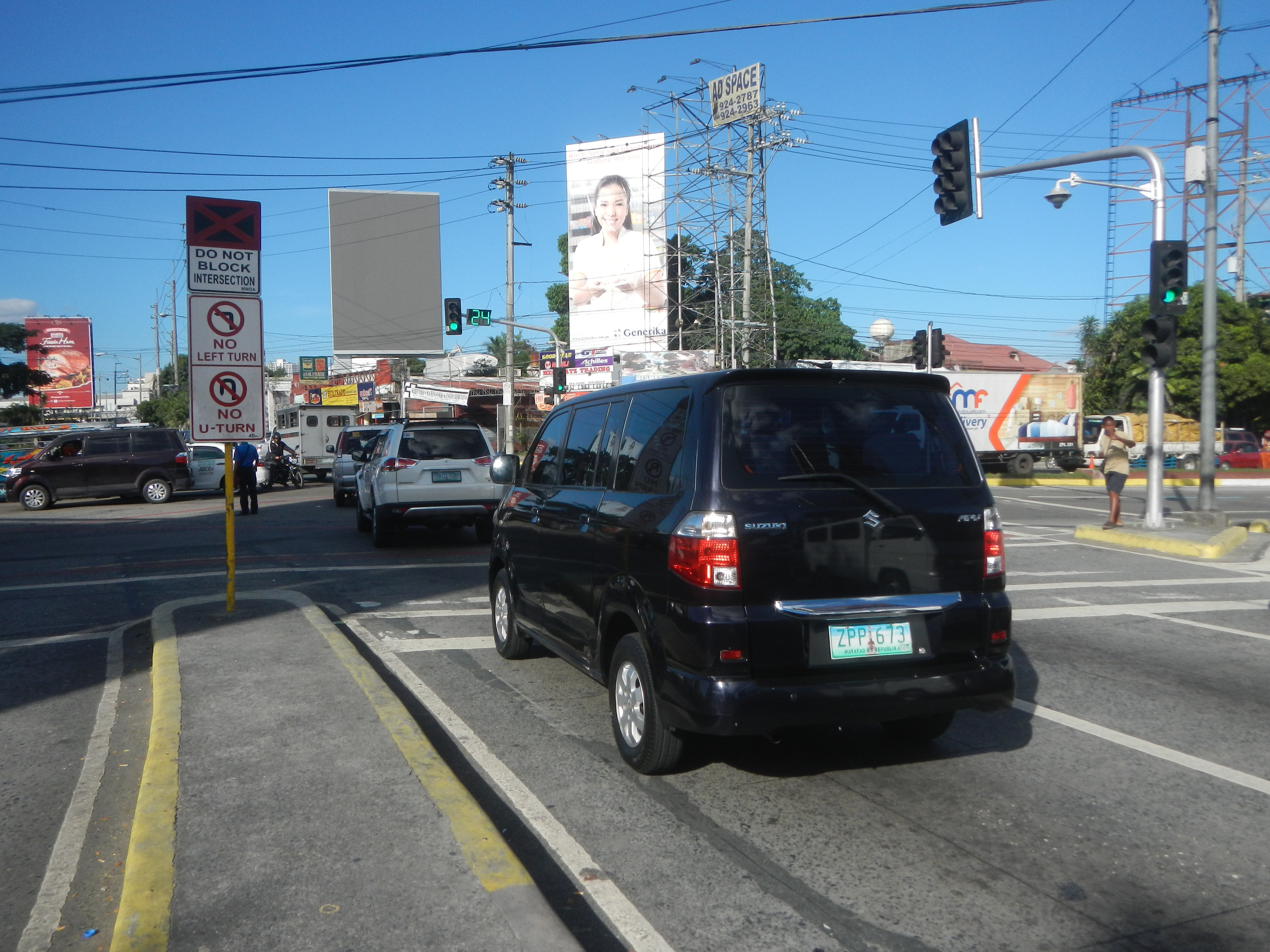
A no left-turn scheme at the intersection of Bonny Serrano Avenue and Katipunan Avenue (part of Circumferential Road 5) in Quezon City, Metro Manila

In the Philippines, the Metropolitan Manila Development Authority (MMDA) under Bayani Fernando implemented a "no left-turn" scheme in the early 2000s along several major roads in Metro Manila, prohibiting motor vehicle traffic from turning left at intersections and instead requiring them to make a U-turn at designated U-turn slots and making a right turn after. The scheme was designed to mimic the Michigan left turn design by creating continuous traffic, mitigating bottlenecks caused by traffic light signals. The MMDA claimed that its "no left-turn" scheme in addition to its No Contact Apprehension Policy and road obstruction clearing campaign has increased the average travel speed along major thoroughfares from 14.5 km/h (9.0 mph) in July 2001 to 17.37 km/h (10.79 mph) in June 2003.

However, the implementation of the "no left-turn" scheme in Metro Manila was controversial, as it was notorious among motorists for causing longer travel distances due to having to navigate to the nearest U-turn slot and for incidents of motorists missing their U-turn slot due to difficulties navigating to it safely. Several academic studies were also made on the "no left-turn" scheme, summarizing that the scheme induces longer travel time and only works with low car inflow and minimal lane changing maneuvers, with the U-turn slots eventually becoming congested themselves. Since then, many of these U-turn slots were closed and left-turning at most intersections was restored, although some still remain along roads such as EDSA, Quezon Avenue, and Circumferential Road 5.

=== Mexico ===
U-turn intersections are very common throughout Mexico, particularly in Mexico City.

=== United Kingdom ===
A similar style P-turn is used in the junction of the A4 Great West Road and A3002 Boston Manor Road in Brentford, England.

=== United States ===
In 2013, Michigan lefts were installed in Alabama for the first time, in several locations along heavily traveled U.S. Route 280 in metro Birmingham.

Tucson, Arizona, began introducing Michigan lefts in 2013, at Ina/Oracle and on Grant Road. Their reception has been mixed.

Indianapolis, Indiana, introduced the Michigan Left in 2013 at the intersection of 96th Street, and Allisonville Road (near the surrounding cities of Fishers, Indiana). The city has announced plans to tear out the Michigan Left due to its unpopularity amongst the locals.

In November 2018, the Ada County Highway District completed work on a ThrU-turn intersection at the State Street/Veterans Memorial Parkway/36th Street intersection in Boise, Idaho.

The design is relatively common in New Orleans, Louisiana, and its suburb Metairie, where city boulevards may be split by streetcar tracks, and suburban thoroughfares are often split by drainage canals. Some intersections using this design are signed similarly to those in Michigan, but with more descriptive text; however, in some cases the only signage is "No Left Turn" and drivers are left to figure it out for themselves.

Since the redevelopment of the intersection between University Boulevard (MD 193) and Colesville Road (US 29) in Silver Spring, Maryland, a Michigan left has been used to increase efficiency of traffic through an otherwise underdeveloped and congested intersection. Due to its proximity to the Capital Beltway, heavy traffic is handled more safely and efficiently.

The Michigan Department of Transportation first used the modern design at the intersection of 8 Mile Road (M-102) and Livernois Avenue (42.4461°N 83.141°W) in Detroit in the early 1960s. The increase in traffic flow and reduction in accidents was so dramatic (a 30–60% decrease) that over 700 similar intersections have been deployed throughout the state since then. Michigan keeps building Michigan lefts where the opportunity presents itself, completing a rebuild of a dangerous stretch of highway (US 131 in Three Rivers in 2021).

North Carolina has been implementing Michigan lefts along US 17 in the southeastern part of the state, outside Wilmington. In 2015, a Michigan left was constructed at the intersection of Poplar Tent Road and Derita Road in the Charlotte suburb of Concord.

Columbus, Ohio introduced a Michigan left at the intersection of SR 161 and Strawberry Farms Boulevard in 2012.

At least two Michigan lefts have existed in Texas. One was located at the intersection of Fondren Road and Bellaire Boulevard in Houston from the 1980s through 2007, when it was replaced with conventional left-turn lanes. Another was built in mid-2010 in Plano at the intersection of Preston Road and Legacy Drive. In January 2014, the city announced plans to revert the turn to a traditional intersection as a result of drivers' confusion. A section of State Highway 71 east of Austin-Bergstrom International Airport at FM 973 in Austin, Texas did have a signalized Michigan U-turn that was constructed in 2014—this was a temporary fix until the SH71 tollway over SH130 (including the re-routing of FM973) was completed in early 2016. There are multiple Michigan left turns currently being used along US 281 north of Loop 1604 in San Antonio. These were adopted as a short-term solution for traffic issues as development expanded north, but will likely be phased out as US 281 is elevated.

In 2024, Virginia instituted a Michigan turn at the intersection of Fredericksburg Rd. and US 29 in Greene County.

The city of Draper, Utah, a suburb of Salt Lake City, announced in 2011 that it would be building Utah's first "ThrU Turn" at the intersection of 12300 South and State Street, just off Interstate 15 through Salt Lake County. Construction began in summer 2011 and was completed in fall 2011. Other similar intersections were implemented in South Jordan and Layton.

== Applicable traffic studies ==
This type of intersection configuration, as with any engineered solution to a traffic problem, carries with it certain advantages and disadvantages and has been subject to several studies.

Studies have shown a major reduction in left-turn collisions and a minor reduction in merging and diverging collisions, due to the shifting of left turns outside the main intersection. In addition, it reduces the number of different traffic light phases, significantly increasing traffic flow. Because separate phases are no longer needed for left turns, this increases green time for through traffic. The effect on turning traffic is mixed. Consequently, the timing of traffic signals along a highway featuring the design is made easier by the elimination of left-turn phases both on that highway and along intersecting roadways contributing to the reduction of travel times and the increased capacity of those roadways.

It has been shown to enhance safety for pedestrians at these intersections, since they only encounter through traffic and vehicles making right turns. The elimination of left turns removes one source of potential vehicle-pedestrian conflict. One minor disadvantage of the Michigan left is the extra distance required for the motorist to drive. Sometimes the distance to the turnaround is as far away as 1/4 mile (400 m) past the intersection. This design leads to each motorist driving an additional 1/2 mile (800 m) to make a left turn. It also results in left-turning vehicles having to stop up to three times in the execution of the turn.

== See also ==
- Jughandle
