= Texas T =

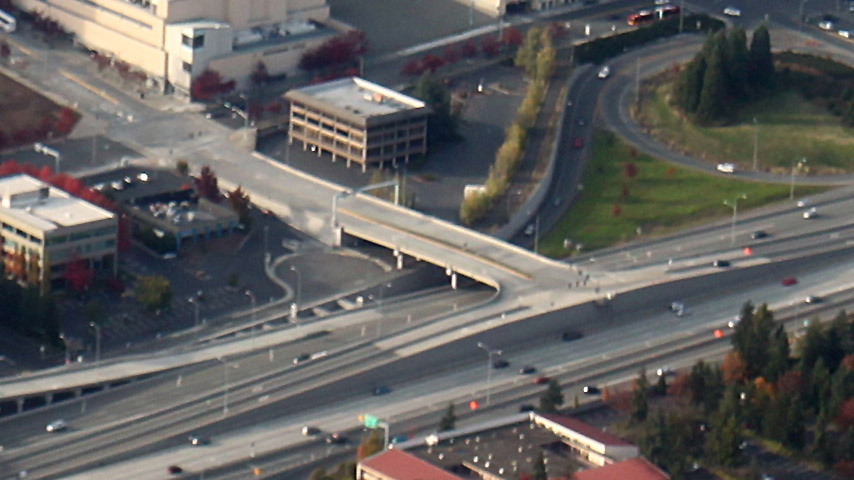
Texas T ramp in Bellevue, Washington, USA, connecting I-405 to the Bellevue Transit Center

A Texas T, also called a T-ramp, is a T-shaped highway ramp that combines entrance and exit ramps into a single structure that allows entrance and exit to the left (inside) lanes of an expressway. It is intended to avoid traffic congestion caused by large numbers of high-occupancy vehicles crossing several lanes near exits.

Most highway HOV lanes are the leftmost (inside) lane, while most exits and entrances connect to the rightmost (outside) lane. Immediately after entering the highway, then, high-occupancy vehicles must change lanes several times to get to the HOV lane, and reverse this process when they near their exit. Worse, many HOVs are large transit vehicles such as vans and buses. This lane-crossing can significantly exacerbate congestion, particularly if traffic is already too congested for drivers to comfortably make these lane changes at speed.

The Texas T avoids much of this lane-changing by providing vehicles in the left HOV lane (i.e., buses and carpools) with an exit directly from the leftmost lane. Similarly, when entering the expressway, vehicles can merge directly into the leftmost lane. The ramp has a T shape because typically the most important destination for traffic is a transit center or business district located to one side of the expressway, and the ramp provides access only to and from this side. The bridge does not completely cross the expressway but terminates in the middle, forming a "T." A "dual T-ramp" design also exists, providing HOV lane access to and from both sides of the expressway.

The Texas T is so-called because of its ubiquity in Houston, but the design is used in other American cities. For example, a number of Texas Ts were built over the last few years in the suburbs of Seattle to provide HOV access to transit centers, and more are under construction or planned.
