= Glossary of road transport terms =

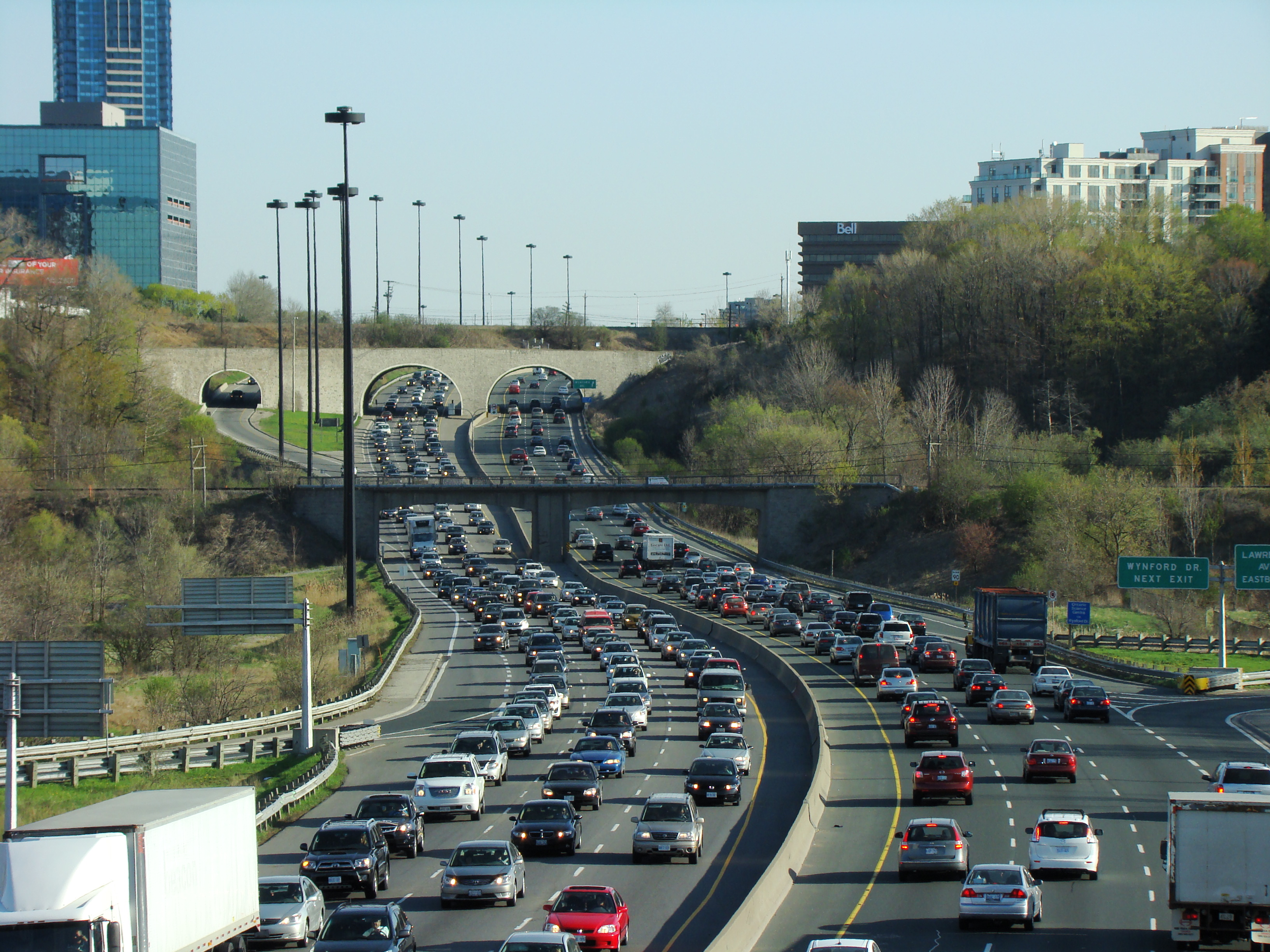
Traffic on the Don Valley Parkway in Toronto

Terminology related to road transport—the transport of passengers or goods on paved (or otherwise improved) routes between places—is diverse, with variation between dialects of English. There may also be regional differences within a single country, and some terms differ based on the side of the road traffic drives on. This glossary is an alphabetical listing of road transport terms.

== 0–9 ==
2+1 road
A specific category of three-lane road, consisting of two lanes in one direction and one lane in the other, alternating every few kilometres, and separated usually with a steel cable barrier.
2-1 road
A specific category of one-lane road being built in Denmark and Sweden, consisting of a single two-way lane with extra wide shoulders for pedestrians and cyclists.
2+2 road
A specific type of dual carriageway being built in Ireland, Sweden, and Finland, consisting of two lanes in each direction separated by a steel cable barrier.
3-way junction or 3-way intersection

5-1-1
A transportation and traffic information telephone hotline in some regions of the United States and Canada that was initially designated for road weather information.

== A ==
Access road

Advisory speed limit
A speed recommendation by a governing body.
All-way stop or four-way stop
An intersection system where traffic approaching it from all directions is required to stop before proceeding through the intersection.
Alternate route or optional route
A highway that splits off the mainline and reconnects some distance later.
Ambulance
A medically equipped vehicle which transports patients to treatment facilities, such as hospitals.
Annual average daily traffic (AADT)
A measure of total volume of vehicle traffic on a segment of road for a year divided by 365 days to produce an average.
Arterial road or arterial thoroughfare
A high-capacity urban road designed to deliver traffic at the highest possible level of service.
At-grade intersection
A junction at which two or more roads cross at the same level or grade.
Automobile

Automotive vehicle

Autonomous vehicle

Auxiliary route
A highway that supplements a major or mainline highway.

== B ==
Backroad
A secondary type of road usually found in rural areas.
Barrier toll system or open toll system
A method of collecting tolls on highways using toll barriers at regularly spaced intervals on the toll road's mainline, usually charging a flat rate at each barrier.
Beltway

Bicycle, bike, or cycle
A human-powered or motor-powered, pedal-driven, single-track vehicle, having two wheels attached to a frame, one behind the other.
Bicycle boulevard
A street that allows local vehicle traffic, but is prioritized for bicycles and other non-motorized travel.
Bike freeway, cycling superhighway, fast cycle route, or bicycle highway
An informal name for a bicycle path that is meant for long-distance traffic.
Bike lane or cycle lane
A lane restricted to bicycles.
Boom barrier or boom gate
A bar or pole pivoted to block vehicular or pedestrian access through a controlled point.
Bottleneck

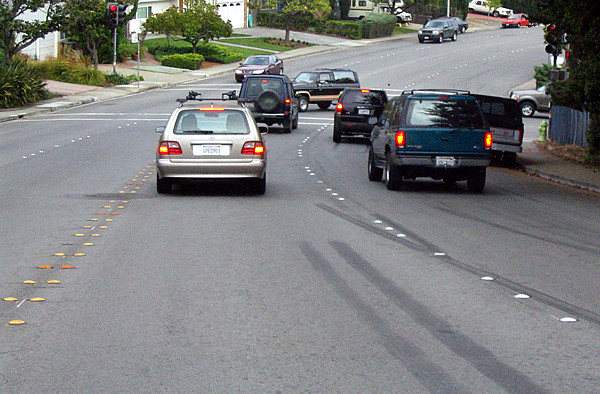
Botts' dots along a road in California

Botts' dots
Round non-reflective raised pavement markers used to mark lanes on roads.
Boulevard
A type of large road, usually running through a city.
Box junction
A road traffic control measure designed to prevent congestion and gridlock at junctions. The surface of the junction is typically marked with a criss-cross grid of diagonal painted lines (or only two lines crossing each other in the box), and vehicles may not enter the area so marked unless their exit from the junction is clear (or, if turning, to await a gap in the oncoming traffic flow).
Broken U-turn

Bus
A road vehicle designed to carry many passengers.
Bus lane
A lane restricted to buses, and sometimes certain other vehicles such as taxis.
Bus rapid transit, BRT, busway, or transitway
A bus-based public transport system designed to improve capacity and reliability relative to a conventional bus system.
Bus station or bus depot
A structure where city or intercity buses stop to pick up and drop off passengers.
Bus stop
A designated place where buses stop for passengers to board or alight from it.
Business route or city route
An auxiliary route that passes through the central business district of a city.
Butterfly junction

Button copy
A past physical design of road signs in the United States in which retroreflective buttons made of transparent plastic are placed in rows following the contours of sign legend elements, usually painted white, such as letters, numbers, arrows, and borders.
Bypass
An auxiliary route that relieves congestion along the mainline by routing traffic around a city or congested area. Can also be used to refer to a segment of road built to reroute the mainline away from a city or congested area.

== C ==
Cab

Cant or camber
The gradient of the road surface at 90° to the direction of travel; the difference in height between the edge and the crown of the road.
Car or automobile
A wheeled motor vehicle used for transportation.
Car crash or car accident

Carriageway or roadway
A width of road on which a vehicle is not restricted by any physical barriers or separation to move laterally. A roadway can comprise one or more carriageways; single carriageways may contain both directions of traffic for the roadway, while multiple carriageways can separate traffic by direction or type.
Cashless tolling

Cat's eye
A retroreflective safety device used in road marking and the first of a range of raised pavement markers.
Central reservation

Circumferential highway

City route

Clean vehicle

Climbing lane
A lane that allows slower travel for large vehicles, such as large trucks or semi-trailer trucks, ascending a steep grade.
Closed toll collection system

Diagram of a cloverleaf interchange

Cloverleaf interchange or cloverleaf junction
A two-level interchange in which turns are handled by eight total ramp or slip roads, four of which form loops that give the interchange the shape of a cloverleaf from the air. Each ramp allows traffic from one direction of a roadway to access only one direction of the crossroad: e.g. from northbound to eastbound while a separate ramp connects from northbound to westbound. Traffic is fully grade separated; it does not need to stop to make any of the connections between the two roadways.
Coastal evacuation route

Collector–distributor lanes

Collector road or distributor road
A low-to-moderate-capacity road which serves to move traffic from local streets to arterial roads.
Commercial vehicle
A motor vehicle used for transporting goods or paying passengers.
Concurrency
An instance of one physical road bearing two or more different highway, motorway, or other route numbers.
Cone

Confirming marker

Congestion

Congestion pricing
A system of surcharging users of roads that are subject to congestion.
Connector or cutoff
An auxiliary route that provides a shortcut between two routes or a connection between two routes that otherwise do no connect.
Constitutional route
A highway defined in the constitution of the place in which it is located. Only found in Minnesota.
Construction area, construction zone, work area, or work zone
A stretch of road on which road construction is taking place.
Continuous-flow intersection, CFI, crossover displaced left-turn, XDL, or DLT
An intersection where vehicles attempting to turn across the opposing direction of traffic (left in right-hand drive jurisdictions; right in left-hand drive jurisdictions) cross before they enter the intersection. No left turn signal in the intersection is then necessary.
Continuous footway

Continuous green T-intersection

Continuous pavement

Contraflow lane reversal
The reversal of direction of traffic in a lane, to facilitate emergency evacuations, roadworks, or events.
Control city
A city or location posted on a series of traffic signs along a particular stretch of road indicating destinations on that route.
Controlled-access highway, motorway, or freeway
A type of highway which has been designed for high-speed vehicular traffic, with all traffic flow and ingress/egress regulated.
Copenhagen crossing

The corduroy

Country lane
A narrow road in the countryside.
County highway, county road, or county route
A road in the United States and in the Canadian province of Ontario that is designated and/or maintained by the county highway department.
Couplet

Crossbuck
A traffic sign used to indicate a level railway crossing.
Crossing guard, lollipop man/lady, crosswalk attendant or school road patrol
A person who temporarily stops vehicular traffic to allow pedestrians to cross the road.
Crossroad

Crosswalk

Cul-de-sac, dead end, closed, no through road, no exit, court, or no outlet
A street with only one inlet/outlet.
Curb or kerb
Raised pavement situated along the edge of a roadway.
Cycle lane

Cycling superhighway

Cyclist
A bicycle rider.

== D ==
Dead end

Decommissioned highway
A former highway which was removed from the highway system is said to be decommissioned. The term also applies to a designation which was removed from a highway system, such as when the U.S. Route 66 was removed from the United States Numbered Highway System in 1985. The physical roadbed typically remains usable, and it may then receive a different designation as another classification of road.
Demountable copy
Road signage that is built by attaching mass-produced sheet-metal characters (and graphics, such as route shields and arrows) to the sign face, through means such as screws or rivets.
Detour
A route taking traffic around an area of prohibited or reduced access, such as a construction site.

Diagram of a diamond interchange; left image is for left-side traffic, right image is for right-side traffic.

Diamond interchange
An interchange between a freeway and a minor road where the off-ramp diverges only slightly from the freeway and runs directly across the minor road at an at-grade intersection, becoming an on-ramp that returns to the freeway in similar fashion.
Directional interchange

Distributor road

Diverging diamond interchange, DDI, double crossover diamond interchange, or DCD
A type of diamond interchange in which the two directions of traffic on the non-freeway road cross to the opposite side on both sides of the bridge at the freeway.
DLT

Drawbridge

Driverless car

Driver's license or driving licence
An official document permitting a specific individual to operate a vehicle.
Drivers' working hours
Regulations that govern the activities of commercial truck drivers, most notably limiting the number of hours a person may drive during the day or week.
Driveway or drive
A type of private road for local access to one or a small group of structures, and is owned and maintained by an individual or group.
Driving under the influence or DUI
Operating a vehicle while being impaired by alcohol or other drugs.
Dual carriageway or divided highway
A class of highway with two carriageways for traffic traveling in opposite directions separated by a median strip or central reservation.
Dynamic message sign

== E ==
Electronic toll collection
A system of toll collection where a driver attaches a transponder to his or her vehicle or where a camera recognizes the vehicle registration plates. Tolls are charged automatically to the driver, either by prepaid account or by regular billing, when the vehicle passes through a toll booth or gantry.
Elevated highway
A controlled-access highway that is raised above grade for its entire length.
Emergency vehicle
A vehicle that is designated and authorized to respond to an emergency in a life-threatening situation.
Escape lane or emergency escape ramp

Evacuation route

Exit number
A number assigned to a road junction, usually an exit from a freeway.
Expressway

== F ==
Farm-to-market road, ranch-to-market road, farm road, or ranch road
A highway that connects rural or agricultural areas to market towns.
Fast cycle route

Fire engine, fire truck, or fire lorry
A road vehicle (usually a truck) that functions as a firefighting apparatus.
Flagger or flagman

Freeway

Frontage road, access road, service road, or parallel road
A local road running parallel to a higher-speed, limited-access road.

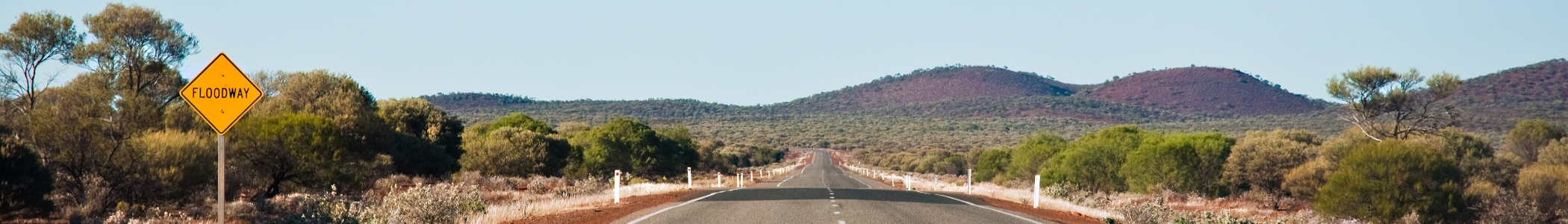
Floodway on Great Northern Highway, Western Australia

Floodway
A flood plain crossing built at or close to the natural ground level, designed to be submerged under water, but withstand such conditions—typically used when flood frequency or time span is minimal, traffic volumes are low, and the cost of a bridge is uneconomic.
Flyover

Footpath or footway

Fore Street

Fork
A type of intersection where a road splits. Often Y-shaped.
Four-way stop

== G ==
Gantry
An overhead support for road signs or electronic toll collection systems.
Ghost island

Gore, gore point, gore zone, or merge nose
A triangular piece of land found where roads merge or split.
Grade separation
The method of aligning a junction of two or more road axes at different heights (grades) so that they will not disrupt the traffic flow on other transit routes when they cross each other.
Green lane
An unmetalled road, usually in a rural area.
Green vehicle, clean vehicle, eco-friendly vehicle, or environmentally friendly vehicle
A road motor vehicle that produces less harmful impacts to the environment than comparable conventional internal combustion engine vehicles running on gasoline or diesel, or one that uses certain alternative fuels.
Gridlock
A form of traffic congestion where "continuous queues of vehicles block an entire network of intersecting streets, bringing traffic in all directions to a complete standstill".
Grid plan, grid street plan, or gridiron plan
A type of city plan in which streets run at right angles to each other, forming a grid.
Growlers

== H ==
Hairpin turn, hairpin bend, hairpin corner, or hairpin curve
A bend in a road with a very acute inner angle that resembles a hairpin/bobby pin, making it necessary for an oncoming vehicle to turn almost 180° to continue on the road.
Haulage
The business of transporting goods by road or rail.
HAWK beacon or pedestrian hybrid beacon
A traffic control device used to stop road traffic and allow pedestrians to cross safely.
High-occupancy vehicle lane or HOV lane
A lane reserved for vehicles carrying two or more passengers or other exempted vehicles.
High-occupancy toll lane or HOT lane
An HOV lane that charges a toll for vehicles that do not meet HOV regulations.
High street

High-T intersection

Route markers

I-90 (United States)

A1 (New South Wales)

Route 4 (Hong Kong)

N1 (South Africa)

Highway
Any public road or other public way on land. It is used for major roads, but also includes other public roads and public tracks.
Highway hypnosis or white line fever
An altered mental state in which a person can drive a car, truck or other automobile great distances, responding to external events in the expected, safe and correct manner with no recollection of having consciously done so.
Highway patrol
A police unit or division charged with enforcing traffic laws on certain highways within a political jurisdiction.
Highway shield or route marker
A graphical representation of a route number, which serves as navigational aid
Holiday route

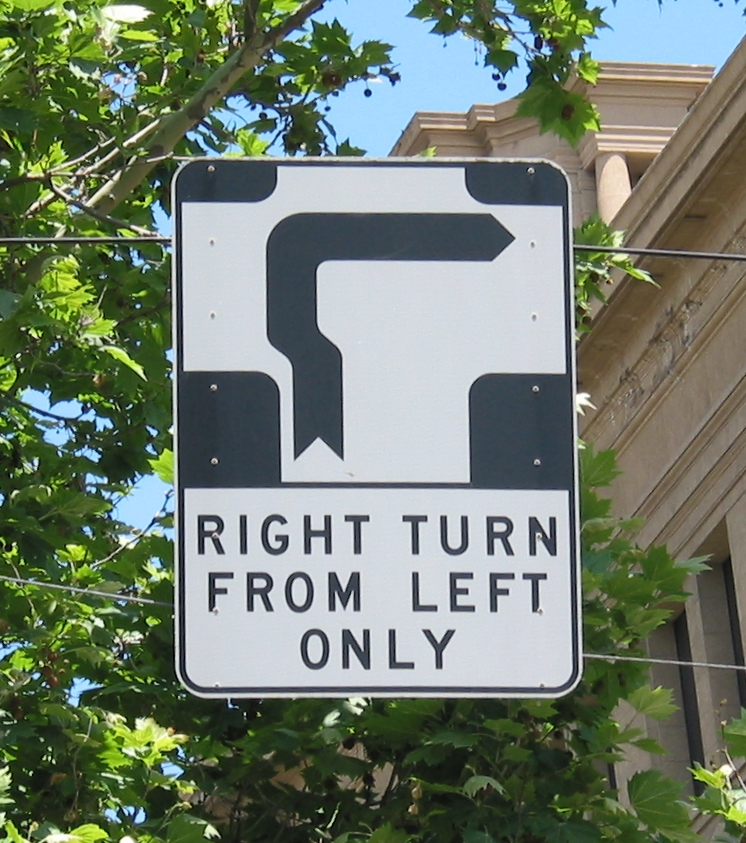
Hook turn sign in Melbourne, Australia

Hook turn
A right turn made from the left lane (countries that drive on the left), or a left turn made from the right lane (countries that drive on the right).
Hurricane evacuation route, coastal evacuation route, or evacuation route
A highway in the United States that is a specified route for hurricane evacuation.

== I ==
Idaho stop
A law that allows cyclists to treat a stop sign as a yield sign, and a red light as a stop sign.

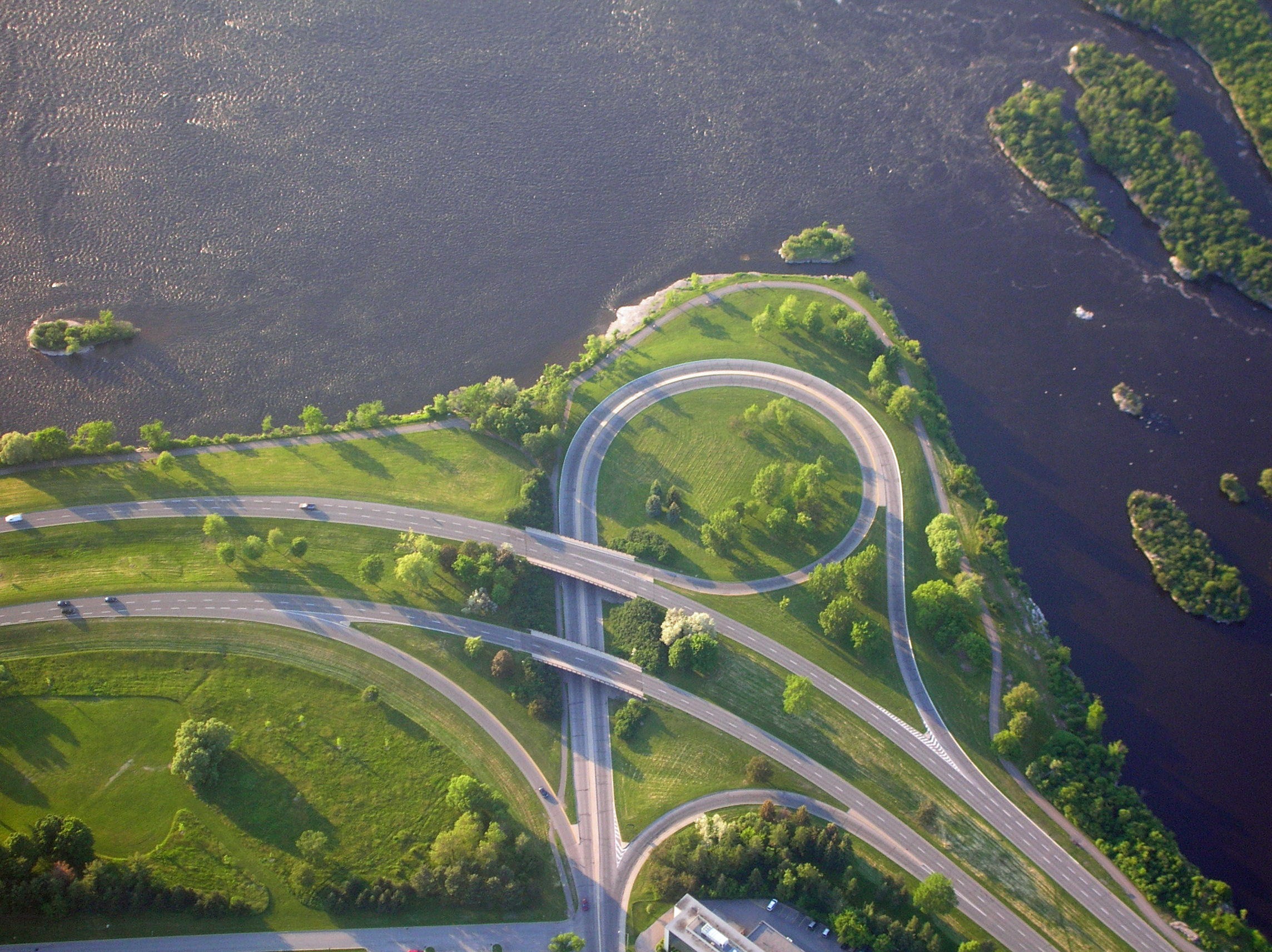
A trumpet interchange in Ottawa

Interchange
A road junction that typically uses grade separation, and one or more ramps, to permit traffic on at least one highway to pass through the junction without directly crossing any other traffic stream.
Intersection
An at-grade road junction of two or more roads either meeting or crossing.

== J ==
Jersey barrier, Jersey wall, K-rail, or Ontario tall wall
A modular concrete or plastic barrier employed to separate lanes of traffic.

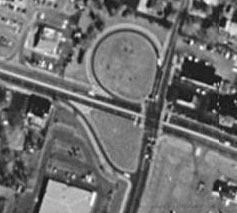
A pair of jughandles in New Jersey

J-turn

Jughandle or Jersey left
A type of ramp or slip road where instead of a standard left turn being made from the left lane, left-turning traffic uses a ramp on the right side of the road (in countries that drive on the right).
Junction
A location where multiple roads intersect, allowing vehicular traffic to change from one road to another.

== K ==
Kerb

K-rail

K-turn

== L ==
Land train

Lane
Part of a carriageway or roadway that is designated for use by a single line of vehicles, to control and guide drivers and reduce traffic conflicts.
Lane splitting
Riding a bicycle or motorcycle between lanes or rows of slow moving or stopped traffic moving in the same direction.
Legislative route
A highway defined by laws passed in a legislature. The numbering of such highways may or may not correspond to the numbers familiar to the posted route number.
Left-in/left-out (LILO)

Level crossing or railroad crossing
An intersection where a railway line crosses a road.
Level of service
A measurement used to describe the quality of traffic on a highway. Levels range from free flowing traffic to constant traffic jams.
License plate

Limited-access road or expressway
A highway or arterial road for high-speed traffic which has many or most characteristics of a controlled-access highway, including limited or no access to adjacent property, some degree of separation of opposing traffic flow, use of grade separated interchanges to some extent, prohibition of some modes of transport such as bicycles or horses and very few or no intersecting cross-streets. The definitions and degrees of isolation from local traffic allowed varies between countries and regions.
Link road
A road that links two conurbations or other major road transport facilities, often added because of increasing road traffic.
Local-express lanes or collector–distributor lanes
An arrangement of roadways within a major highway where long distance traffic can use lanes with fewer interchanges compared to local traffic which use 'local' or 'collector' lanes that have access to all interchanges.
Lollipop man/lady

Loop Around

Lorry

Lorry driver

== M ==
MUTCD signs

Speed limit

Curve

No parking

Yield (Give Way)

Round-about

Mainline
The main carriageway(s) of a particular route, as opposed to entrance/exit ramps or auxiliary routes of that route.
Main street, high street or fore street
A generic phrase used to denote a primary retail street of a village, town or small city in many parts of the world.
Manual on Uniform Traffic Control Devices
A manual published by the Federal Highway Administration in the United States, or similar manuals published by state departments of transportation, that specifies the standards for traffic signs, highway markings, and traffic signals (collectively "traffic control devices"). The manual includes specifications on typefaces, colors, and shapes of signs, as well as placement of these traffic control devices.
Mass transit

Matrix sign

Median strip or central reservation
The reserved area that separates opposing lanes of traffic on divided roadways. The reserved area may simply be paved or grass, but can be adapted to other functions, such as decorative landscaping, trees, a median barrier, or railway or streetcar lines.
Merge
The process of reducing the number of lanes available to traffic, commonly from two lanes to one.
Merge nose

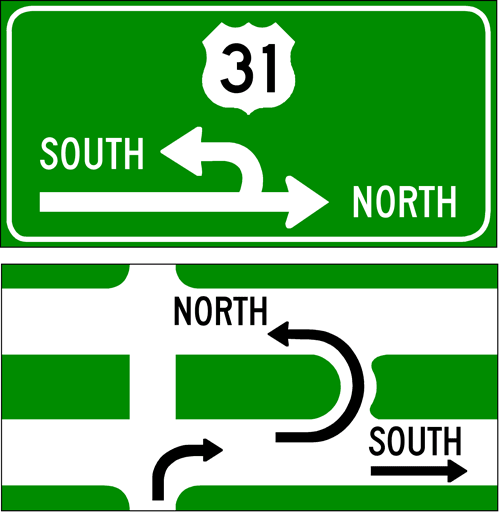
Signage and diagram of a Michigan left

Michigan left
An at-grade intersection design which replaces each left turn with a right turn followed by a U-turn, or a U-turn followed by a right turn
Milestone, mile markers, mileposts or mile post
One of a series of numbered markers placed along a road or boundary at intervals of one mile or occasionally, parts of a mile.
Mobility service provider

Moped
A type of small motorcycle with bicycle pedals, generally having a less stringent licensing requirement than full motorcycles or automobiles.
Motorcycle
A two- or three-wheeled motor vehicle.
Motorized bicycle
A bicycle with an attached motor or engine and transmission used either to power the vehicle unassisted, or to assist with pedalling.
Motor scooter

Motor vehicle, motorized vehicle, or automotive vehicle
A self-propelled vehicle, commonly wheeled, that does not operate on rails.
Motorway

Moveable bridge or drawbridge
A bridge that moves to allow passage for boats or barges.
Move over law
A law which requires motorists to move over and change lanes to give safe clearance to law enforcement officers, firefighters, ambulances, utility workers, and in some cases, tow-truck drivers.
Musical road
A road that produces a musical tune when driven over.

== N ==
National highway
A road numbered consistently throughout a country. Maintenance of the road may be performed at the national level or it may be devolved to states or provinces or to lower levels of administration. The Interstate Highway System, Trans-Canada Highway, and German autobahns are examples of national highways.
No name exit
An interchange that does not list any connecting roads or locations on road signs
No through road, no exit, or no outlet

Number plate

== O ==
One-way pair, one-way couple, or couplet
A pair of parallel, usually one-way streets that carry opposite directions of traffic.
On-street running

Ontario tall wall

Open road tolling
A form of electronic toll collection where tolls are collected at highway speeds without the need for tollbooths.
Open toll system

Optional route

Orbital

Overpass
A bridge, road, railway or similar structure that crosses over another road or railway.
Overtaking or passing
The act of one vehicle going past another slower moving vehicle, travelling in the same direction.
Overtaking lane

== P ==
Painted island

Passing

Passing lane or overtaking lane
The lane closest to the median strip on a multi-lane highway.
Parallel road

Parkway
A broad, landscaped highway thoroughfare, particularly a roadway in a park or connecting to a park from which trucks and other heavy vehicles are often excluded.
Partial cloverleaf interchange, or parclo
An interchange that has loop ramps, as in a cloverleaf, but does not have the full set of eight ramps. These use between four and seven ramps and are not full grade-separated; traffic making certain movements between the intersecting roadways must stop.
Pedestrian crossing or crosswalk
A designated place for pedestrians to cross a road.
Peak hour

Pedestrian hybrid beacon

Pelican crossing
A type of pedestrian crossing with traffic signals for both pedestrians and vehicular traffic.
Pittsburgh left
A colloquial term for the driving practice of the first left-turning vehicle taking precedence over vehicles going straight through an intersection.
Pothole
A depression in a road surface, usually asphalt pavement, where traffic has removed broken pieces of the pavement.
Primitive road
A minor road system that is generally not maintained.
Priority or right of way

The traffic principle that establishes who has the right to go first when the intended courses of vehicles or pedestrians intersect.
Private road
A road owned and maintained by a private individual, organization, or company rather than by a government.
Provincial highway, provincial road, or provincial route

Public transport, public transportation, public transit, mass transit, or transit
A system of transport for passengers by group travel systems available for use by the general public, typically managed on a schedule and operated on established routes.
Pylon

== Q ==
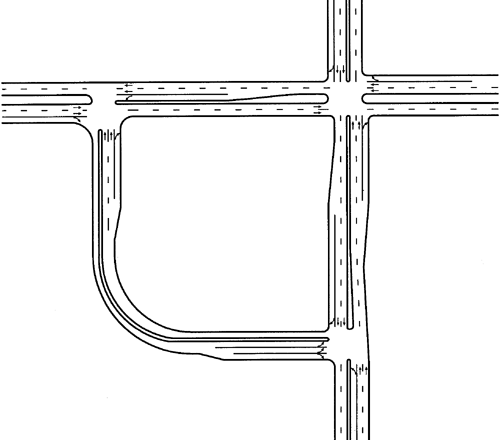
Quadrant intersection

Quadrant roadway intersection or quadrant intersection
An intersection between two roads with an additional "quadrant roadway" between two legs of the intersecting roads. Left turns (in right-hand traffic countries) or right turns (in left-hand traffic countries) are made via the quadrant roadway rather than at the main intersection.

== R ==
Railroad crossing

Raised pavement marker or raised reflective marker
A road surface marker used on roads, usually made with plastic, ceramic, thermoplastic paint or occasionally metal, and come in a variety of shapes and colors.
Ramp

Ramp meter
A device that regulates the flow of traffic entering a freeway.
Ranch-to-market road or ranch road

Reassurance marker or confirming marker
A type of traffic sign that confirms the identity of the route being traveled on.
Red light camera
A type of traffic enforcement camera that captures an image of a vehicle which has entered an intersection in spite of the traffic signal indicating red.
Rest area, travel plaza, rest stop, or service area
A public facility, located next to a large thoroughfare such as a highway, expressway, or freeway at which drivers and passengers can rest, eat, or refuel without exiting on to secondary roads.
Restricted crossing U-turn (RCUT) or reduced conflict intersection

Reversible lane or tidal flow
A lane in which traffic may travel in either direction, depending on certain conditions. Typically, it is meant to improve traffic flow during rush hours, by having overhead traffic lights and lighted street signs notify drivers which lanes are open or closed to driving or turning.
Ridesharing company, transportation network company, or mobility service provider
A company that matches passengers with vehicles, via websites and mobile apps.
Right-in/right-out (RIRO) or left-in/left-out (LILO)
A type of three-way road intersection where turning movements of vehicles are restricted. A RIRO permits only right turns and a LILO permits only left turns. RIRO is typical when vehicles drive on the right, and LILO is usual where vehicles drive on the left.
Right-of-way

A type of easement granted or reserved over the land for transportation purposes, this can be for a highway, public footpath, rail transport, canal, as well as electrical transmission lines, oil and gas pipelines.
Ring road, beltway, circumferential highway, or orbital
A highway or series of highways that encircle a city or town.
Road
A thoroughfare, route, or way on land between two places that has been paved or otherwise improved to allow travel by foot or some form of conveyance, including a motor vehicle, cart, bicycle, or horse.
Road diet, lane reduction, or road rechannelization
A technique in transportation planning whereby the number of travel lanes and/or effective width of the road is reduced in order to achieve systemic improvements.
Roadkill
Animals struck and killed by road vehicles.
Road pricing or road user charges
Direct charges levied for the use of roads, including road tolls, distance or time based fees, congestion charges and charges designed to discourage use of certain classes of vehicle, fuel sources, or more polluting vehicles.
Road rage
Aggressive or angry behavior exhibited by a driver of a road vehicle.
Road sign

Road surface or pavement
Durable surface material laid down on an area intended to sustain vehicular or foot traffic.
Road surface marking
Mechanical (cat's-eye reflectors), non-mechanical (paint), or temporary devices used on a road surface that convey information to motorists, most commonly to delineate traffic lanes or to promote road safety.
Road train or land train
A method of trucking where a tractor pulls two or more trailers.
Roadway

Roundabout, rotary, or traffic circle
A type of circular intersection or junction in which road traffic flows almost continuously in one direction around a central island.
Route marker

Route number, road number, or route identifier
A combination of letters and/or numbers that serve to identify a particular road. Route numbers may be assigned randomly or as part of a regional numbering scheme.
Rumble strips, sleeper lines, rumple strips, audible lines, the corduroy, or growlers
A road surface mark used to alert inattentive drivers of potential danger, by causing a tactile vibration and audible rumbling transmitted through the wheels into the vehicle interior.
Runaway truck ramp, runaway truck lane, escape lane, emergency escape ramp or truck arrester bed
An emergency lane with a sand or gravel-filled bed large enough to accommodate and safely stop large trucks, usually adjacent to a road with a steep down-hill grade.
Rush hour or peak hour
A part of the day during which traffic congestion on roads is at its highest.

== S ==
Scenic route, tourist road, tourist route, tourist drive, holiday route, theme route, or scenic byway
A specially designated road that travels through an area of natural beauty or cultural interest, or along a historic route.
School bus
A vehicle used to transport students to and from school or school-related activities.

Diagram of a seagull intersection

School road patrol

Scooter or motor scooter
A low-speed motorcycle with a step-through frame and a platform for the rider's feet.
Seagull intersection, continuous green T-intersection, turbo-T, or high-T intersection
A type of three-way road intersection, usually used on high traffic volume roads and dual carriageways. In this type of intersection, one direction of traffic travels straight through without stopping while those wishing to turn onto the side road at the intersection simply bear into a separate lane, which forms one "wing" of the seagull. Here, they meet the opposite carriageway and the side road. Traffic wishing to turn out of the side road, simply cross the intersecting carriageway and drive up the other "wing" of the seagull, and merge onto the other carriageway.
Sealed road
A road on which the surface has been permanently sealed by the use of a pavement treatment, such as bitumen.
Self-driving car, autonomous vehicle, or driverless car
A vehicle that is capable of sensing its environment and moving safely with little or no human input.
Service area

Service road

Side road entry treatment, SRET, continuous footway, continuous pavement, Copenhagen crossing
Designing junctions for pedestrian safety and convenience (especially in the United Kingdom)
Sidewalk, footpath, footway, or pavement
A path along the side of a road.
Shoulder
A reserved lane by the verge of a road or motorway.
Shunpiking
The act of deliberately avoiding toll roads by using a toll-free alternate route.
Single carriageway or undivided highway
A road with one, two, or more lanes arranged within a roadway or carriageway with no physical separation of opposing flows of traffic.
Single point urban interchange or SPUI
A variant of the diamond interchange most often used in urban areas where conservation of space is necessitated.
Sleeper lines

Slip road or ramp
A connector road between the intersecting roads of an interchange.
Spaghetti junction
A nickname sometimes given to a complicated or massively intertwined road traffic interchange that resembles a plate of spaghetti. The term was originally used to refer to the Gravelly Hill Interchange on the M6 in Birmingham.

Map of types of special routes

Special route
A prefixed or suffixed numbered road in the United States that forms a loop or spur of a more dominant route of the same route number and system.
Speed bump, speed hump, speed ramp, speed cushion, or speed table
A family of traffic calming devices that use vertical deflection to slow motor-vehicle traffic in order to improve safety conditions.
Speeding
Operating a vehicle at a speed higher than the speed limit of a particular road.
Speed limit
The maximum (or minimum in some cases) speed at which road vehicles may travel legally on particular stretches of road.
Spur route
A highway that branches off of the mainline and goes to an area that is not served by the mainline highway.
SRET

Stack interchange, butterfly junction, or directional interchange
A free-flowing, grade-separated junction between two roads, where movements are handled by semi-directional flyovers or under ramps. Vehicles first exit the main carriageway, then complete the turn via a ramp that crosses both highways, eventually merging with the traffic from the opposite side of the interchange.
State highway, state road, state route, provincial highway, provincial road, or provincial route
A road numbered or maintained by a state or province.
A road numbered or maintained by a national government, where "state" is used in its sense of a nation (for example, state highways in New Zealand).
Stop sign
A traffic sign designed to notify drivers that they must come to a complete stop and make sure no other road users are coming before proceeding.
Straight-line diagram or strip map
A diagram that describes a road and its features along a straight line.
Street
A public thoroughfare in a built environment.
Streetcar

Street name sign or street sign
A traffic sign designed to notify road users what the name of the street is.
Street running or on-street running
The routing of a railroad track or tramway track running directly along public streets, without any grade separation.
Stroad
A type of thoroughfare that is a mix between a street and a road.
Stub ramp, stub street, stub-out, stub, or ski jump

Diagram of a superstreet intersection

Superstreet, restricted crossing U-turn (RCUT), J-turn, or reduced conflict intersection
An at-grade intersection where traffic on the minor road cannot go straight across. Traffic on the minor road wishing to turn left or continue straight must turn right onto the major road, then, a short distance away, use a U-turn (or crossover) lane in the median before either going straight or making a right turn when they intersect the other half of the minor road.
Super two, super two-lane highway, or wide two lane
A two-lane surface road built to highway standards, typically including partial control of access, occasional passing lanes and hard shoulders.

== T ==
Tailgating
When a driver drives behind another vehicle while not leaving sufficient distance to stop without causing a collision if the vehicle in front stops suddenly.
Taxicab, taxi, or cab
A type of vehicle for hire with a driver, used by a single passenger or small group of passengers, often for a non-shared ride.

Diagram of a Texas U-turn

Texas U-turn, Texas turnaround, or loop around
A lane allowing cars traveling on one side of a one-way frontage road to U-turn onto the opposite frontage road (typically crossing over or under a freeway or expressway).
Three-point turn, Y-turn, K-turn, or broken U-turn
A method of turning a vehicle around (making a 180° turn) in close quarters, such as in the middle of a road at a point other than an intersection.
Three-way junction, 3-way junction, 3-way intersection, Y junction, Y intersection, T junction, or T intersection
a type of road intersection with three arms. A Y junction generally has 3 arms of equal size. A T junction also has 3 arms, but one of the arms is generally a minor road connecting to larger road.
Through traffic
Road users passing through an area whose destination is elsewhere.
Ticket system or closed toll collection system
A toll road where motorists pay a toll rate based on the distance traveled from their origin to their destination exit. Motorists take a ticket when entering the road and pay the toll and surrender the ticket upon exiting.
Tollbooth, toll plaza, toll booth, or toll gate
A structure built on a toll road, bridge, or tunnel used for collecting fares from passing traffic.
Toll road, turnpike, or tollway
A road for which a fee (or toll) is assessed for passage.
Tourist road, tourist route, tourist drive, or theme route

Traffic
Pedestrians, ridden or herded animals, vehicles, streetcars, buses and other conveyances, either singly or together, that use roads for purposes of travel.
Traffic bottleneck
A localized disruption of vehicular traffic on a road.
Traffic calming
The practice of making a road safer for motorists, pedestrians, and bicyclists.
Traffic circle

Traffic collision, motor vehicle collision, car crash or car accident
Occurs when a vehicle collides with another vehicle, pedestrian, animal, road debris, or other stationary obstruction.
Traffic cone or pylon
A cone-shaped marker that is placed on roads or footpaths to temporarily redirect traffic in a safe manner.
Traffic congestion
Condition involving slower speeds and longer trip times.
Traffic enforcement camera
A camera used to enforce traffic laws by photographing vehicles whose drivers are in violation of said laws.
Traffic guard, traffic controller, flagman, or flagger
A person who directs traffic through a construction site or other temporary traffic control zone past an area using gestures, signs or flags.
Traffic island, painted island, or ghost island
A solid or painted object in a road that channelises traffic.
Traffic light
Signaling devices positioned at road intersections, pedestrian crossings and other locations to control competing flows of traffic.

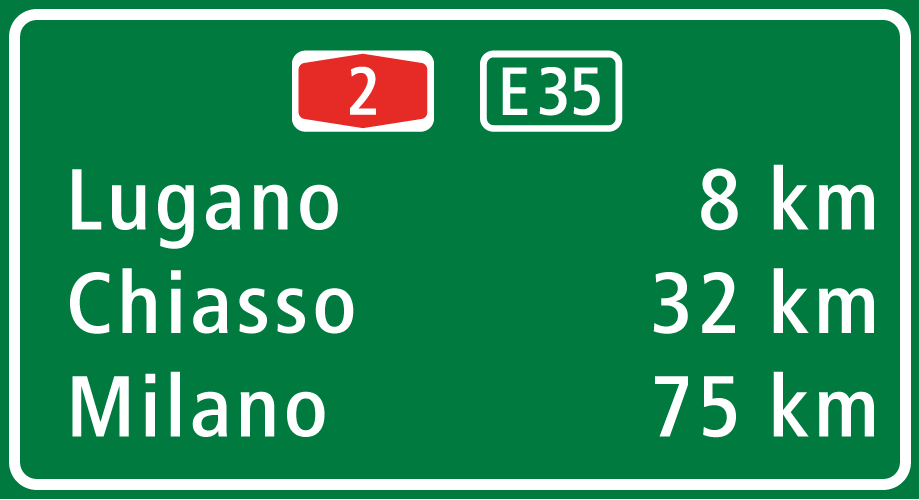
A Swiss road sign telling motorists the distance to the places listed

Traffic police, traffic officers, traffic cops or traffic enforcers
Police officers who direct traffic or enforce the rules of the road.
Traffic sign or road sign
A method of conveying information to people who are using a road. Depending on location, the main color of the sign can tell the motorist what type of information is presented on the sign.
Tram, trolley, or streetcar
A rail vehicle that runs on tramway tracks along public urban streets.
Transit

Transitway

Transportation network company

Travel plaza

Truck or lorry
A vehicle designed to carry cargo.
Truck arrester bed

Truck driver, trucker or truckie, lorry driver, or driver
A person who earns a living by driving a truck.
Truck route
A bypass designed for heavy truck traffic.
Trumpet interchange
An interchange commonly used where one highway terminates at another highway; resembles the bell of a trumpet.
Turbo-T

Turnaround
A type of junction that allows traffic traveling in one direction on a road to efficiently make a U-turn typically without backing up or making dangerous maneuvers in the middle of the traffic stream.
Turn off to stay on (TOTSO)
When a motorist must exit a highway to continue traveling on the same numbered route.
Turn on red
A principle of law permitting vehicles at a traffic light showing a red signal to turn into the direction of traffic nearer to them (almost always after a complete stop) when the way is clear, without having to wait for a green signal.
Two-lane expressway
An expressway with only one lane in each direction, and usually no median barrier.
Two-lane road
A single carriageway with one lane for each direction.

== U ==
Underpass
A bridge, road, railway or similar structure that crosses under another road or railway.
Undivided highway

Unsigned highway
A highway that has been assigned a route number, but does not bear road markings that would conventionally be used to identify the route with that number.
Unused highway, ski jump, stub ramp, stub street, stub-out, or stub
A highway or highway ramp that was partially or fully constructed, but was unused or later closed.
U-turn
A 180° rotation to reverse the direction of travel so called because the maneuver looks like the letter U.

== V ==
Variable-message sign, dynamic message sign, or matrix sign
A traffic sign that can display important messages about special events to motorists. Commute times, weather alerts, Amber alerts, and advanced notices of road construction or accidents are common messages.
Vehicle
A machine that transports people or cargo.
Vehicle for hire
A vehicle providing shared transport, which transports one or more passengers between locations of the passengers' choice.
Vehicle registration plate, license plate or number plate
A metal or plastic plate attached to a motor vehicle or trailer for official identification purposes.

Vienna Convention signs

Speed limit

Curve

No parking

Yield (Give Way)

Round-about

Vienna Convention on Road Signs and Signals
A multilateral treaty designed to increase road safety and aid international road traffic by standardizing the signing system for road traffic (road signs, traffic lights and road markings) in use internationally.
Vienna Convention on Road Traffic
An international treaty designed to facilitate international road traffic and to increase road safety by establishing standard traffic rules among the contracting parties.

== W ==
Weave
Weaving typically occurs at interchanges. Cloverleaf interchanges are especially prone to weaving when an entering vehicle tries to merge into a traffic lane while another vehicle is attempting to exit from the same lane. Weaving also occurs when vehicles enter traffic from inner lanes and must quickly exit from outer lanes.
Weigh station
A checkpoint along a highway to inspect vehicular weights. Usually, trucks and commercial vehicles are subject to the inspection.

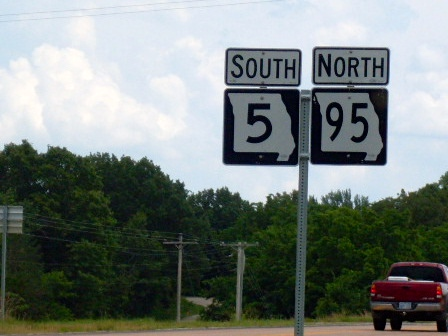
A wrong-way concurrency in Missouri

White line fever

Wide two lane

Wildlife crossing
A structure built to allow animals to cross a road safely.
Work area or work zone

Wrong-way concurrency
A concurrency between two roads with opposite signed directions, e.g. a westbound highway and an eastbound highway. Often, the physical roadbed is actually headed in a totally different cardinal direction.

== X ==
XDL

"Trail x-ing" MUTCD sign

Xing or x-ing
An abbreviation for road crossing, primarily used in North America and in the Philippines.

== Y ==
Yellow trap
Occurs at a traffic light when oncoming traffic has an extended green period.
Y junction or Y intersection

Yield sign
A traffic sign used to indicate that each driver must prepare to stop if necessary to let a driver on another approach proceed.
Y-turn

== Z ==
Zebra crossing
A pedestrian crossing marked by alternating dark and light stripes, which typically gives extra rights of way to pedestrians.

== See also ==
- Road transport
- List of roads and highways
- Glossary of the American trucking industry
