= Interstate Highway standards =

Design standards for the Interstate Highway System in the United States

Blank markers used for one- and two-digit (left) or three-digit and suffixed (right) Interstates

Standards for Interstate Highways in the United States are defined by the American Association of State Highway and Transportation Officials (AASHTO) with several publications such as the A Policy on Design Standards: Interstate System. For a certain highway to be considered an Interstate Highway, it must meet these construction requirements or obtain a waiver from the Federal Highway Administration.

== Standards ==
Standardization helps keep road design consistent, such that drivers can learn the consistent features and drive accordingly. Standardization can therefore decrease accidents and increase driver safety.

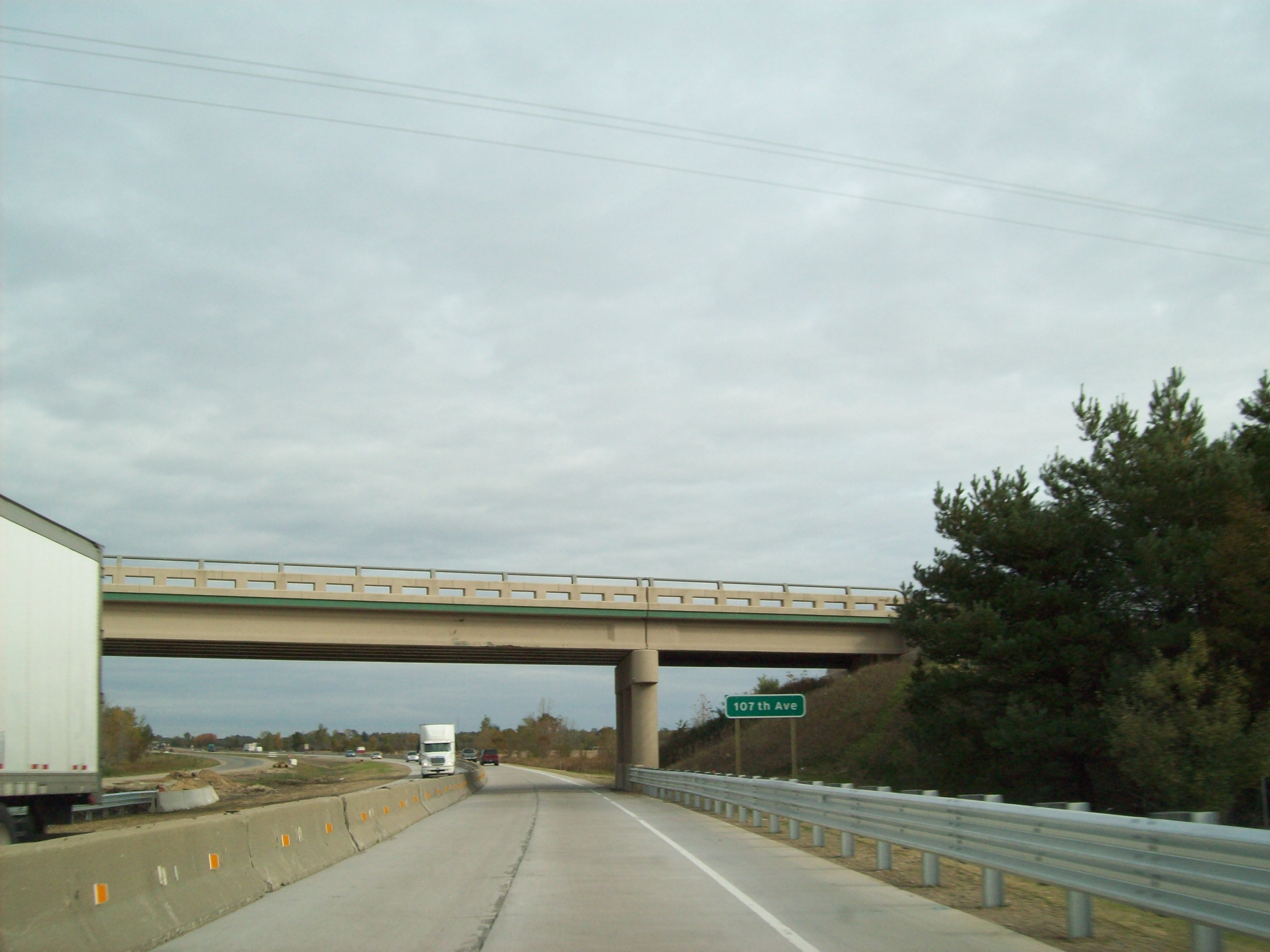
An Interstate Highway under construction (I-196), with both directions of traffic moved to one side of the roadway

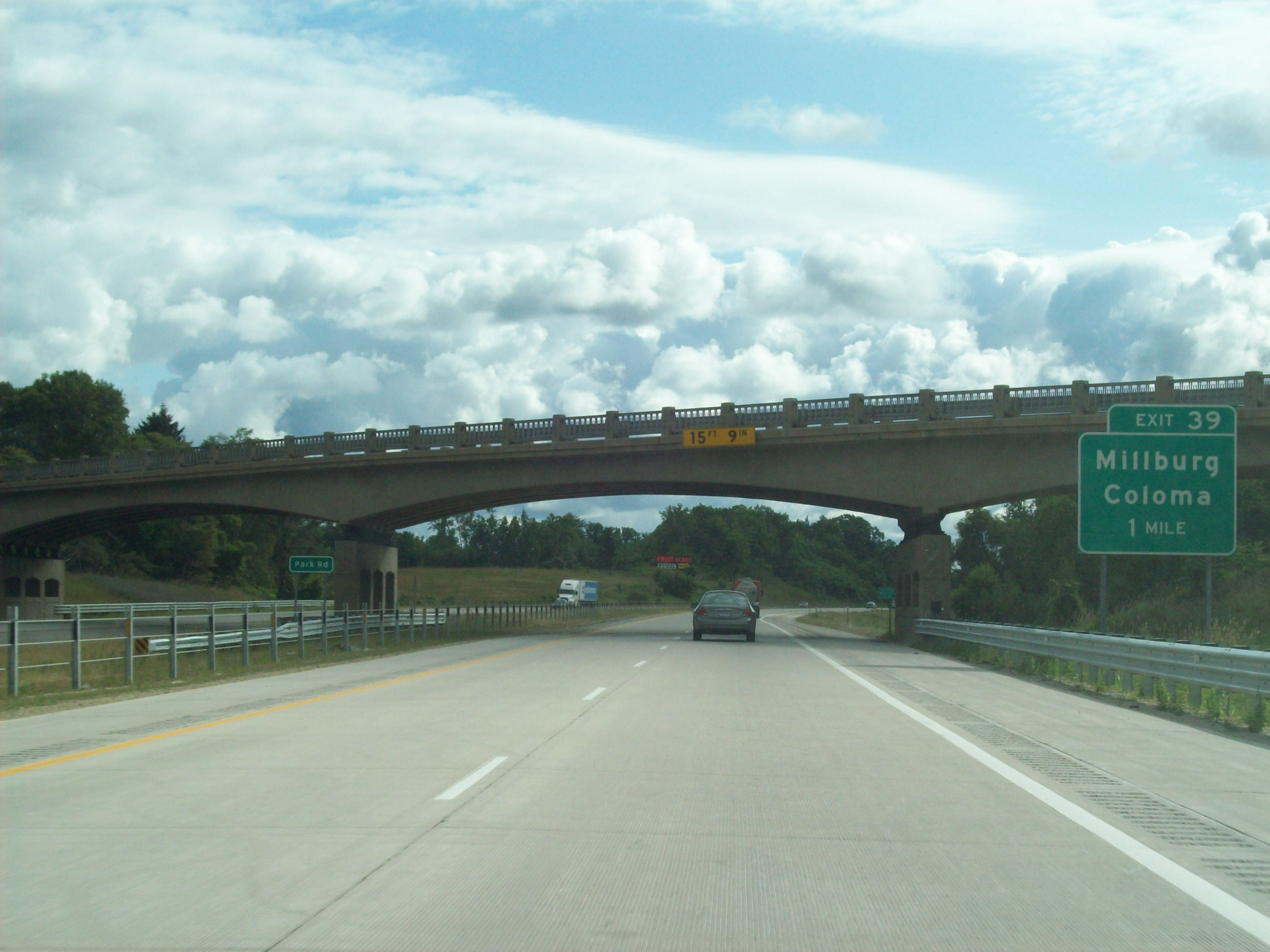
I-94 in Michigan, showing examples of non-interchange overpass signage in median, upcoming exit signage on right shoulder, a pre-1960 overpass with height restriction signage, newly installed cable median barrier, and parallel grooved pavement with shoulder rumble strips

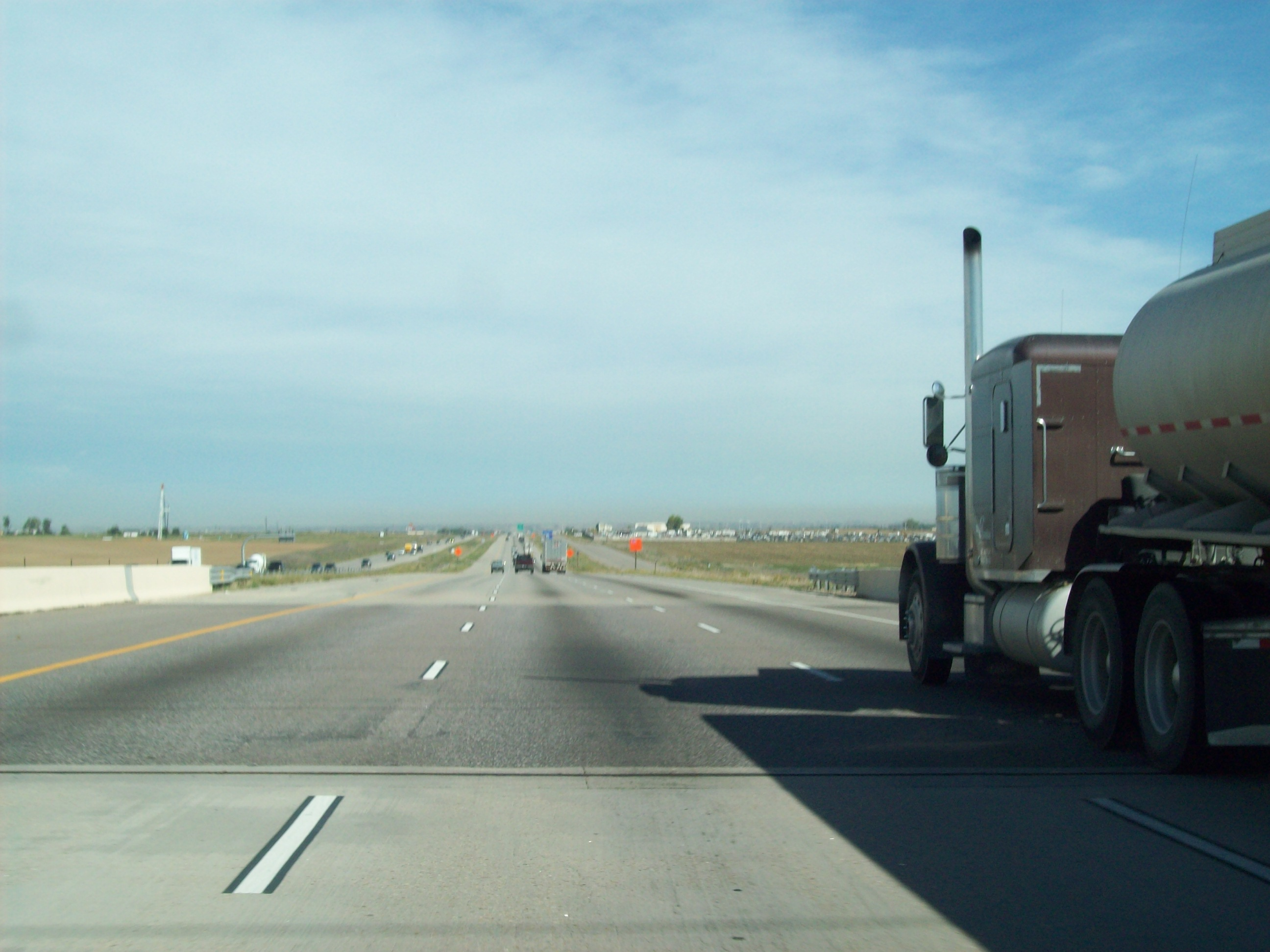
An Interstate Highway bridge with an asphalt overlay

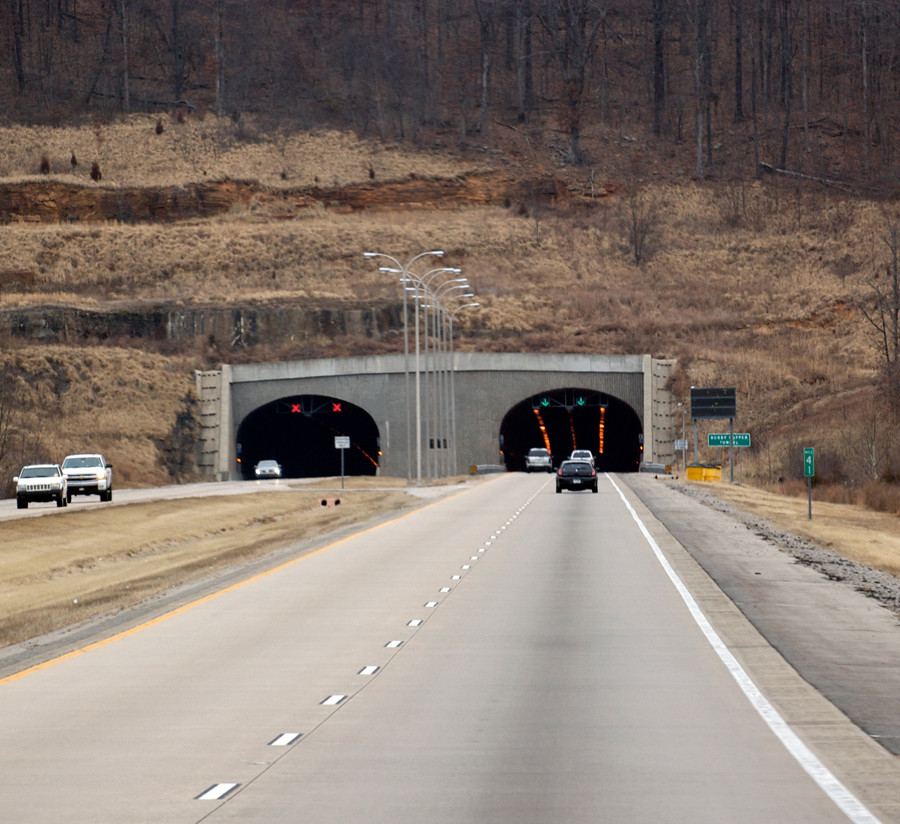
The Bobby Hopper Tunnel on I-49 in Arkansas was built with a 25 ft (7.6 m) height total clearance, leaving plenty of room for lighting and signs hanging from the ceiling and still exceeding the 16 ft (4.9 m) minimum for rural highways. Side clearances were reduced from the recommended 44.0 ft (13.4 m) to 38.0 ft (11.6 m) due to cost concerns.

These standards are, as of May 2023:

- Controlled access: All access onto and off the highway is to be controlled with interchanges and grade separations, including all railroad crossings. Interchanges are to provide access to and from both directions of the highway and both directions of the crossroad. Interchanges should be spaced at least 1 mi (1.6 km) apart in urban areas and 3 mi (4.8 km) apart in rural areas; collector/distributor roads or other roadway configurations that reduce weaving can be used in urban areas to shorten this distance.
  - In urban areas, there should be no driveways or other access points to adjacent properties along the crossroad for at least 100 feet (30 m) from entrance and exit ramps, in both directions, and for at least 300 feet (91 m) in rural areas.
  - In urban and suburban areas, consideration should be given to accommodating bicycles and pedestrians along crossroads.
- Minimum design speed: A minimum design speed of 70 mph (113 km/h) is to be used, except in mountainous and urban areas, where the minimum is 50 mph (80 km/h).
  - The sight distance, curvature and superelevation of the highway should follow the current edition of AASHTO's A Policy on Geometric Design of Highways and Streets for the chosen design speed.
- Maximum grade: The maximum permissible vertical angle, or grade, along the highway is determined from terrain and design speed, with up to 6% generally allowed in mountainous areas, 5% in rolling terrain, and 4% on level terrain. An additional 1% is allowed in urban areas.
- Minimum number of lanes: There are to be at least two lanes in each direction, unless more are necessary for an acceptable level of service, according to the current edition of AASHTO's A Policy on Geometric Design of Highways and Streets. Climbing lanes and emergency escape ramps should be provided where appropriate.
- Minimum lane width: The minimum lane width is 12 feet (3.7 m), identical to most US and state highways.
- Shoulder width: The minimum width of the left paved shoulder is 4 feet (1.2 m), and of the right paved shoulder 10 feet (3.0 m). With three or more lanes in each direction, both shoulders are to be at least 10 feet (3.0 m) wide. In mountainous terrain, a left shoulder of 4 feet (1.2 m) and a right shoulder of 8 feet (2.4 m) are acceptable, except where there are at least four lanes in each direction, in which case both shoulders are to be at least 8 feet (2.4 m) wide. In places with higher truck traffic, over 250 directional design hour volume, wider shoulders should be considered.
- Pavement sloping: On straight sections of the highway, the roadway is to have a cross slope of at least 1.5%, and preferably 2% to ensure proper drainage, with up to 2.5% in areas of heavy rainfall. The cross slope of both the left and right shoulders should be between 2% and 6%, but not less than the main lanes.
- Median width: The median should have a width of least 50 feet (15 m), and preferably 60 feet (18 m), in rural areas, and 10 feet (3.0 m), plus a barrier, in urban or mountainous areas.
- Recovery areas: There should be no fixed objects in the clear zone, the width of which should be determined by the design speed in accordance with the current edition of AASHTO's Roadside Design Guide. When this is not possible, breakaway supports or barriers guarding the objects should be used. Special care should be taken in depressed highways, where piers and walls should be placed at least 2 feet (0.61 m) beyond the outer edge of either shoulder. Slopes in the clear zone should be at most 1:4, and should typically be 1:6.
- Curbs: No curb is to be placed nearer to the roadway than the outside edge of the paved shoulder. Any curb is to have a sloping, and not a vertical face, and be no more than 4 inches (10 cm) in height. Special care should be taken when curbs are combined with barriers.
- Vertical clearance: The minimum vertical clearance under overhead structures, such as bridges, is 16 feet (4.9 m), including both paved shoulders and an allowance for extra layers of pavement. Through urban areas, at least one routing is to have 16-foot (4.9 m) clearances, but others may have a lesser clearance of 14 feet (4.3 m). Sign supports and pedestrian overpasses must be at least 17 feet (5.2 m) above the road, except on urban routes with lesser clearance, where they should be at least 1 foot (30 cm) higher than other objects. The cross bracing of truss bridges has a special additional clearance requirement of 17.5 feet (5.3 m).
- Bridges: Bridges less than 200 feet (61 m) long should carry the full width of the roadway, including the paved shoulders. Longer bridges can reduce the width of both shoulders to 4 feet (1.2 m).
  - Existing bridges can remain part of the Interstate system if they have at least 12-foot-wide (3.7 m) lanes with 3.5-foot (1.1 m) shoulder on the left and a 10-foot (3.0 m) shoulder on the right, except that longer bridges can have 3.5 feet (1.1 m) shoulders on both sides. For all bridges, the railing should be upgraded if necessary.
- Tunnel clearance: Tunnels should not differ significantly from bridges, but because of the high costs of tunnels, the width of both shoulders may be reduced to 4 feet (120 cm). An exit walkway 4 feet (120 cm) wide is also required, which should either be elevated or separated from the roadway with a barrier. In addition, access for emergency responders needs to be accommodated. The minimum vertical clearance is the same as it is under bridges.
- Markings: All road markings should be retroreflective.

== Exceptions ==
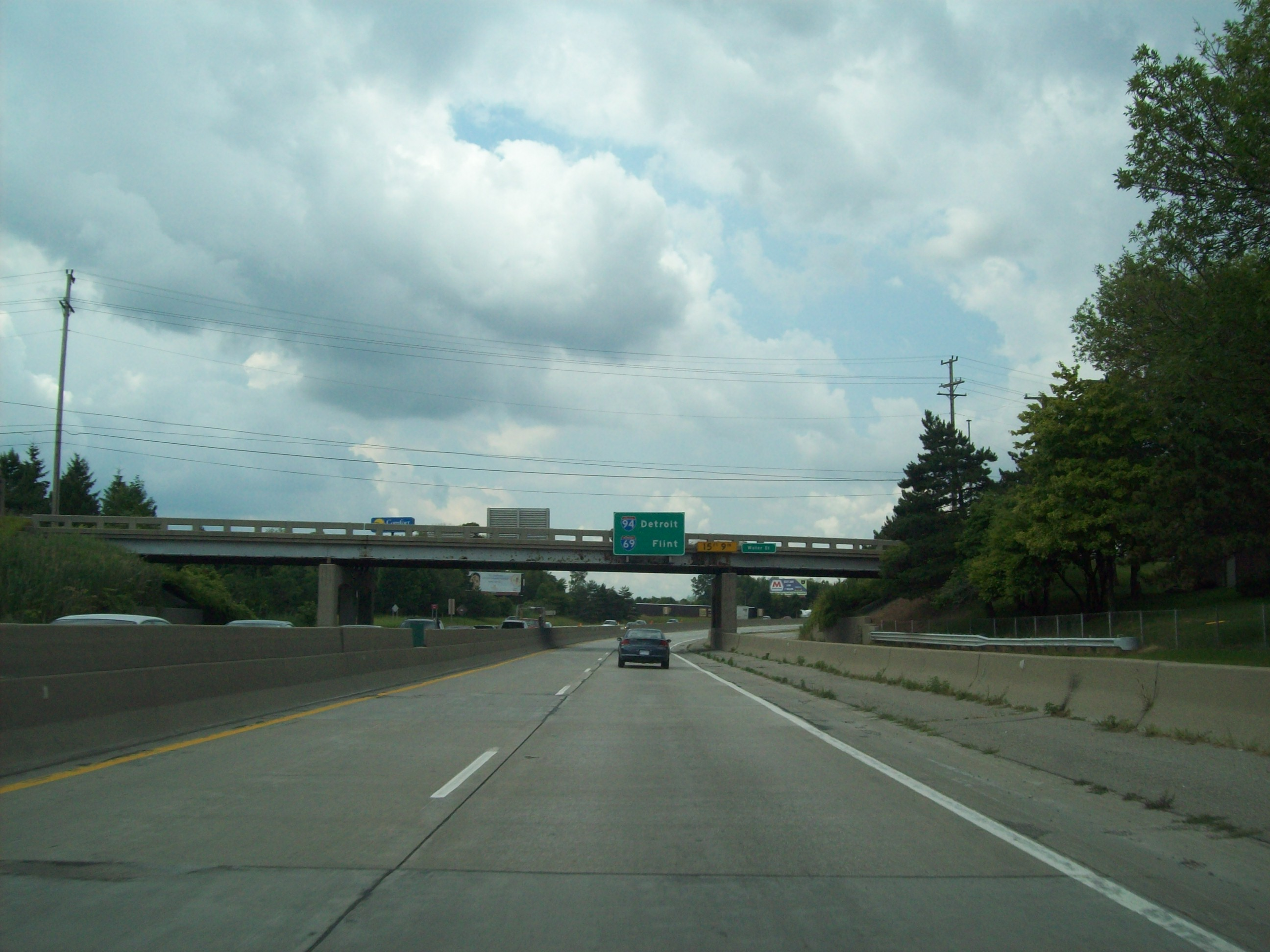
A narrow, older "grandfathered" section of I-94/I-69 after entering Michigan from Sarnia, Ontario. This section has since been reconstructed to modern standards.

Interstate standards have changed over the years, which has resulted in many older roads not conforming to current standards and an increase of roads not being built to these standards because to do so would be too costly or environmentally unsound.

Some roads were grandfathered into the system. Most of these were toll roads that were built before the Interstate system came into existence or were under construction at the time President Dwight D. Eisenhower signed the Federal-Aid Highway Act of 1956.

An example is the Pennsylvania Turnpike, which originally had a very narrow median that later required the installation of a steel guardrail and later a Jersey barrier due to heavy traffic loads. The Kansas Turnpike had a 20-foot (6.1 m) depressed median (16 feet [4.9 m] narrower than the Interstate minimum) along its entire 236-mile (380 km) length from its opening in 1956 through the mid-1980s when Jersey barriers were installed.

Interstate 35E through Saint Paul, Minnesota, is an example of a freeway that was not grandfathered into the system but is nonetheless an exception to standards. Initially designed in the 1960s, but not opened until 1990, the freeway has a speed limit of 45 mph (72 km/h), and does not allow vehicles weighing over 9,000 pounds (4,100 kg) gross vehicle weight (GVW). This is due to political opposition from surrounding homeowners in local neighborhoods, which greatly delayed and modified the project. Interstate 670, a spur of Interstate 70, also fails to reach the 50 mile per hour minimum and instead passes through Downtown Kansas City, Missouri at 45 miles per hour.

Interstate 75 on the Mackinac Bridge between St. Ignace and Mackinaw City, Michigan, is undivided. The bridge was designed before the start of the Interstate Highway System, and it was grandfathered into the system.

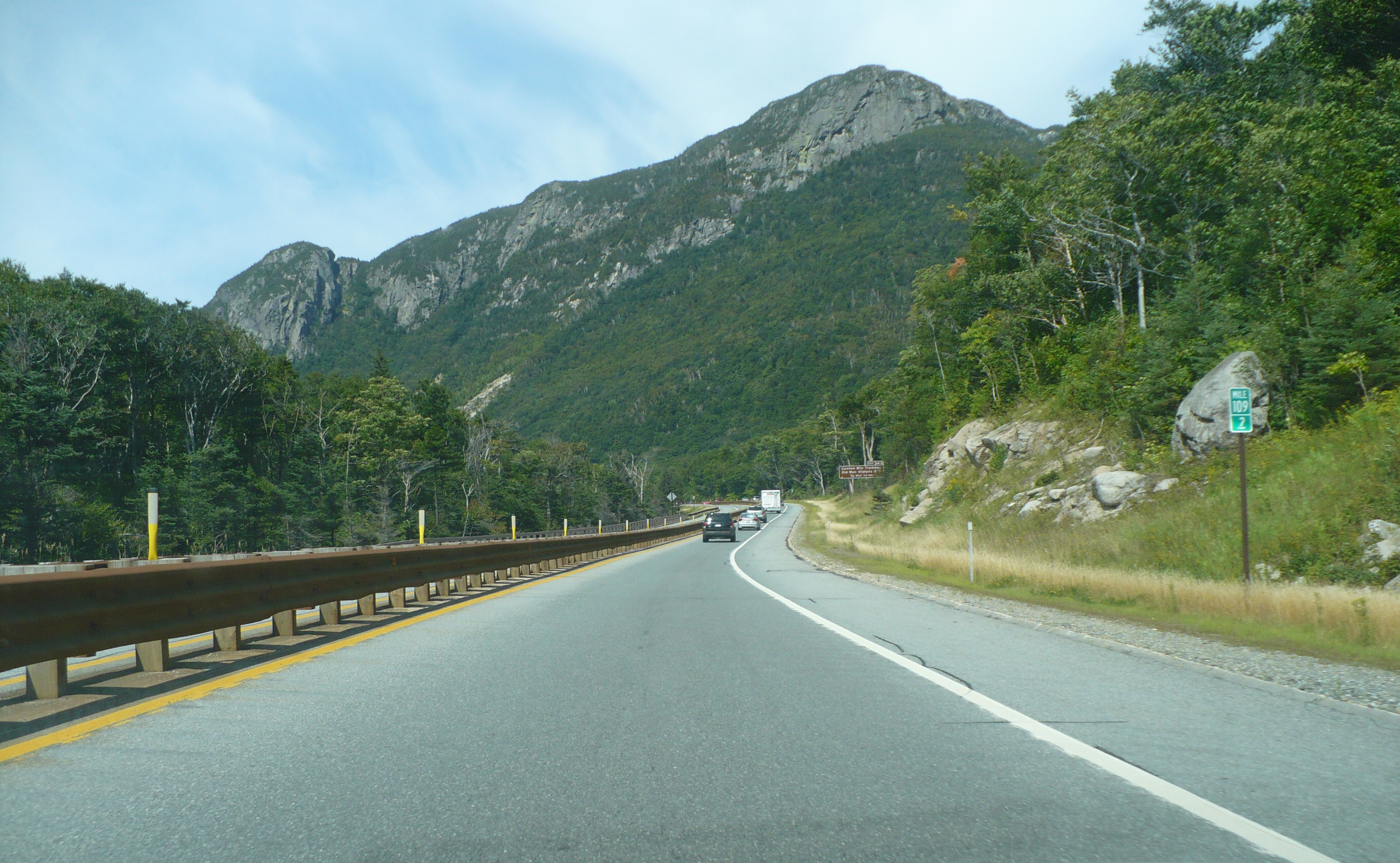
Interstate 93 super two through Franconia Notch, New Hampshire

Interstate 93 through Franconia Notch, New Hampshire is also a notable exception, being a super two parkway with a speed limit of 45 mph (72 km/h).

All of the unsigned Interstates in Alaska and Puerto Rico are exempt from Interstate Highway standards and are instead, per Title 23, Chapter 1, Section 103 of the U.S. Code, "designed in accordance with such geometric and construction standards as are adequate for current and probable future traffic demands and the needs of the locality of the highway".
