= Jughandle =

Diversionary road used for making turns at an intersection

A jughandle intersection (Type A in New Jersey) where turning traffic is diverted away from the main intersection to a slip road

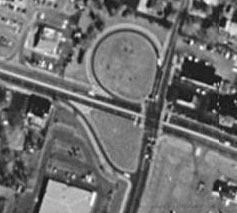
A typical jughandle setup, with one standard jughandle (below) and one reverse jughandle (above), on New Jersey Route 35 in Hazlet, New Jersey, United States. 40.420996°N 74.185092°W

A jughandle is a type of ramp or slip road that changes the way traffic turns left at an at-grade intersection (in a country where traffic drives on the right). Instead of a standard left turn being made from the left lane, left-turning traffic uses a ramp on the right side of the road. In a standard forward jughandle or near-side jughandle, the ramp leaves before the intersection, and left-turning traffic turns left off of it rather than the through road; right turns are also made using the jughandle. In a reverse jughandle or far-side jughandle, the ramp leaves after the intersection, and left-turning traffic loops around to the right and merges with the crossroad before the intersection.

The jughandle is also known as a Jersey left due to its high prevalence within the U.S. state of New Jersey (though this term is also locally used for an illegal abrupt left at the beginning of a green light cycle). The New Jersey Department of Transportation defines three types of jughandles. "Type A" is the standard forward jughandle. "Type B" is a variant with no cross-street intersected by the jughandle; it curves 90 degrees left to meet the main street, and is either used at a "T" intersection or for a U-turn only. "Type C" is the standard reverse jughandle.

== History ==
A 1956 article in the Asbury Park Press cited a suggestion by the state's top highway planner to add a "jug-handle" on Route 35 to facilitate the flow of traffic. One of the earliest mentions of jughandles in The New York Times is on June 14, 1959, referring to jughandles having been built in New Jersey on U.S. Route 46 in Montville, U.S. Route 22 between North Plainfield and Bound Brook, and Route 35 at Monmouth Park Racetrack, with the article citing the addition of "jug-handle exits" as a way to reduce accidents. By the beginning of 1960, New Jersey had 160 jughandles, most if not all standard before-intersection jughandles. The 160th one was on U.S. Route 1 between New Brunswick and Trenton. Jughandles had been introduced in the 1940s as a way to keep turning vehicles away from the flow of traffic on main roads, but by 2013 a bill to ban the jughandle had made it to the floor of the New Jersey Senate.

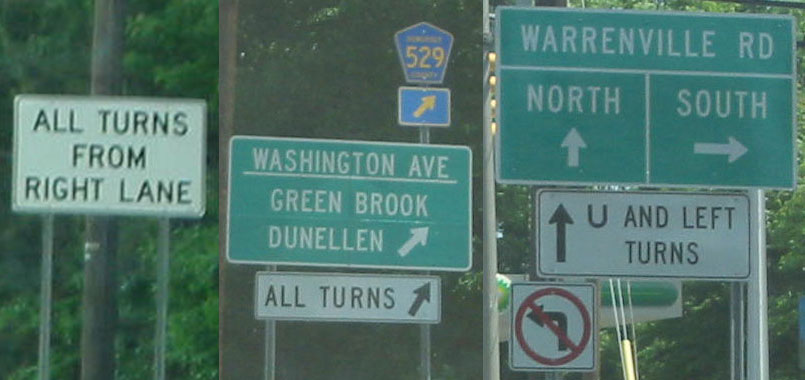
Examples of signage at jughandles on New Jersey state highways.

== Usage ==
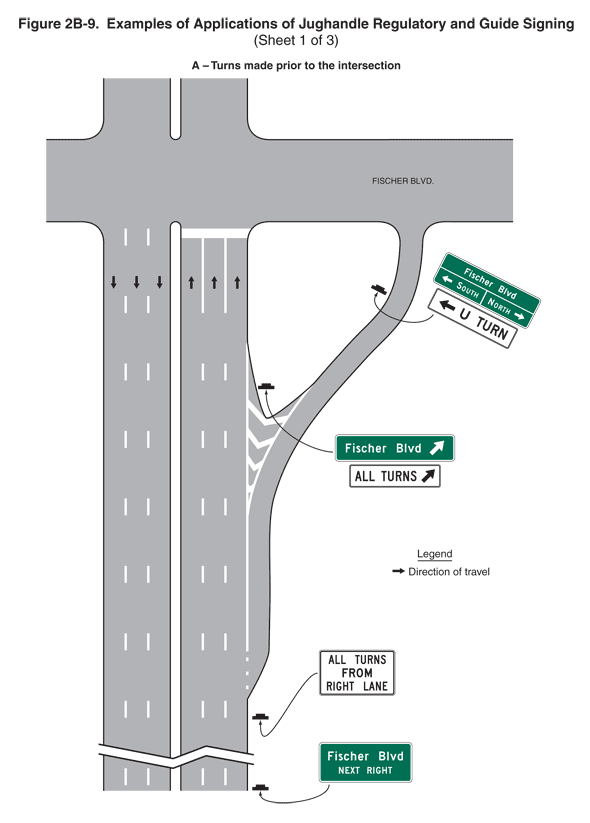
Diagram of a jughandle intersection. All turning traffic exits to the right, before entering the cross road turning either to the left or right.

=== Australia ===
In Perth, Western Australia

- Guildford Road at East Parade (reverse jughandle) 31.936791°S 115.879871°E

=== Canada ===
In Brantford, Ontario:

- Veterans Memorial Parkway at Blackburn Drive 43.12367°N 80.28181°W

In Nanaimo, British Columbia:

- Highway 1 south to Highway 19A 49.241102°N 124.063721°W

In Markham, Ontario:

- Warden Avenue at Enterprise Boulevard (busway) 43.848694°N 79.332178°W

In Toronto, Ontario:

- York University Busway at Dufferin Street (busway) 43.771879°N 79.46766°W
- Kingston Road at Midland Avenue 43.7108314°N 79.2481828°W

In Chambly, Quebec:

- Boulevard de Peringy at Avenue Bourgogne 45.441069°N 73.258781°W

In Sherwood Park, Alberta:

- Baseline Road at 17 Street 53.540244°N 113.367947°W

=== Finland ===
There is one on European route E63 near Orivesi.

=== Germany ===
In Cologne, North Rhine-Westphalia:

- Aachener Straße at Universitätsstraße, 50.935794°N 6.925278°E
- Innerer Grüngürtel at Innere Kanalstraße and Subbelrather Straße 50.949062°N 6.933751°E

=== Singapore ===
In Tampines:

- Junction of Tampines Avenue 10 and Tampines Avenue 1 1.350244°N 103.926112°E

In Kallang:

- Junction of Mountbatten Road and Fort Road 1.300877°N 103.885535°E

=== Sweden ===
57.3057126°N 16.4614768°E

=== United Kingdom ===
In England:

- A322 at Bagshot, 51.3613°N 0.6838°W

In Northern Ireland:

- A8 at Ashley Road, 54.7111687°N 5.9676731°W

=== United States ===
While jughandles are largely associated with New Jersey, the states of Connecticut, Delaware, Hawaii, Maryland, Massachusetts, Michigan, Missouri, New Hampshire, New York, Ohio, Pennsylvania, Wisconsin, and Vermont also use jughandles at several intersections. Jughandles are possible in other locations as they are a valid type of intersection control to consider for intersection design.

== Signage ==
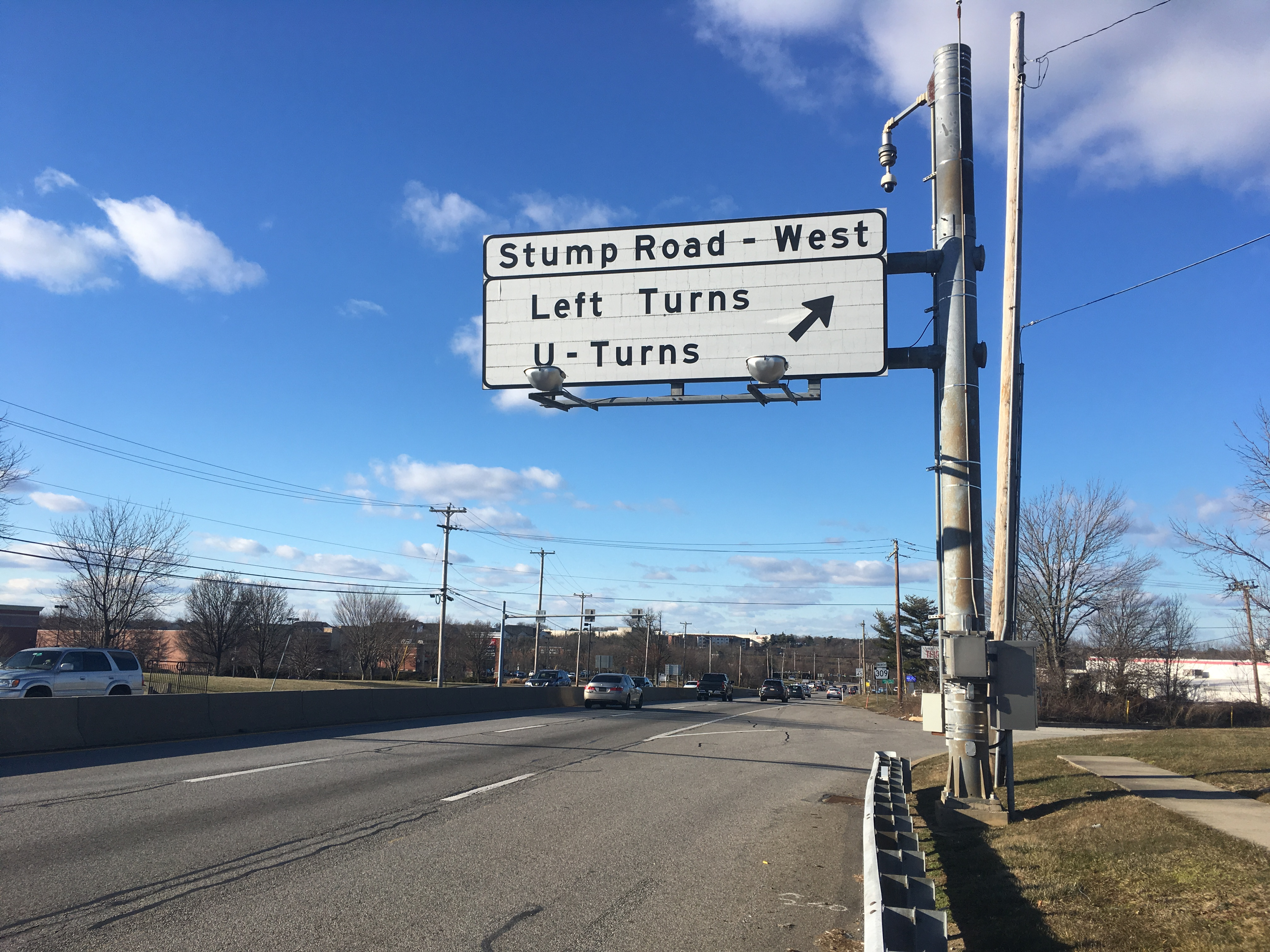
Signage for a jughandle along Pennsylvania Route 309 in Montgomery Township, Pennsylvania

On New Jersey State Highways and Pennsylvania State Highways, a white sign is placed before a jughandle or at the beginning of a stretch of jughandles saying "All turns from right lane", or a similar message. Each jughandle is marked with a white sign below the standard green sign, saying "All turns", or "U and left turns" in the case of a reverse jughandle.

On locally maintained roads, and in other states, jughandle signage can appear to be haphazard and confusing to out of state drivers.

== Advantages ==
- Safety
  - Removes left-turning vehicles from travel lanes, particularly from higher-speed left lanes.
  - Pedestrian crossing distance is reduced across the mainline.
  - Reduced left-turn conflict points as compared to a standard four-leg intersection.
  - Removes conflicts with right-turning vehicles and pedestrians/bicyclists at the primary intersection.
- Operations
  - Reduced average delays, total travel time, and number of stops through the intersection in near saturated traffic conditions.
  - Higher intersection capacity for left turning vehicles.
  - Provides u-turn opportunity for larger vehicles on roadways with narrow median
  - Reduced signal phases due to the elimination of the associated left-turn phase(s).
  - Shorter pedestrian crossing distance across the mainline may provide for shorter cross street signal phases.
  - Reduced need for rights-of-way acquisition when there is not any room for a left turning lane; focuses land requirement near intersection rather than a long stretch that is often highly developed.

== Disadvantages ==
- Safety
  - Driver confusion, due to left-turns being made from the right side of the roadway – an uncommon configuration outside of the northeastern United States. Expectancy issues may be compounded due to inconsistency between intersections, where some intersections may be jughandles and others may be standard intersections. These issues can be reduced through advance signing.
  - Pedestrian conflict is increased along the cross street due to the addition of an additional intersecting approach.
  - Creates a higher-speed conflict between vehicles and pedestrians/bicyclists at the divergence point of the jughandle ramp.
- Operations
  - Potential for increased travel time and delay for left-turning motorists redirected through jughandle.
  - Potential for queues along the cross street to block the exit terminal of the jughandle, increasing stops, delays, and travel time of left-turning motorists.
  - Increased overall percentage of vehicles stopped at the intersection.
  - With reverse jughandles, motorists travel through the intersection twice: adding to the net movement demand.
  - Motorists wishing to perform a U-turn maneuver at a reverse jughandle must perform a weaving maneuver across all cross-street lanes to travel from the jughandle terminus to the left-turn lane (unless another reverse jughandle is located on the other corner on the side of the cross street ahead of the motorist's original direction, in which case the motorist stays on the right but must cross through the intersection three times).
  - To provide for motorist safety, the Federal Highway Administration recommends locating transit stops further from the intersection, outside of the jughandle ramps. This can reduce pedestrian demand due to the additional travel distance to access the transit stop.
  - "Type A" standard forward jughandles can encourage drivers to try beating (bypassing) the stopped redlight traffic by driving into the jughandle, turning left, and then turning right onto the original roadway to proceed in the original direction of travel prior to that roadway's light turning green again and releasing the stopped traffic.
- Right-of-way
  - Additional right-of-way may be required alongside the roadway, unless the existing street network can be utilized.

== See also ==
- Hook turn
- Michigan left
