= Road crossing =

Road crossing may refer to:

- Road intersection
- Railroad crossing (or level crossing)
- Pedestrian crossing
- Strand Road Crossing, a terminus in the United Kingdom

== See also ==
- Road (disambiguation)
- Crossing (disambiguation)
- Bike crossing (disambiguation)
