= Demountable copy =

Method of manufacturing road signs

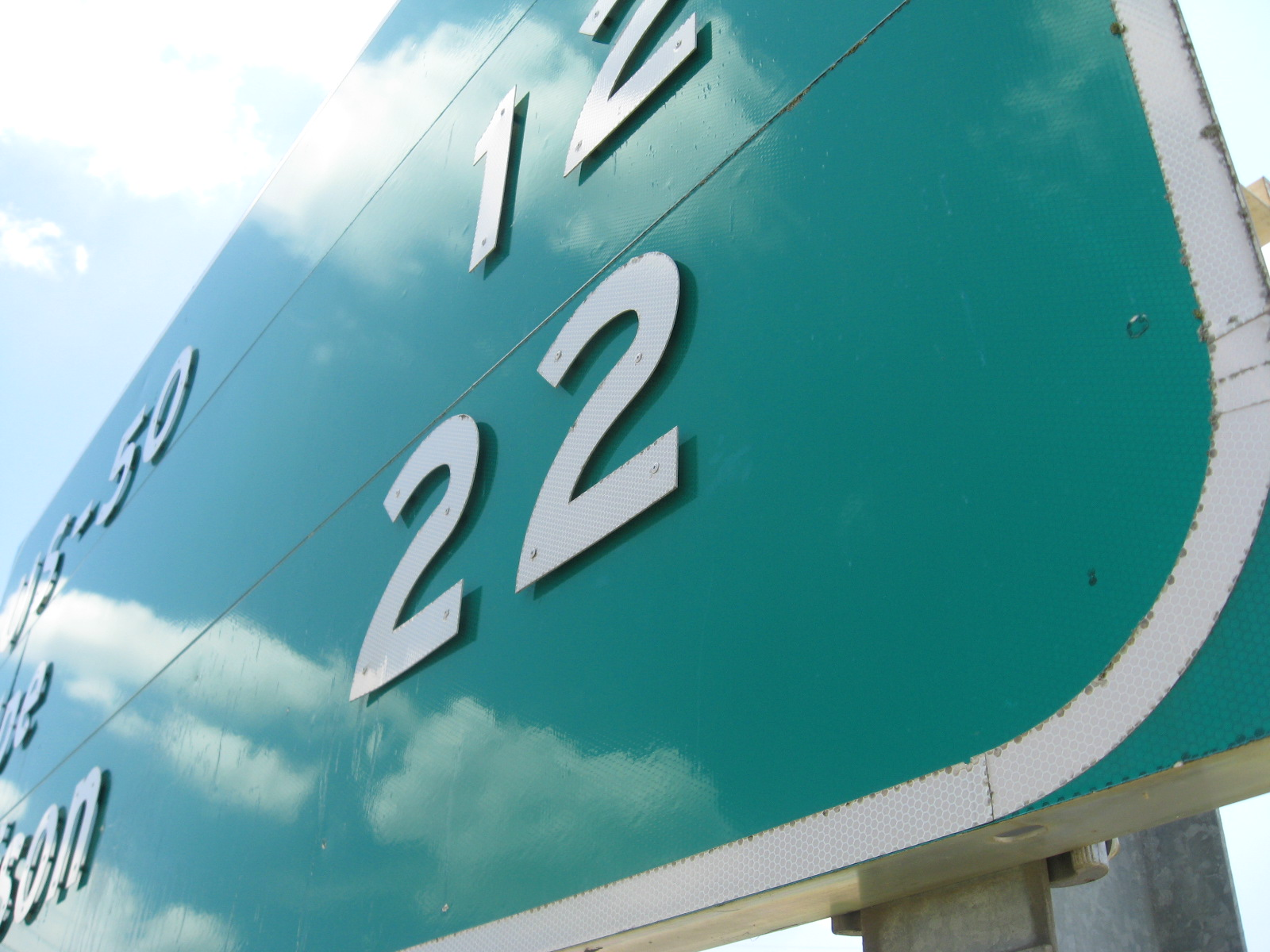
A demountable copy sign along K-99 in Emporia, Kansas

Demountable copy is a form of traffic sign in which mass-produced sheet-metal characters (and graphics, such as route shields and arrows) are attached to the sign face through means such as screws, rivets and adhesives.

Because of the ability to remove the preformed metal characters from the sign, demountable-copy signs can be easily altered to change their message by removing unwanted sections of the legend and installing new elements.

Some states formerly applied their demountable characters to non-retroreflective sheeting but phased out the process when the glue used began to leak and damage the signs.

== See also ==
- Button copy, older style of sign manufacture no longer commonly used
- Retroreflective sheeting, common material for direct-applied copy
