= Bobby Hopper Tunnel =

Tunnel in Arkansas

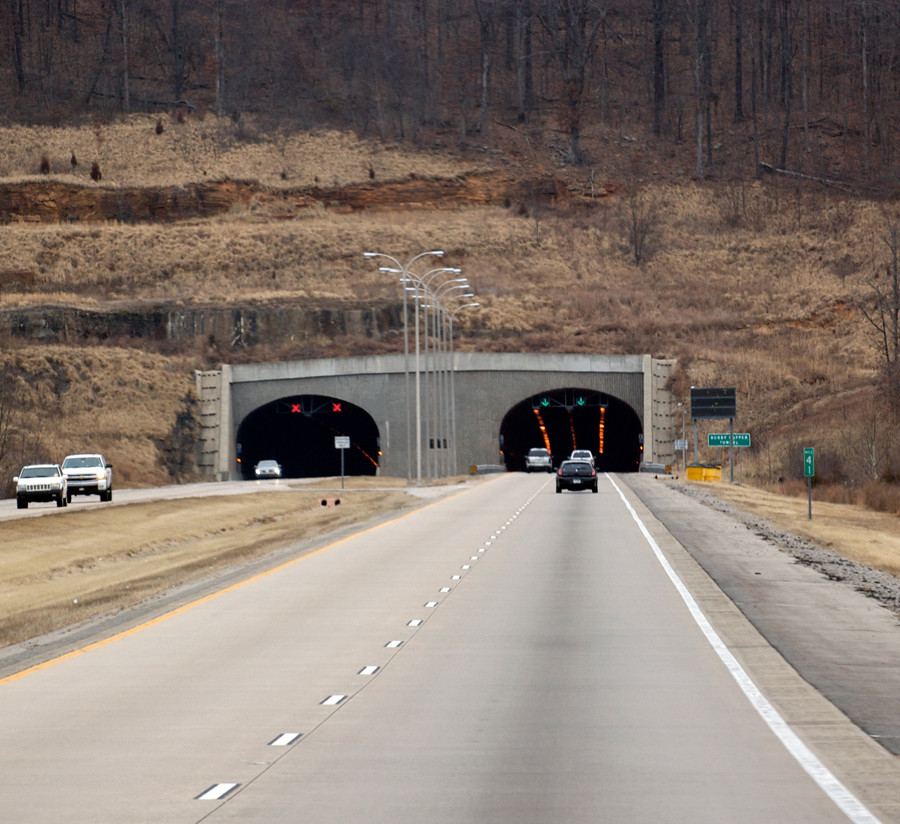
- Entering the tunnel northbound

Overview
- Other name: Bunyard Tunnel (prior to designation)
- Location: Unnamed mountain near Winslow, Arkansas, in south Washington County
- Coordinates: 35.7674°N 94.1896°W
- Route: I-49

Operation
- Opened: 1999; 27 years ago
- Operator: Arkansas Department of Transportation
- Traffic: 16,000 (2009)

Technical
- Design engineer: J. F. Shea Company
- Length: 1,595.2 ft (486.2 m)
- No. of lanes: 4
- Operating speed: 75 miles per hour (121 km/h)
- Tunnel clearance: 25 ft (7.6 m)
- Width: 38 ft (12 m)

Route map

The Bobby Hopper Tunnel is a highway tunnel on Interstate 49 (I-49) in Arkansas, just north of the Crawford—Washington county line. It opened in 1999 to four lanes of traffic. No toll is charged.

== Description ==
The tunnel's twin bores are each 1,595.2 feet (486.2 m) long, 38 feet (12 m) wide and 25 feet (7.6 m) tall (as measured from the roadway to the top of the tunnel arch), allowing for two lanes of traffic and shoulder space in each bore. A prominent feature of the tunnel is the noticeably inclined gradient of each bore and its associated roadway. Given that the north end of the tunnel is at a considerably lower elevation than the south end, northbound traffic experiences a significant descending (downhill) gradient inside the tunnel, while southbound traffic experiences a corresponding ascending (uphill) gradient. Cross-passages occur every 265 feet (81 m) allowing for five emergency ways in. Besides paved openings, the tunnel has traffic signals, lighting, message signs, carbon monoxide monitors, fire protection, and closed-circuit television systems to monitor traffic remotely at the Fort Smith highway department district headquarters.

The tunnel was named for the director of the Arkansas Highway Commission (a resident of nearby Springdale, Arkansas) during the time of its construction. While there are eight railway tunnels in Arkansas, the Bobby Hopper Tunnel is the only highway tunnel in the state.

== History ==
U.S. Route 71 (US 71), once classified as "one of the most dangerous highways in America", includes a perilous stretch between Alma and Fayetteville through the Ozark Plateau. Thus, construction of an alternate route was designed to make the trip safer, as well as reducing travel time. Approved in 1987 and completed in 1999, at a cost of $458 million, the alternate route, I-540, eventually renamed I-49, had an obstacle of an unnamed 1,800-foot-tall (550 m) peak just north of the Washington—Crawford county line, in what John Haman of Arkansas Business called "smack in the middle of motoring wilderness." A tunnel feasibility study was awarded to Garver USA, which subcontracted with Sverdrup Corporation of Maryland Heights, Missouri, and TapanAm Associates, Inc., of Kansas City, Missouri, to determine the best option—a tunnel. The alternative would disfigure the topography and necessitate a 200-foot (61 m) cut creating 8 million cubic yards (6.1×10^{6} m^{3}) of debris to be disposed, as it was not usable within the project.

At an elevation of 1,640 feet (500 m) above sea level, twin parallel tunnels were mined, not bored, through the mountain in a horseshoe contour, since a circular shape, like that used in sewer or train projects, was not needed. Blasting, drilling, and excavation removed native shale and sandstone rocks, slowly chipping to the desired width and length. The hollowed-out channel was lined with reinforced concrete, as were both openings.
