= Button copy =

Method of manufacturing road signs

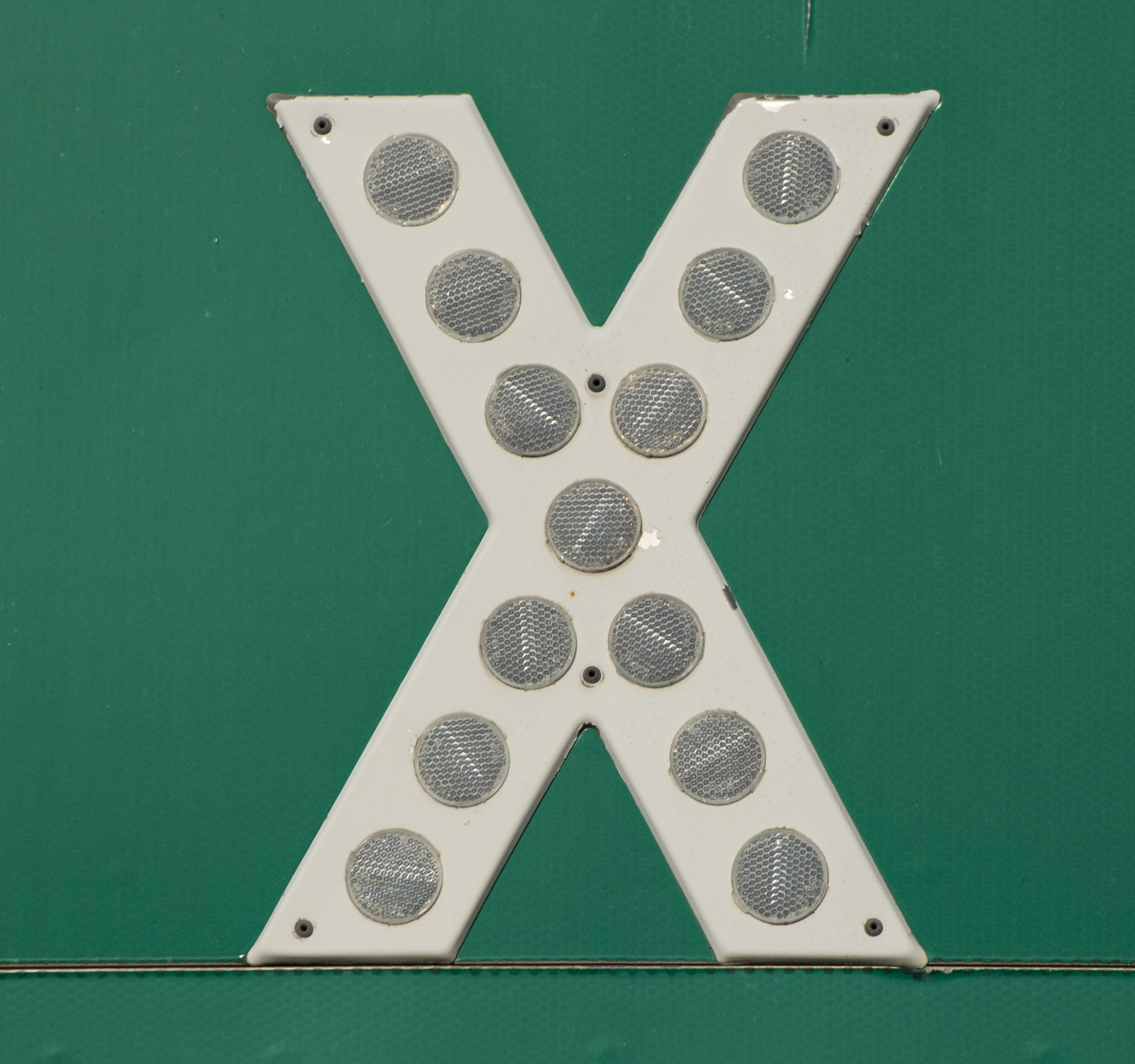
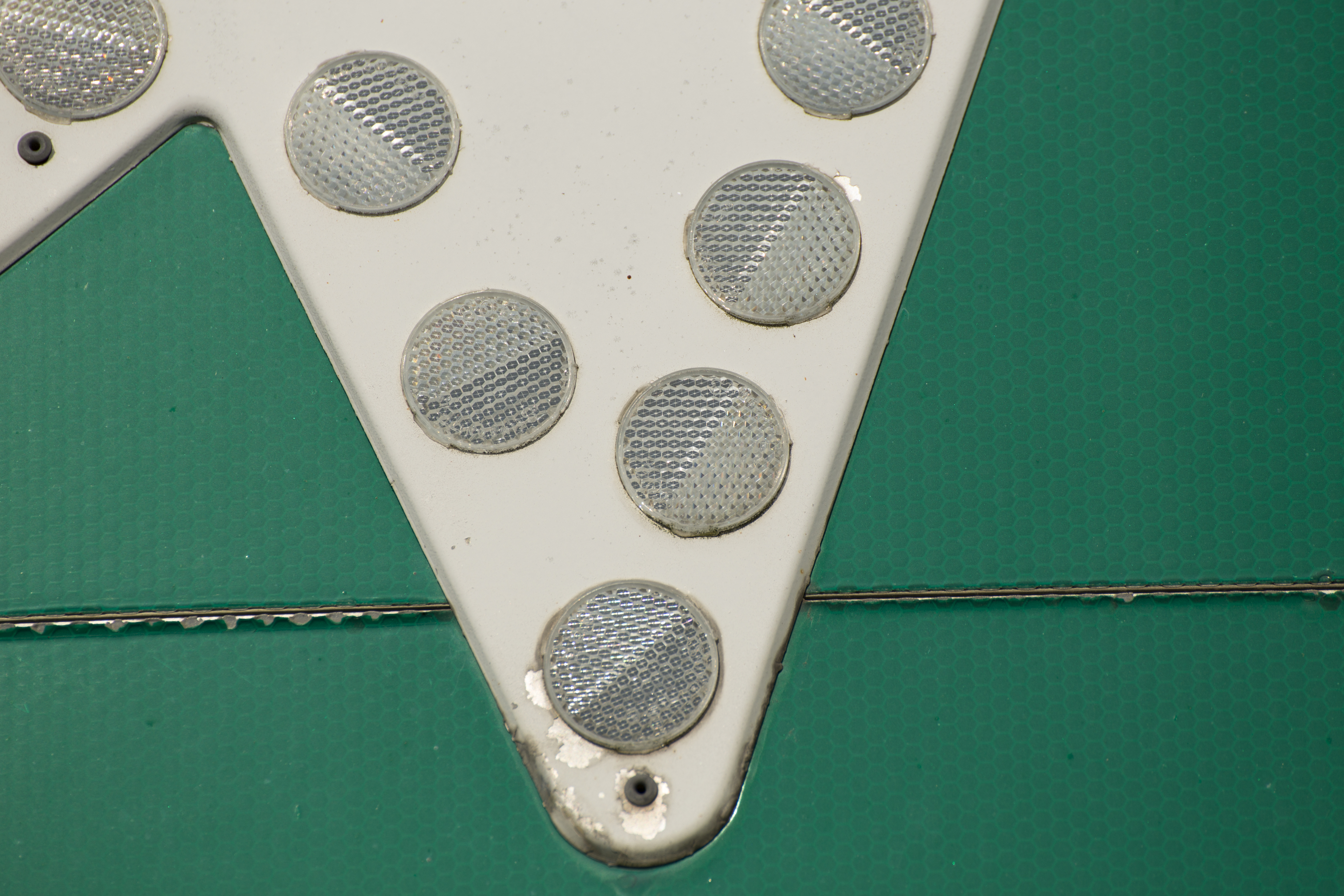
Button copy on a letter "X" and an extreme close up of an arrow, from an exit sign in Ohio.
The silver colored circles are retroreflective; the white shapes and letters are not.

Button copy is a type of physical design for road signs in the United States. Round plastic retroreflective buttons made of transparent plastic are placed in rows following the contours of sign legend elements, usually painted white, such as letters, numbers, arrows, and borders. In daylight, the buttons visually blend with the white sign legend elements and so are minimally conspicuous. At night, light from each approaching vehicle's headlamps strikes the retroreflective buttons and is reflected back towards the eyes of the vehicle's driver. Thus, the sign is made sufficiently conspicuous and legible for adequately fast and accurate recognition and interpretation by drivers.

Button copy has been supplanted by a newer technology: retroreflective sheeting made by various manufacturers in numerous colors and grades. As state departments of transportation increasingly stopped specifying button copy signs in favor of signs made with sheeting, it became uneconomical to maintain production of the materials and supplies for making button copy signs. The last state to specify button copy signs was Arizona, which switched to sheeting in 2000.

The advantage of button copy is durability, in that a well-made button copy sign has a service life of around 40 years. In contrast, signs made out of retroreflective sheeting are expected to last only around 15 years. However, at night, retroreflective sheeting is clearly visible and readable at much longer distances than button copy.

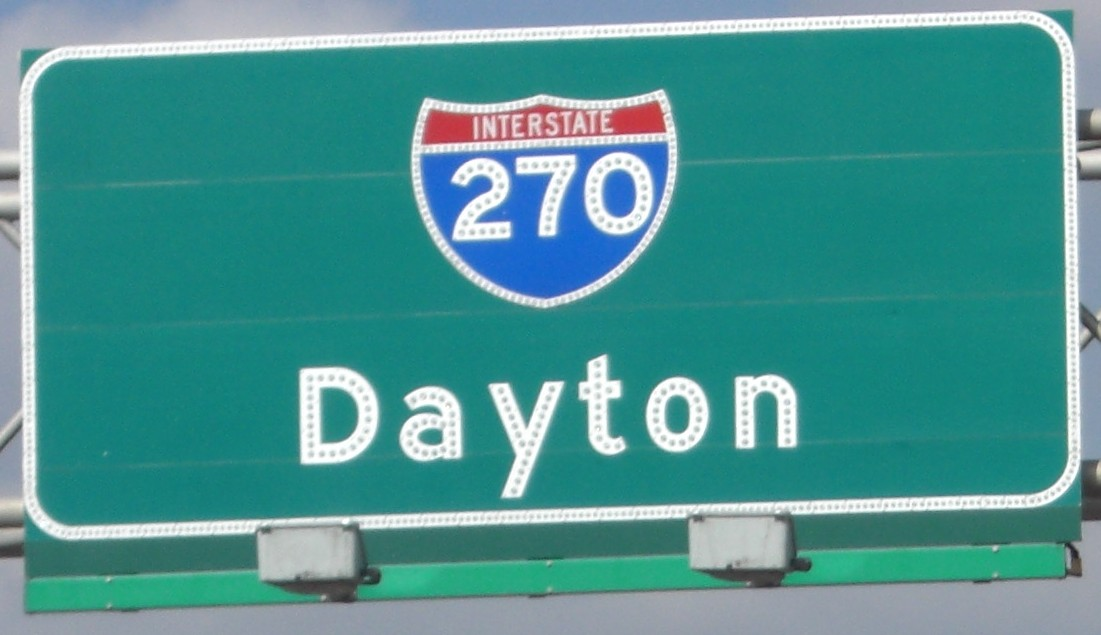
Button copy overhead sign on I-270 in Ohio, including button copy shield outline and numerals

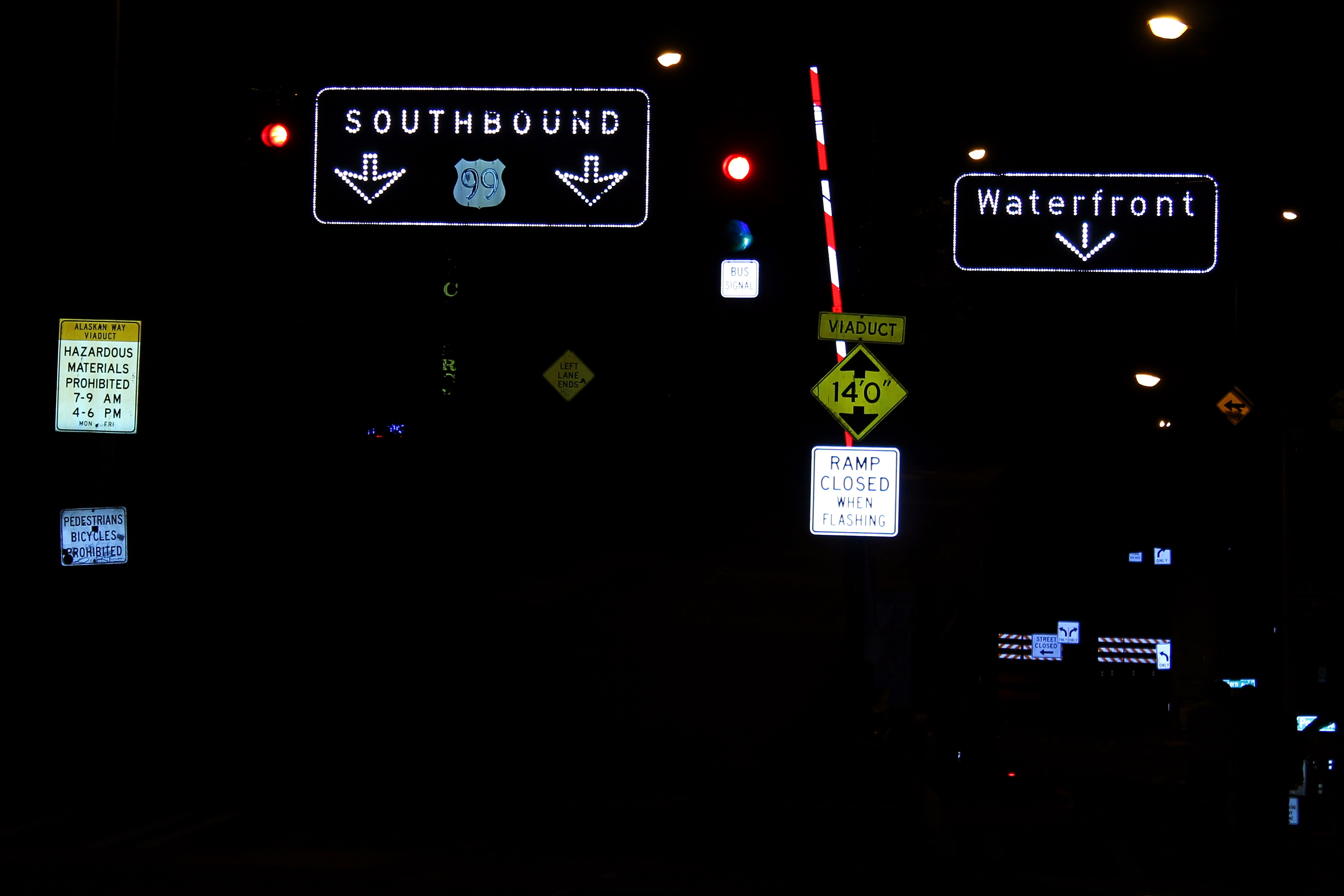
Button copy on overhead guide signs in Washington, showing the reflection of button reflectors in camera flash

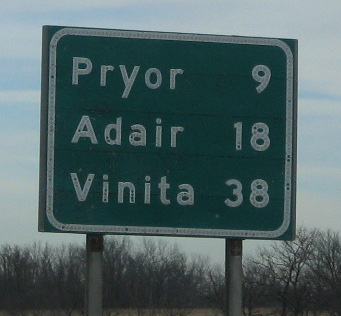
A highway distance sign in Oklahoma using button copy

== See also ==
- Demountable copy, another sign manufacturing technology
