= Bike crossing =

Bike crossing may refer to:

- Cyclist crossing, a marked crossing for cyclists.
- Bicycle-sharing system, a service in which bicycles are made available for shared use to individuals who do not own them
- A road crossing for bikeways in their own rights-of-way
- Cyclo-cross racing
