= Pittsburgh left =

Driving practice

The Pittsburgh left is a colloquial term for the practice of oncoming traffic yielding to the first driver at an intersection who is turning left even though the driver turning left is the one required to yield. Before opposing vehicles going straight advance; the straight-driving vehicles may signal their yield by flashing their headlights or with a wave. This behavior is associated with the Pittsburgh, Pennsylvania, area and came into vogue because of its hilly terrain combined with the preponderance of two-lane roads. It is an illegal and controversial practice.

The maneuver has been referred to as a Boston left or New York left, but those maneuvers may refer to when the left-turning driver rushes to turn left before the straight-driving driver can advance, regardless of whether the straight-driving driver yields or not.

== Legality ==
The Pittsburgh left has no basis in law. Failing to yield to oncoming traffic while navigating a turn is a traffic violation, and is prohibited in the Commonwealth of Pennsylvania. In Ontario, Canada, such a turn is considered stunt driving under the provincial Highway Traffic Act.

== See also ==
- Pittsburgh parking chair
- Michigan left
