= Retroreflective sheeting =

Reflective material

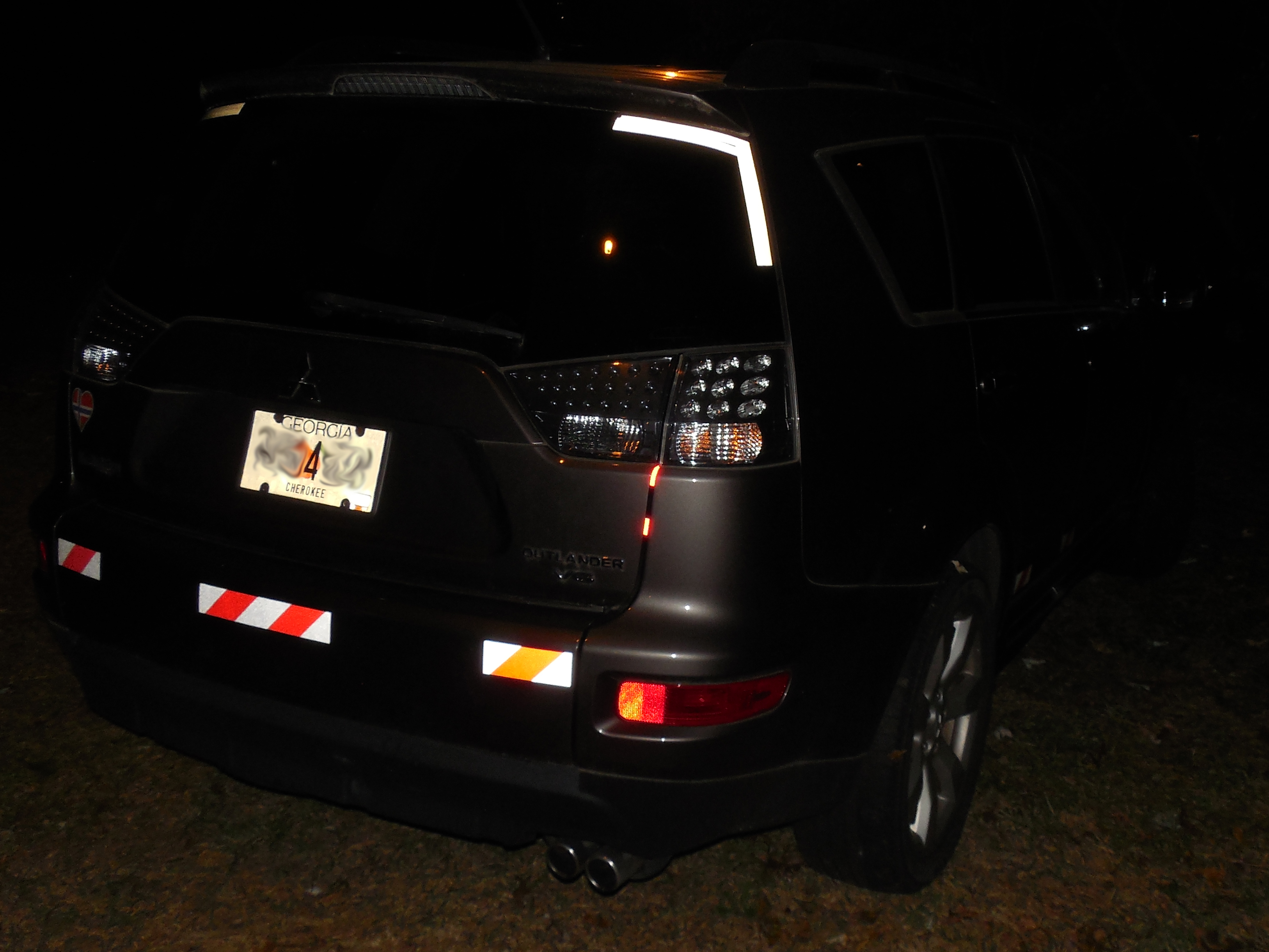
Flash photo of car with reflective stickers

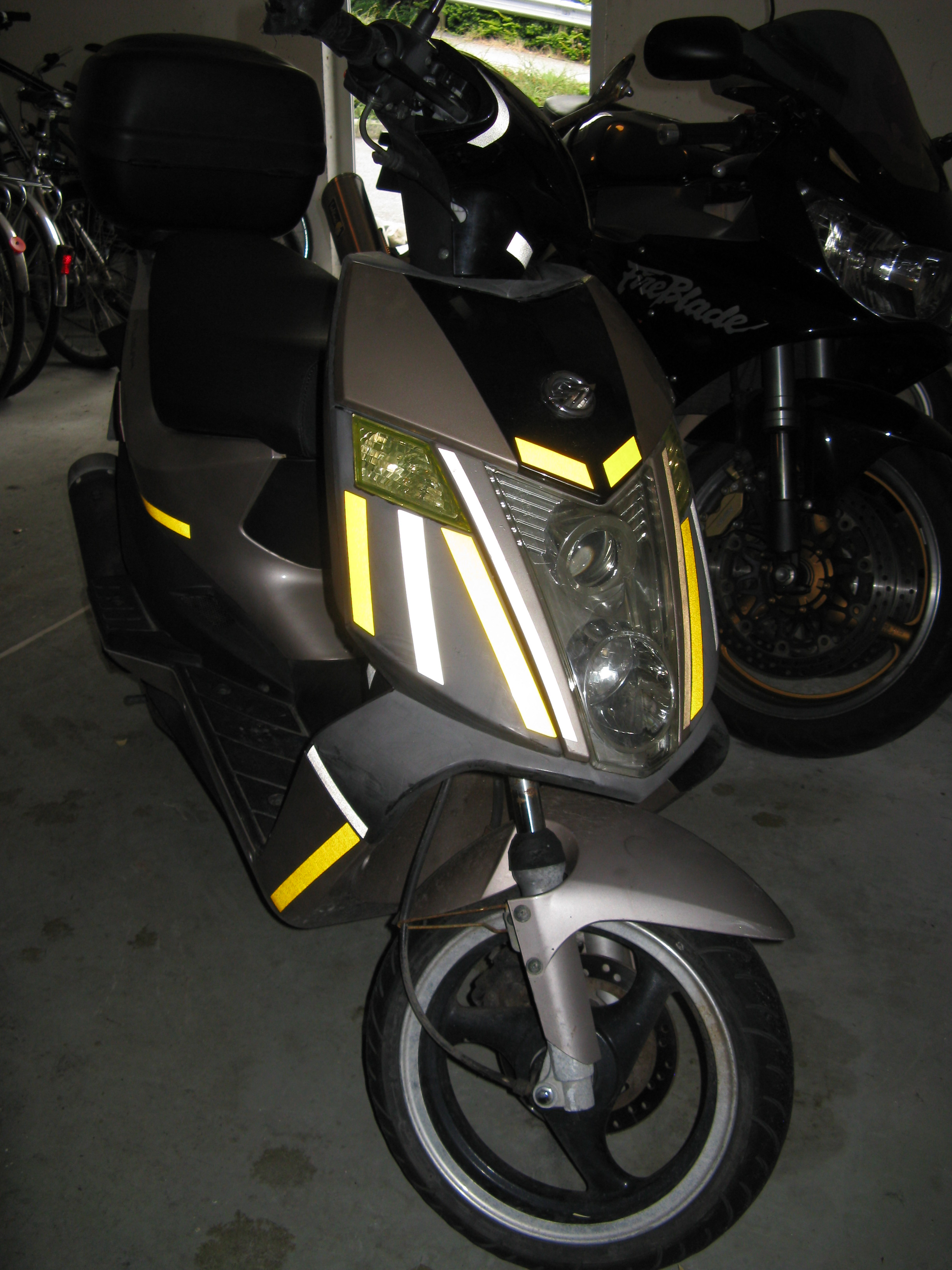
Flash photo of moped with retroreflective sheeting tape

Retroreflective sheeting is flexible retroreflective material primarily used to increase the nighttime conspicuity of traffic signs, high-visibility clothing, and other items so they are safely and effectively visible in the light of an approaching driver's headlamps. They are also used as a material to increase the scanning range of barcodes in factory settings. The sheeting consists of retroreflective glass beads, microprisms, or encapsulated lenses sealed onto a fabric or plastic substrate. Many different colors and degrees of reflection intensity are provided by numerous manufacturers for various applications. As with any retroreflector, sheeting glows brightly when there is a small angle between the observer's eye and the light source directed toward the sheeting but appears nonreflective when viewed from other directions.

== Applications ==
Retroreflective sheeting is widely used in a variety of applications today, after early widespread use on road signs in the 1960s.

=== High-visibility clothing ===
High-visibility clothing frequently combines retroreflective sheeting with fluorescent fabrics in order to significantly increase the wearer's visibility from a distance, which in turn reduces the risk of traffic-related accidents. Such clothing is commonly worn as (often mandatory) PPE by professionals who work near road traffic or heavy machinery, often at night or in low-visibility weather conditions, such as construction workers, road workers and emergency service personnel. It is also commonly worn by cyclists or joggers to increase their nighttime visibility to road traffic. High-visibility clothing typically come in fluorescent colors like yellow, orange, and red, as these shades are highly visible in various lighting conditions and are internationally recognized for safety use. It designed according to specific standards to ensure effectiveness. In Canada, these requirements are outlined in the CSA Standard Z96-15 (R2020), while in the United States, they follow the ANSI/ISEA 107-2020.

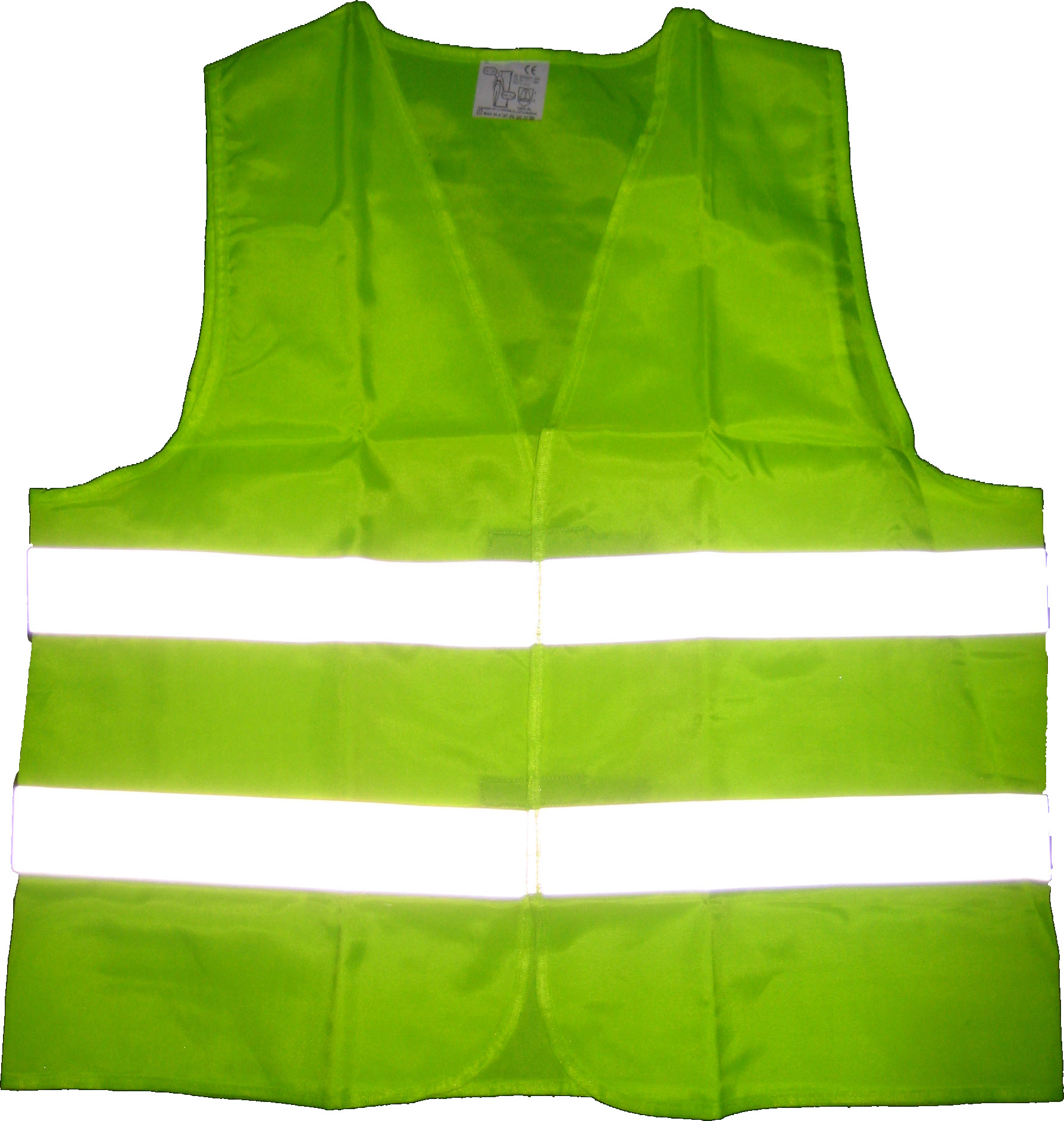
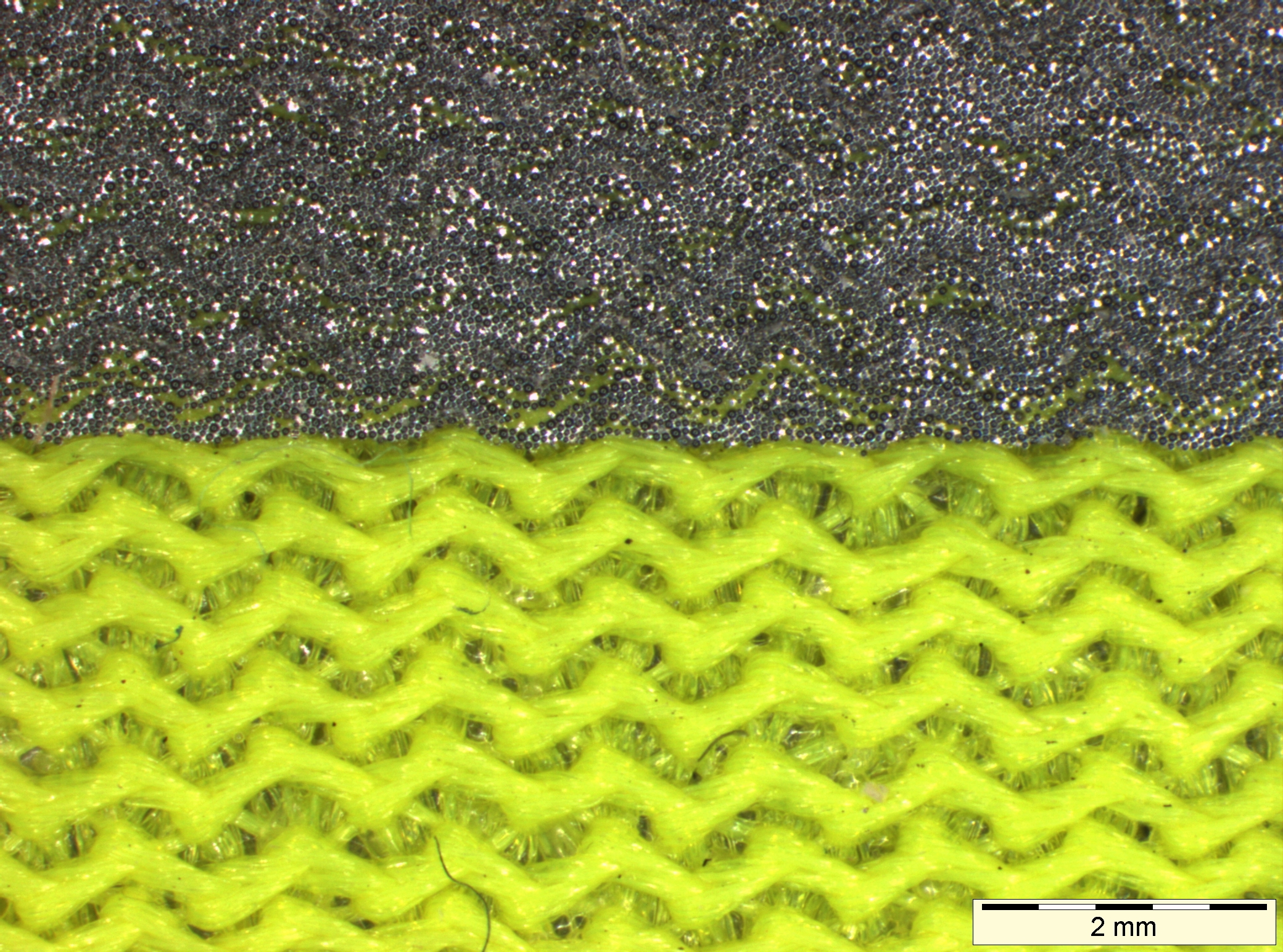
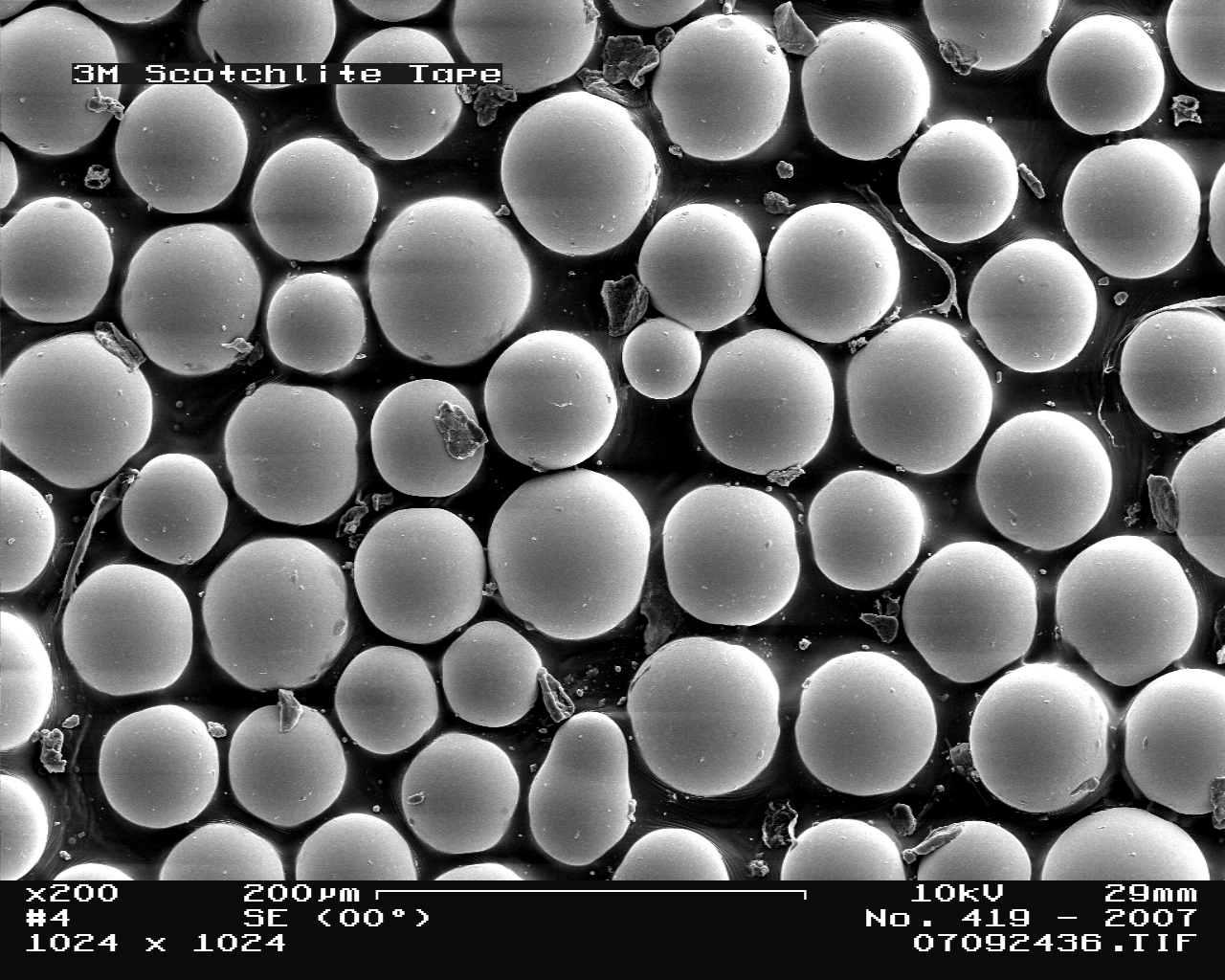
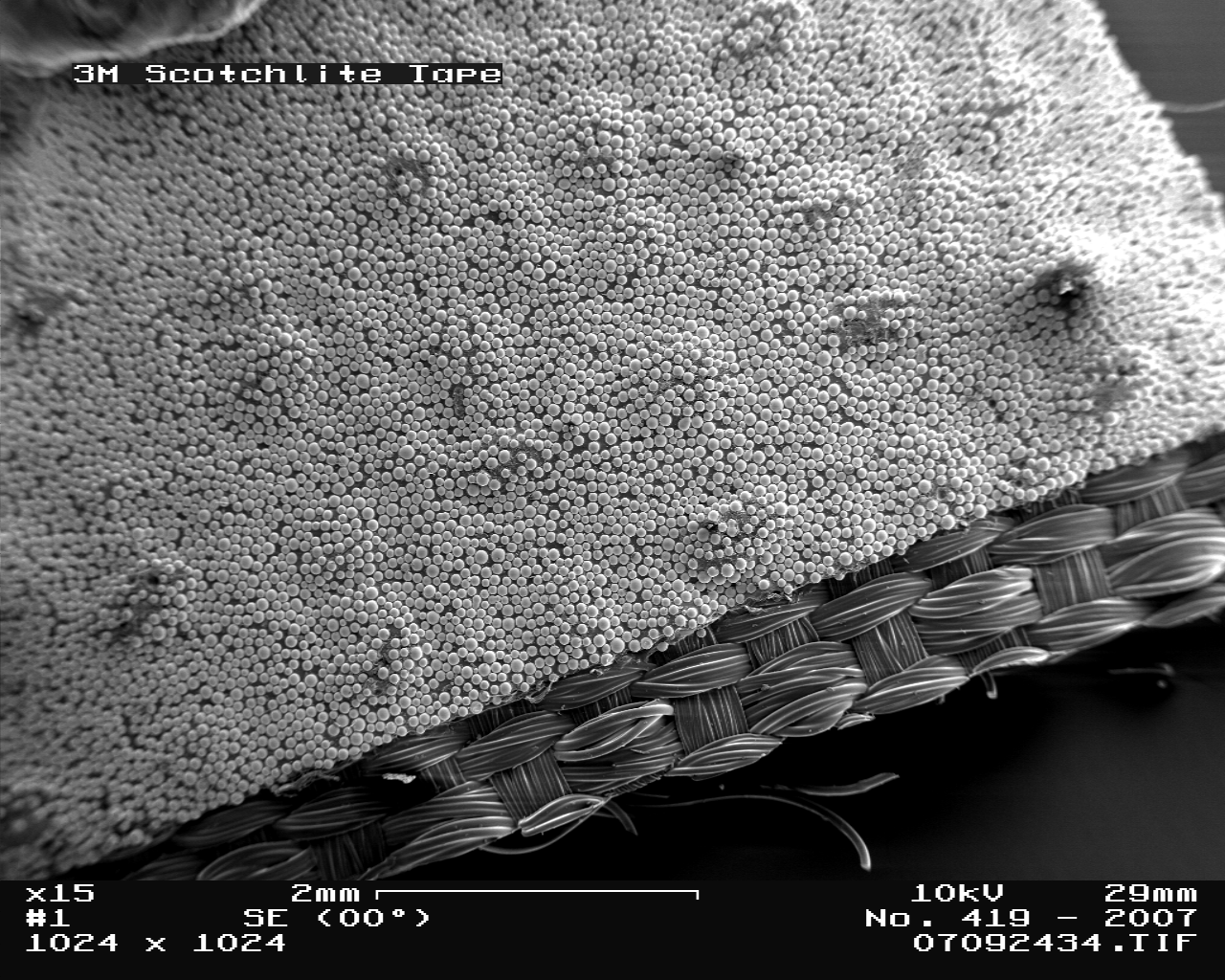
Retroreflective sheeting on high-visibility clothing at varying magnification levels. Clockwise from top left: Yellow safety vest; Retroreflective strip, magnified 8x; Magnified 15x using a scanning electron microscope (SEM); Magnified 200x with SEM.

=== For road signs ===
Retroreflective sheeting for road signs is categorized by construction and performance specified by technical standards such as ASTM D4956-11a.; various types give differing levels of retroreflection, effective view angles, and lifespan. Sheeting has replaced button copy as the predominant type of retroreflector used in roadway signs.

There are several grades of retroreflective sheeting which include the three major grades: engineer grade, high intensity prismatic (HIP) and diamond grade. Within these categories are further delineations based on material used and visibility distance. Diamond grade typically has the greatest distance for visibility of the three major categories.

=== For barcode labels ===
Barcodes can be printed onto retroreflective sheeting to enable scanning up to 50 feet away.

=== In motion pictures ===
The special effects technique of front projection uses retroreflective screens to create false backgrounds for scenes shot in studios. Front projection was used in 2001: A Space Odyssey during the "Dawn of Man" sequence. Other films that have used front projection techniques include Silent Running, Where Eagles Dare and Superman.

Star Wars episodes IV, V and VI used retroreflective sheeting for the lightsaber blades.

=== Autonomous vehicle navigation ===
Reflective tape is used to provide an explicit way to do optical navigation of autonomous vehicles. For example, strips of retroreflective tape are used to provide navigation inputs to the prototype Hyperloop pod vehicles on the SpaceX Hypertube test track.
