= Traffic light =

Signaling device to control competing flows of traffic

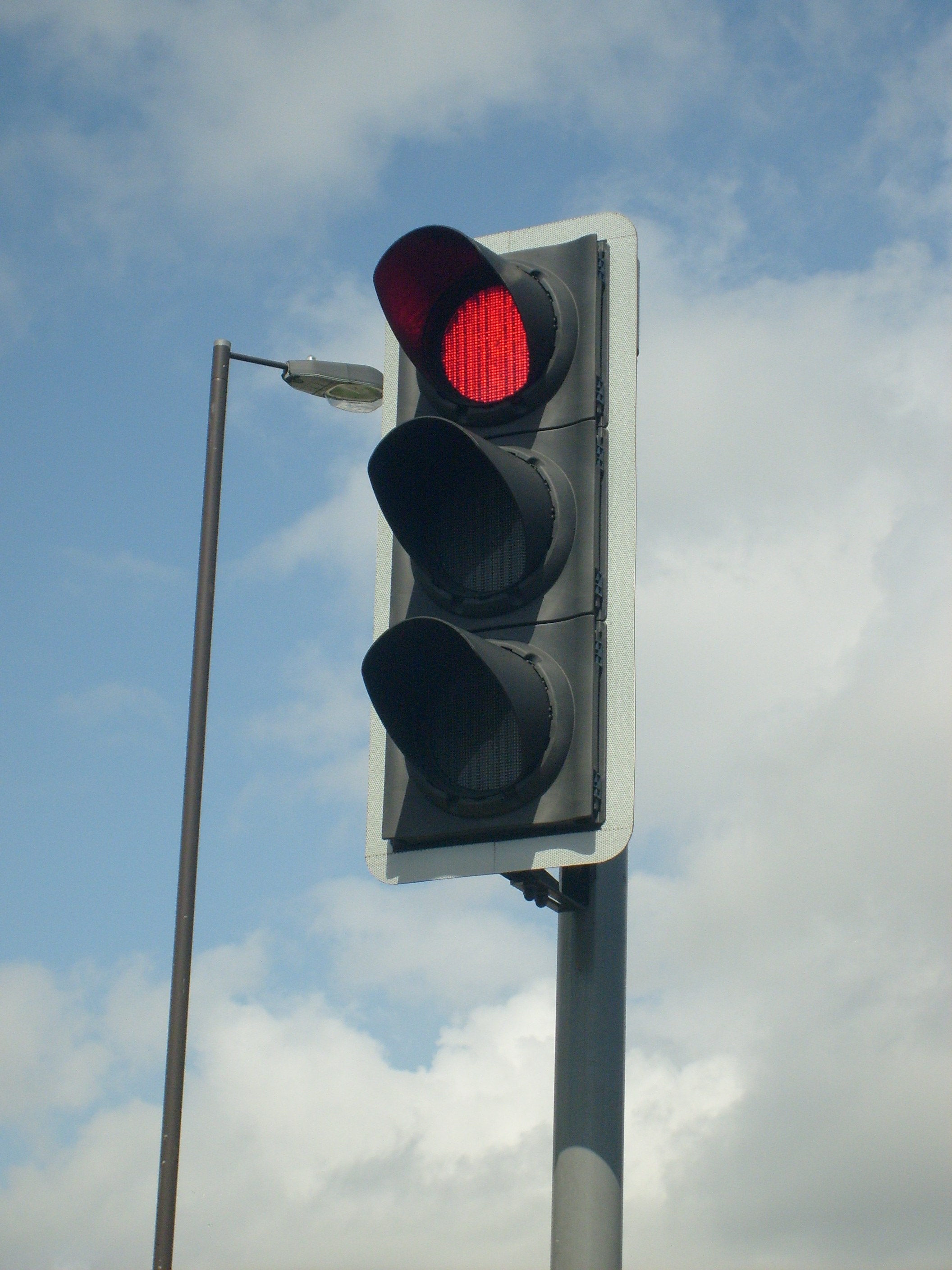
An LED 50-watt traffic light in Portsmouth, United Kingdom

Traffic lights, traffic signals, or stoplights – also known as robots in South Africa, Zambia, and Namibia – are signaling devices positioned at road intersections, pedestrian crossings, and other locations to control the flow of traffic.

Traffic lights usually consist of three signals, conveying meaningful information to road users through colors and symbols, including arrows and bicycle symbols. The usual traffic light colors are red to stop traffic, amber to signal a change, and green to allow traffic to proceed. These are arranged vertically or horizontally in that order. Although this is internationally standardized, variations in traffic light sequences and laws exist on national and local scales.

Traffic lights were first introduced in December 1868 on Parliament Square in London to reduce the need for police officers to control traffic. Since then, electricity and computerized control have advanced traffic light technology and increased intersection capacity. The system is also used for other purposes, including the control of pedestrian movements, variable lane control (such as tidal flow systems or smart motorways), and railway level crossings.

== History ==
In December 1868, the first traffic signals showing a red or green light at night were installed outside the Houses of Parliament in London. They were invented by John Peake Knight. A police constable raised or lowered the semaphore arms and, at night, operated a lever to control the lights which drivers and pedestrians saw. This system exploded on 2 January 1869 and was taken down. This early traffic signal led to other parts of the world implementing similar traffic signal systems. In the first two decades of the 20th century, semaphore traffic signals like the one in London were in use all over the United States. These traffic signals were controlled by a traffic officer who adjusted the signals to direct traffic.

In 1912, the first electric traffic light was developed by Lester Wire, a policeman in Salt Lake City, Utah. In August 1914, the American Traffic Signal Company installed it on the corner of East 105th Street and Euclid Avenue in Cleveland, Ohio. In 1920, the first four-way, three-color traffic light was created by William Potts in Detroit, Michigan. His design was the first to include an amber 'caution' light along with red and green lights. Potts was Superintendent of Signals for the Police Department of Detroit. In 1921, he installed automatic four-way, three-color traffic lights in 15 towers across Detroit.

By 1922, traffic towers were being controlled by automatic timers more widely. The main advantage of using the timer was that it saved cities money by replacing traffic officers. New York City was able to reassign all but 500 of its 6,000 officers working on the traffic squad, saving the city $12,500,000. In 1923, Garrett Morgan patented a design of a manually operated three-way traffic light with moving arms.

The control of traffic lights changed with the rise of computers in America in the 1950s. One of the best historical examples of computerized control of lights was in Denver, Colorado, in 1952. In 1967, Toronto, Canada, was the first to use more advanced computers better suited to vehicle detection. The computers maintained control over 159 signals in Toronto through telephone lines.

== Vehicular signals ==
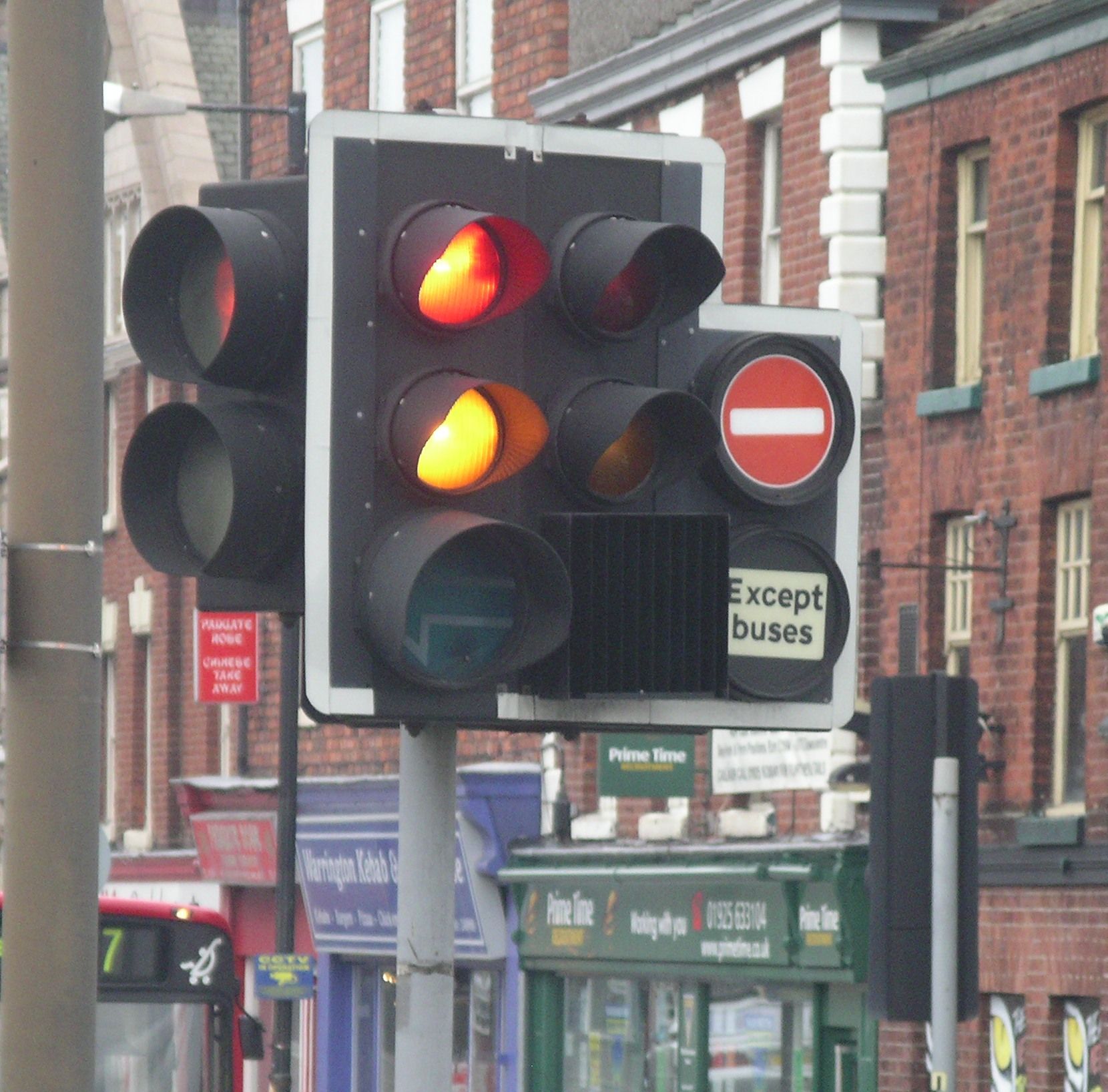
Traffic lights can have several additional lights for filter turns or bus lanes.

Road crossing of A970 with Sumburgh Airport's runway in Shetland. The movable barrier closes when an aircraft lands or takes off.

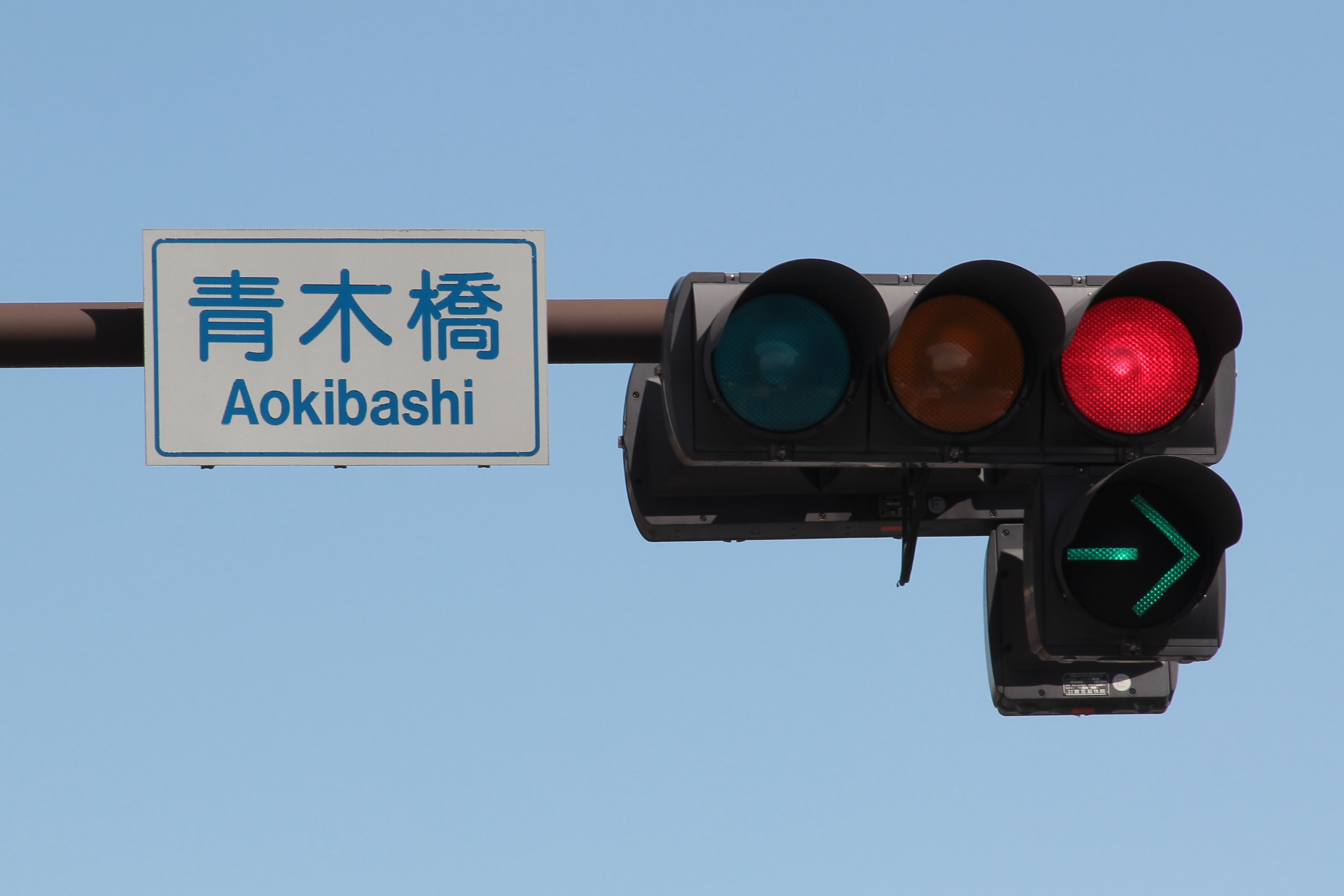
Horizontally-mounted signals in Japan

A set of lights, known as a signal head, may have one, two, three, or more aspects. The most common signal type has three aspects facing the oncoming traffic: red on top, amber ("yellow" in North America, "orange" in Australia) below, and green below that. Additional aspects may be fitted to the signal, usually to indicate specific restrictions or filter movements.

=== Meanings of signals ===
The 1968 Vienna Convention on Road Signs and Signals Chapter III provides international standards for the setup of traffic signal operations. Not all states have ratified the convention. A three-color signal head should have three non-flashing red, amber, and green lights. They should be arranged either vertically, with red on top, or horizontally, with red opposite the traffic flow. (Note: In regions where traffic drives on the right (right-hand traffic), the red light should be on the left side of a horizontal traffic signal, and vice versa for left-hand traffic.) A two-color signal head may be used in temporary operation and consists of red and green non-flashing lights. In both cases, all lights should be circular or arrow-shaped. Permissible signals for regulating vehicle traffic (other than public transport vehicles) are outlined in Article 23:

Standard meanings for traffic lights internationally (Vienna Convention, Article 23)
| Light type | | Meaning |
|---|---|---|
| Non-flashing | Red | Traffic may not proceed beyond the stop line, or otherwise enter the intersection. |
| Non-flashing | Red/Amber | The signal is about to change, but the red light rule continues to apply. |
| Non-flashing | Amber | Traffic may not pass the stop line or enter the intersection, unless it cannot safely stop when the light shows. |
| Non-flashing | Green | Traffic may proceed, unless it would not clear the intersection before the next change of phase. |
| Flashing | Red | Traffic must not pass the stop line at a level crossing, approach to swing bridge or ferry landing stages, emergency vehicles entering the road, or on the approach to low-flying aircraft. In addition, to attract attention in these locations, it is also equipped with additional alarms and voice prompts. |
| Flashing | Amber | Traffic may proceed, but with caution. |

Green arrows are added to signals to indicate that traffic can proceed in a particular direction while the main lights for that approach are red, or that traffic can only proceed in one particular direction. Alternatively, when combined with another green signal, they may indicate that turning traffic has priority over oncoming traffic (known as a "filter arrow"). Flashing amber arrows typically indicate that road users must give way (to other drivers and pedestrians) before moving in the direction of the arrow. These are used because they are safer, cause less delay, and are more flexible. Flashing amber arrows will normally be located below the solid amber.

==== Green arrows ====
Arrow aspects may be used to permit certain movements or convey other messages to road users. A green arrow may display to require drivers to turn in a particular direction only or to allow drivers to continue in a particular direction when the signal is red. Generally, a green phase is illuminated at the beginning of the green phase (a "leading turn") or at the end of the green phase (a "lagging turn"). An 'indicative arrow' may be displayed alongside a green light. This indicates to drivers that oncoming traffic is stopped, so they do not need to give way to it when turning across it. As right-turning traffic (left-side drive) or left-turning traffic (right-side drive) does not normally have priority, this arrow is used to allow turning traffic to clear before the next phase begins.

Some variations of this setup exist. One version is a horizontal bar with five lights – the green and amber arrows are located between the standard green and amber lights. A vertical five-light bar holds the arrows underneath the standard green light. In this arrangement, the amber arrow is sometimes omitted, leaving only the green arrow below the steady green light, or possibly an LED-based device capable of showing both green and amber arrows within a single lamp housing.

A third type is known as a "doghouse" or "cluster head" – a vertical column with the two normal lights is on the right side of the signal, a vertical column with the two arrows is located on the left, and the normal red signal is in the middle above the two columns. Cluster signals in Australia and New Zealand use six signals, the sixth being a red arrow that can operate separately from the standard red light.

In a fourth type, sometimes seen at intersections in Ontario and Quebec, Canada, there is no dedicated left-turn lamp per se. Instead, the normal green lamp flashes rapidly, indicating permission to go straight as well as make a left turn in front of opposing traffic, which is being held by a steady red lamp. This "advance green", or flashing green, can be somewhat startling and confusing to drivers not familiar with this system. This can confuse visitors to British Columbia, where a flashing green signal denotes a pedestrian-controlled crosswalk. For this reason, Ontario is phasing out the use of flashing green signals and instead replacing them with arrows.

==== Countdown lights ====
Popular in Vietnam and China, countdown lights are additional lights installed adjacent to or within the main signal lights. The countdown light is displayed by a countdown number with different colors, usually red, yellow, and green, matching the color of the light on. When the light counts to "0" (or 1), the main light color immediately changes.

Countdown lights may have zeros in the tens place or none; some may flash when getting ready to zero. Yellow lights can have countdown lights, but the most lights do not. Usually the countdown light has 2 digits, in case the time of the main light (usually the red light, rarely the green light) is longer than 100 seconds, depending on the type of light, the following possibilities may occur:

- The lights have not counted down, when 99 seconds are left, start counting. During standby, the light may display "99", "00", "--", or be off.
- The last two digits count light of the timeout (the counter light is 15 while the time is 115 seconds, some types of lights count as "-9" or "9-" when the time is 109 seconds)
- The tens digit on the display becomes a letter. Displaying A0 for 100 seconds, B0 for 110 seconds, so forth.
- Display of only the last two digits, with a flashing indicator to show it is more than 100.

A countdown light

Countdown lights are also used for both vehicular and pedestrian signals in the Philippines. However, since 2025, the use of countdown timers has been phased out in Metro Manila by the Metropolitan Manila Development Authority in favor of a volume-based traffic signaling system. As a result, instead of a countdown timer to the next phase, green signals will blink five times before turning yellow.

==== Issue about the yellow light dilemma zone in South Korea ====
In South Korea, the yellow (amber) light dilemma zone is not legally recognized. In other words, when the amber light is on, traffic may not pass the stop line or enter the intersection, even if the traffic cannot safely stop when the light shows.

In May 2024, this was reaffirmed by the Supreme Court of Korea, for a case where the driver was speeding at 62 km/h in a street limited up to 40 km/h, 55% higher than the allowed speed.

Critics in South Korea say this is unrealistic and unreasonable. This can cause multiple collisions due to sudden braking.

In 2016, when the speed limit was up to 60 km/h, proposed alternatives to this type of collision included only roundabouts, increased speed compliance, and reduced-speed practice; elderly zones were also proposed as solutions.

=== Yellow trap ===
Without an all-red phase, cross-turning traffic may be caught in a 'yellow trap'. When the signal turns yellow (amber), a turning driver may assume oncoming traffic will stop, and a crash may result. For this reason, the US bans sequences that may cause a yellow trap. This can also happen when emergency vehicles or railroads preempt normal signal operation. In the United States, signs reading "Oncoming traffic has extended green" or "Oncoming traffic may have extended green" must be posted at intersections where the "yellow trap" condition exists.

=== Variations ===
==== United States ====
The United States is not party to the Vienna Convention; rather, the Manual on Uniform Traffic Control Devices (MUTCD) outlines correct operation in that country. In the US, a single signal head may have three, four, or five aspects. A single-aspect green arrow may be displayed to indicate continuous movement. The signals must be arranged in red, amber, and green, either vertically (top to bottom) or horizontally (left to right). In the US, a single-aspect flashing amber signal can be used to raise attention to a warning sign, and a single-aspect flashing red signal can be used to raise attention to a "stop", "do not enter", or "wrong way" sign. Flashing red or amber lights, known as intersection control beacons, are used to reinforce stop signs at intersections. The MUTCD specifies the following vehicular signals:

Standard meanings for traffic lights in the United States (MUTCD, Chapter 4)
| Signal | Meaning (steady) | Meaning (flashing) |
|---|---|---|
| Circular green | Traffic can proceed in any permitted direction, yielding to pedestrians in a crosswalk or other vehicles when turning | Not to be used |
| Green arrow | Traffic can proceed in the direction shown by the arrow, yielding to any pedestrians in a crosswalk or other vehicles in the intersection | Not to be used |
| Circular yellow | The green movement is being terminated, and a red signal will soon be displayed | Traffic can cautiously enter the intersection, yielding to pedestrians and other vehicles |
| Yellow arrow | The green or flashing arrow movement is being terminated | Traffic can cautiously enter the intersection to make the movement displayed by the arrow, yielding to pedestrians and other vehicles |
| Circular red | Unless another signal permits, traffic shall not enter the intersection except to lawfully turn on red | Traffic must stop before entering the intersection, but may then treat the signal by the same rules as a STOP sign. |
| Red arrow | Traffic shall not make the movement displayed by the arrow | Traffic must stop before entering the intersection, but may then treat the signal by the same rules as a stop sign to make the movement displayed by the arrow. |

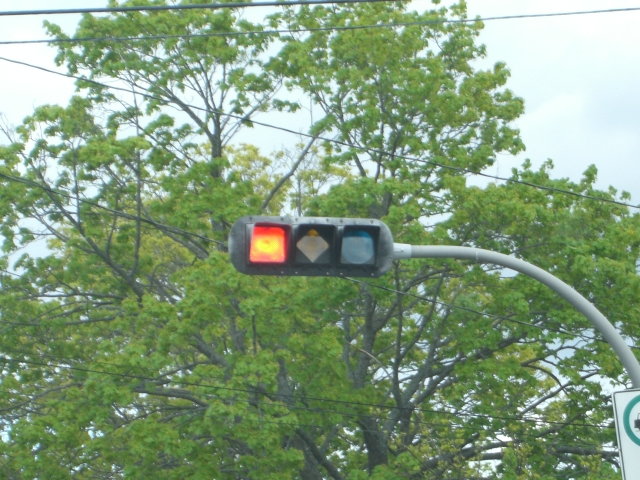
A traffic signal in Halifax, Nova Scotia, with specially shaped lights to assist people with color blindness

==== Canada ====
The Transportation Association of Canada (TAC) publishes the Manual of Uniform Traffic Control Devices for Canada, which establishes the baseline for traffic signals and signage across Canada.

However, traffic laws and transportation engineering standards are set at the provincial level and there are several notable differences between provinces.

For example, British Columbia uses flashing green balls to indicate that a pedestrian-controlled signal dwells on green until a pedestrian activates the pushbutton. In Ontario, a flashing green ball indicates a protected left turn phase. Other provinces use green arrows to indicate protected left turn phases.

In the Canadian province of Quebec and the Maritime provinces, lights are often arranged horizontally, with some signals having aspects in different shapes: red is a square, usually in pairs at either end of the fixture, amber is a diamond, and green is a circle.

==== Japan ====
Japanese traffic signals mostly follow the same rule except that the green "go" signals are referred to as 青 (ao), typically translated as "blue", reflecting a historical change in the Japanese language. As a result, Japanese officials decreed in 1973 that the "go" light should be changed to the bluest possible shade of green, bringing the name more in line with the color without violating the international "green means go" rule.

==== United Kingdom ====
In the UK, normal traffic lights follow this sequence:

- Red – Stop, do not proceed.
- Red and amber – Get ready to proceed, but do not proceed yet.
- Green – Proceed if the intersection or crossing is clear; vehicles are not allowed to block the intersection or crossing.
- Amber – Stop, unless it is unsafe to do so.

A speed sign is a special traffic light, variable traffic sign, or variable-message sign giving drivers a recommended speed to approach the next traffic light in its green phase and avoid a stop due to reaching the intersection when lights are red. (Note: Not completely correct: a variable speed sign is not solely used for the purpose of slowing the speed of motorists approaching an intersection. They are also used on freeways where the maximum safe speed is dependent on the conditions of the roadway (i.e., weather, falling rocks, risk of wildlife, etc.), such as in British Columbia, Canada.)

== Pedestrian signals ==
Pedestrian signals are used to inform pedestrians when to cross a road. Most pedestrian signal heads will have two lights: a 'walk' light (normally a walking human figure, typically colored green or white) and a 'don't walk' light (normally either a red or orange man figure or a hand), though other variations exist.

Pedestrian sequences in various countries
| Country/ies | Sequence | Notes |
|---|---|---|
| Australia, New Zealand, Philippines | Green man: safe to cross Flashing red man: do not start to cross; if it appears during crossing, then continue to cross if unable to stop safely Red man: do not cross | Several intersections in Wellington, New Zealand, have alternative green man figures. Eight intersections near Parliament Buildings have silhouettes of suffragette Kate Sheppard, while four intersections along Cuba Street have silhouettes of drag performer and LGBT rights activist Carmen Rupe. |
| China | Green: safe to cross Red: do not cross Amber (steady, after green, before red): continue to cross only if unable to stop safely Flashing amber: cross with caution (often used in low-traffic crossings or after midnight) | |
| Japan | Blue or green man: safe to cross (cyclists may cross or turn left) Flashing blue or green man: do not start to cross; if it appears during crossing, then continue to cross if unable to stop safely Red standing man: do not cross | |
| Germany, Czechia, Central Europe | Green: safe to cross Amber: continue to cross only if unable to stop safely Flashing amber: cross with caution, obey signage (used when lights are out of order or shut down) Red: do not cross Red and amber: do not cross, prepare for green | In Germany, Ampelmännchen pedestrian traffic signals have come to be seen as a nostalgic sign for the former German Democratic Republic. In Germany, the fine for crossing a red light if caught is as of 2019 between €5 and €10. |
| United Kingdom, Ireland, Hong Kong, Switzerland, Macao | Green walking man: safe to cross Flashing green man (at pelican crossings) or no man: do not start to cross (only at mid-block crossings); if it appears during crossing, then continue to cross if unable to stop safely Red standing man: do not cross | In the United Kingdom, there is no direct offense committed if a pedestrian fails to obey crossing signals, and many lights commonly only use two still images – a green walking person and a red standing man. This is the general case where the crossing is at a road junction, and the pedestrian signals are in combination with those controlling vehicular traffic. |
| United States, Canada, Mexico (Tijuana), Philippines (Makati, Davao) | Formerly signals used the text: WALK DONT WALK Modern version: White walking man: cross with caution Flashing orange stop hand: do not start to cross; if it appears during crossing, then continue to cross if unable to stop safely Orange stop hand: do not enter the intersection | The U.S. state of Massachusetts allows an unusual indication variation for pedestrian movement. At signalized intersections without separate pedestrian signal heads, the traffic signals may be programmed to turn red in all directions, followed by a steady display of amber lights simultaneously with the red indications. During this red-plus-amber indication, the intersection is closed to vehicular traffic and pedestrians may cross, usually in whatever direction they choose. |
| Israel | Red standing man: do not cross; if it appears during crossing, then continue to cross if unable to stop safely Green walking man: safe to cross | |
| France | Green and light, traditionally and in compliance with the international conventions. Red Man: Do Not Cross. If it appears during crossing, continue crossing if unable to stop safely. Green Man: Safe to Cross. | In 2023, a two-year experiment was allowed to start on 8 intersections, experimenting with blinking yellow lights and 7 other intersections with frozen yellow lights. |

Traffic light animation (pedestrians, cyclists and traffic) in Ljubljana, Slovenia

Where pedestrians need to cross the road between junctions, a signal-controlled crossing may be provided as an alternative to a zebra crossing or uncontrolled crossing. Traffic lights are normally used at crossings where vehicle speeds are high, where either vehicle or pedestrian flows are high, or near signalized junctions. In the UK, this type of crossing is called a pelican crossing. More modern iterations are puffin and pedex crossings. In the UK, these crossings normally need at least four traffic signals, which are of a regular type (red, amber, and green), two facing in each direction. Pedestrians are provided with push buttons and pedestrian signals, consisting of a red and green man. Farside signals are located across the crossing, while nearside signals are located below the traffic lights and face oncoming traffic.

A HAWK beacon is a special type of traffic used in the US at mid-block crossings. These consist of two red signals above a single amber signal. The beacon is unlit until a pedestrian pushes the cross button. Then an amber light will show, followed by both red lights, at which point the 'Walk' symbol will illuminate for pedestrians. At the end of the crossing phase, the 'Don't Walk' symbol will flash, as will the amber traffic light.

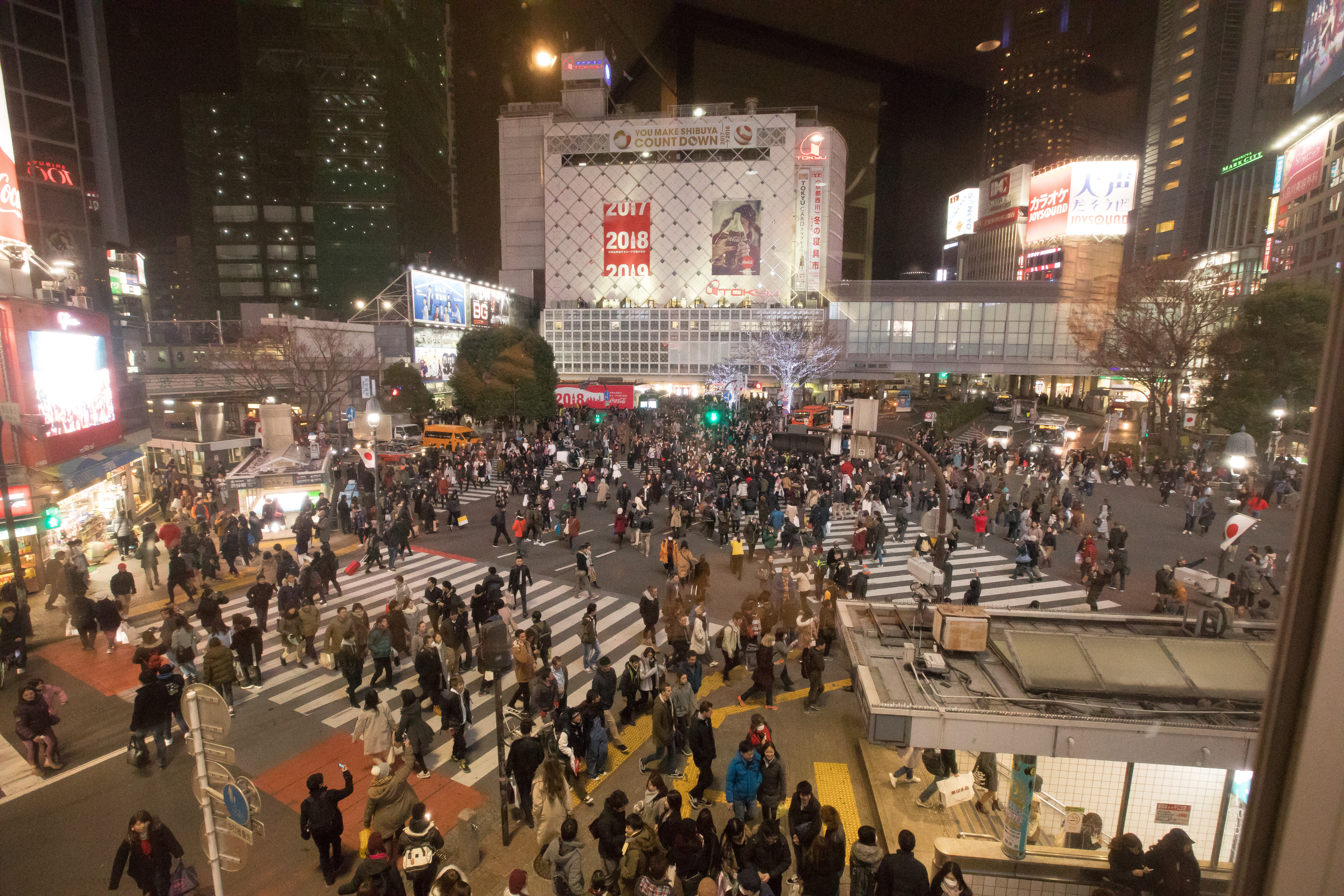
The Shibuya Crossing, in Tokyo, is a famous example of a pedestrian scramble with diagonal crossings.

Pedestrians are usually incorporated into urban signalized junctions in one of four ways: no facilities, parallel walk, walk with traffic, or all-red stages. No facilities may be provided if pedestrian demand is low, in areas where pedestrian access is not permitted, or where a subway or overpass is present. The lack of formal facilities means pedestrians will have to self-evaluate when it is safe to cross, which can be intimidating.

With a "parallel walk" design, pedestrians walk alongside the traffic flow. A leading pedestrian interval may be provided, whereby pedestrians get a "walk" signal before traffic gets a green light, allowing them to establish themselves on the crossing before vehicles begin to turn, encouraging drivers to give way.

A 'walk with traffic' facility allows pedestrians to move at the same time as other traffic movements, with no conflict between them. This can work well on one-way roads, where turning movements are banned or where the straight-ahead movement runs in a different stage from the turning movement. A splitter island could also be provided. Traffic will pass on either side of the island and pedestrians can cross the road safely between the other flows.

An all-red stage, also known as a full pedestrian stage, a pedestrian scramble, or a Barnes Dance, (Note: The Barnes Dance is named after an American traffic engineer, Henry A. Barnes. Barnes did not claim to have invented the system but was a strong advocate of it, having observed the difficulties his daughter faced crossing the road to get to school.) holds all vehicular traffic at the junction to allow pedestrians time to cross without conflict from vehicles safely. It allows diagonal crossings. This may require a longer cycle time and increase pedestrian wait periods, though the latter can be eased by providing two pedestrian stages.

A diagram of a countdown timer in the US style

Pedestrian countdown timers are becoming common at urban signal-controlled crossings. Where a pedestrian countdown is shown, it is normally used in conjunction with the flashing hand signal (in the US and Canada) or the blackout period (UK), indicating the time remaining in seconds until the end of the flashing hand or blackout. Pedestrian countdown timers do not significantly increase or reduce the number of red- and amber-light running drivers. Studies have found that pedestrian countdown timers significantly improve pedestrian compliance compared with traditional pedestrian signals; however, results are mixed.

=== Smartphone Zombie ribbon ===
As 12 to 45% of pedestrian deaths caused by 'pedestrian distraction' have been linked to cell phone usage, some cities (including Sydney, Seoul, Augsburg, Bodegraven, Tel Aviv, and Singapore) have installed LED strips embedded in the sidewalk before crosswalks to warn distracted pedestrians of imminent pedestrian crossings. This additional signal, which is synchronized with conventional signals, aims to decrease injury rates by telling distracted pedestrians when it is safe to cross the road without them having to lift their head.

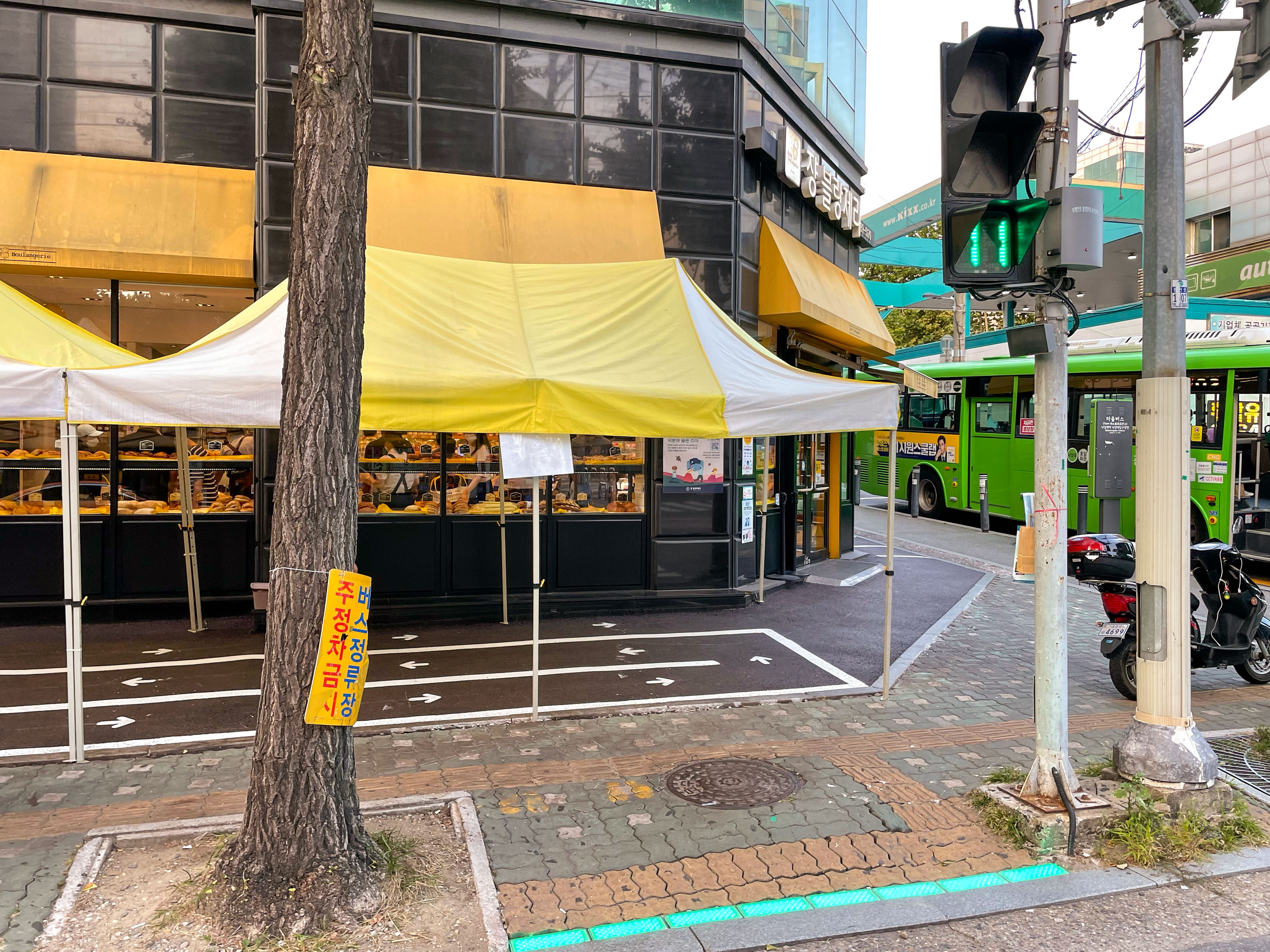
Smartphone zombie light in green

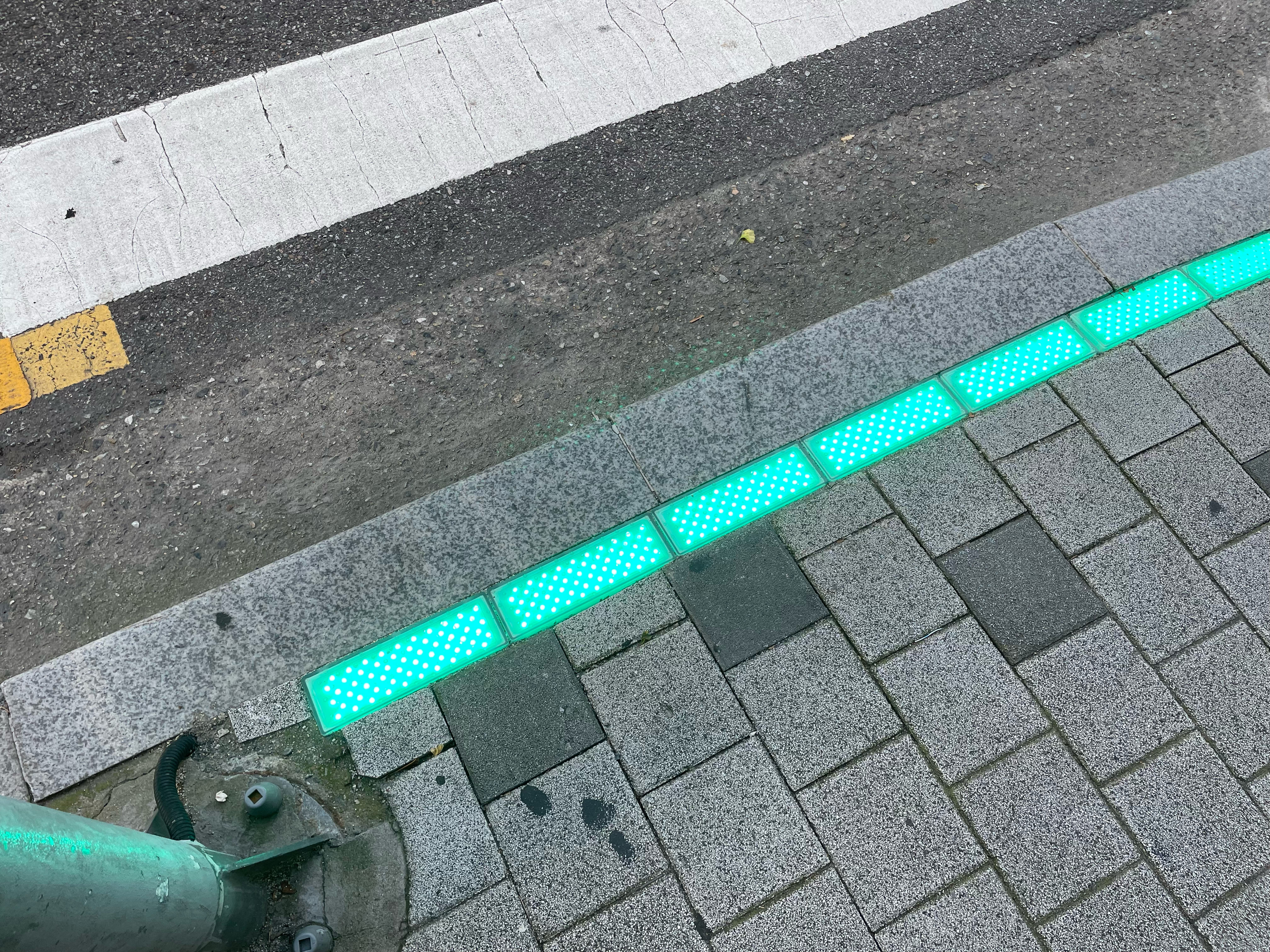
Smartphone zombie light in green, close up

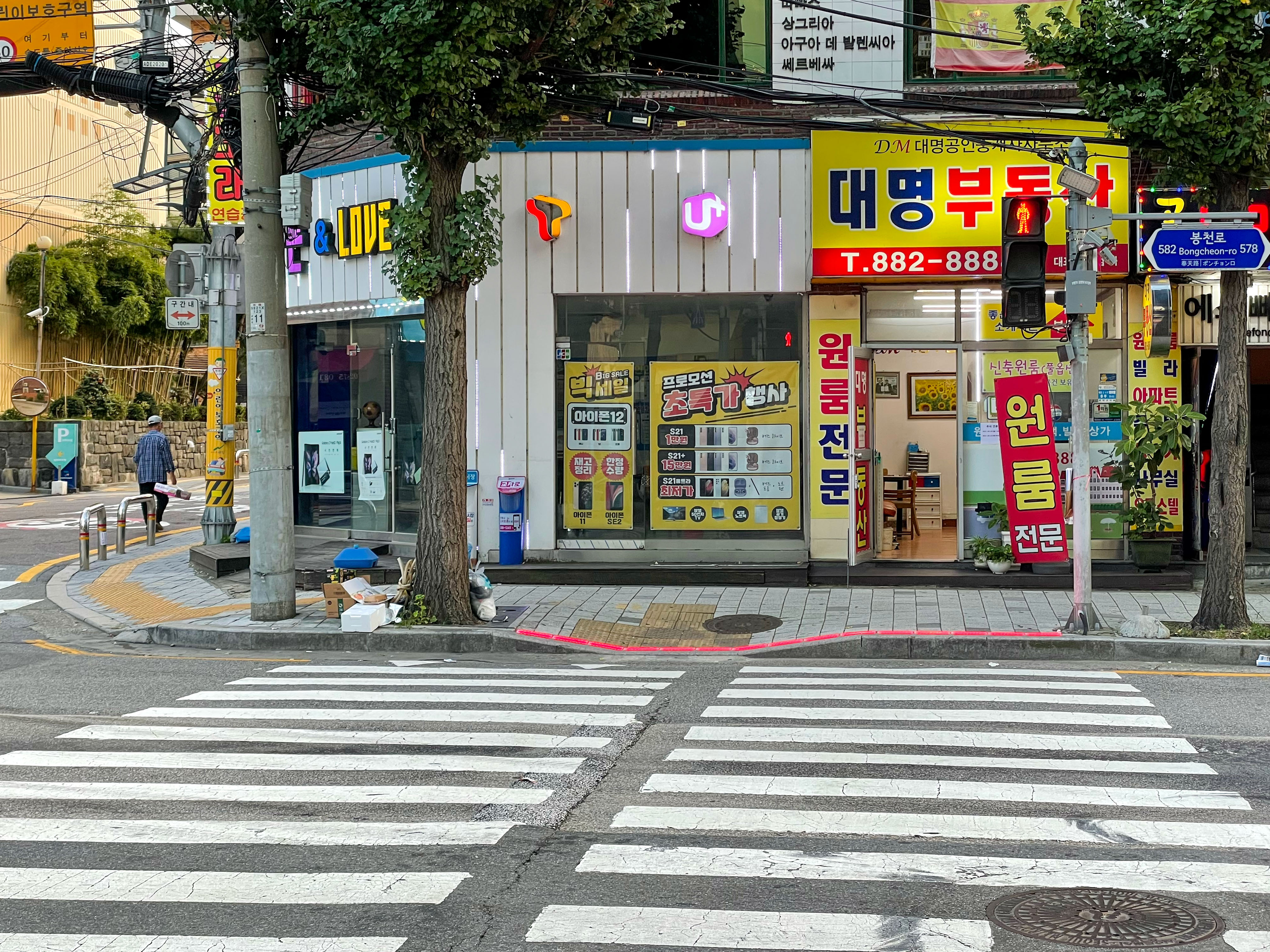
Smartphone zombie light in red

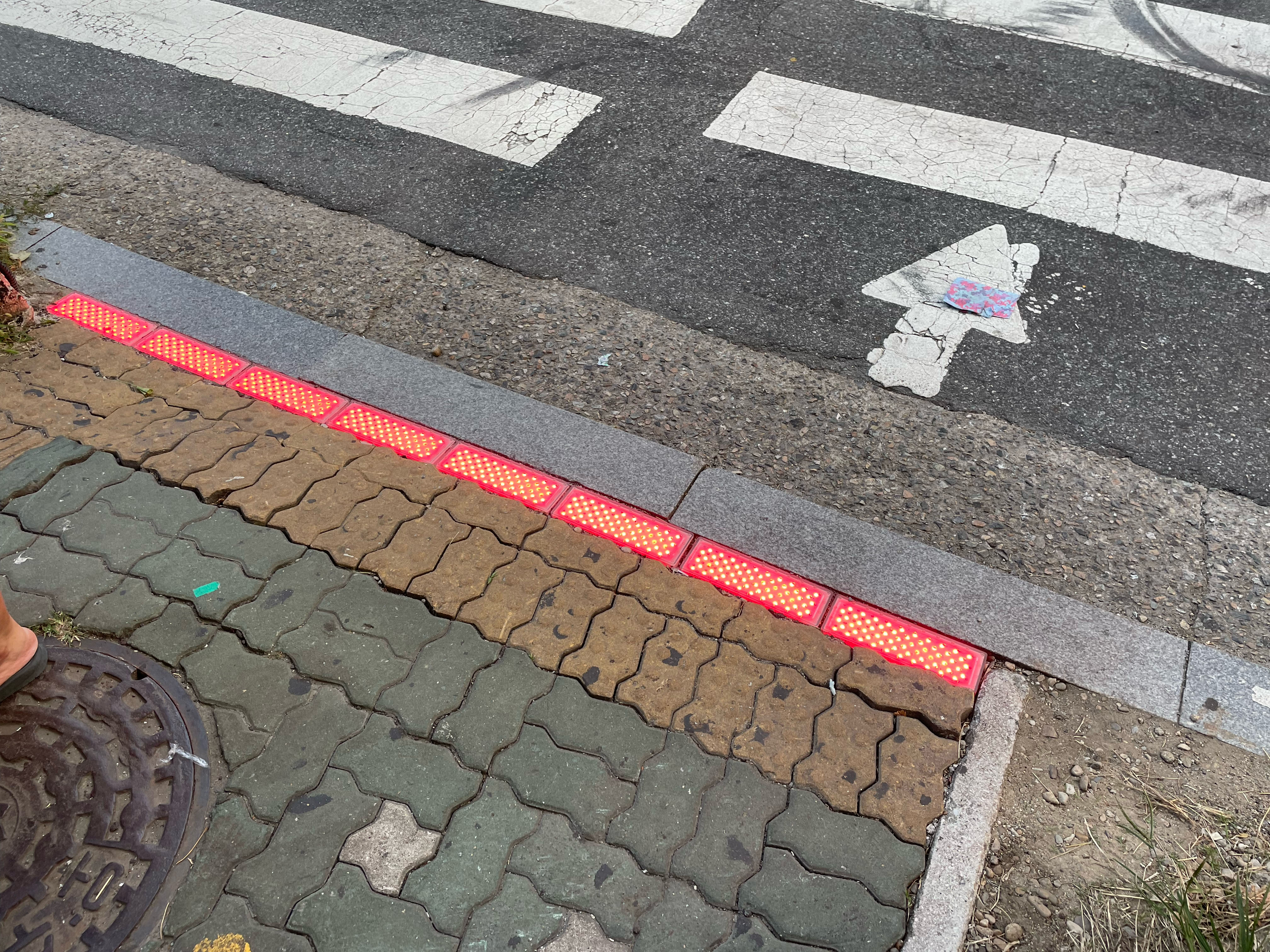
Smartphone zombie light in red, close up

=== Auditory and tactile signals ===
In some jurisdictions, such as Australia, pedestrian lights are associated with a sound device to benefit blind and visually impaired pedestrians. These make a slow beeping sound when the pedestrian lights are red and a continuous buzzing or fast beeping sound when the lights are green. In the Australian States of Queensland, New South Wales, Victoria, and Western Australia, the sound is produced in the same unit as the push buttons. In a circle above the button on a PB/5 crossing, the sound is produced and can be felt along with a raised arrow that points in the direction to walk.

This system of assistive technology is also widely used at busy intersections in Canadian cities. In the United Kingdom, the Puffin crossings and their predecessor, the Pelican crossing, will make a fast beeping sound to indicate that it is safe to cross the road. The beeping sound is disabled at night to avoid disturbing nearby residents.

In some states in the United States, at some busy intersections, buttons will make a beeping sound for blind people. When the light changes, a speaker built into the button will play a recording to notify blind people that it is safe to cross. When the signal flashes red, the recording will start the countdown timer. In several countries, such as New Zealand, technology also allows deaf and blind people to feel when lights have changed to allow safe crossing. A small pad, housed in an indentation in the base of the box containing the button mechanism, moves downward when the lights change to allow crossing. This is designed to be felt by anyone waiting to cross who has limited ability to detect visual or auditory cues.

In Japan, traffic lights emit an electronic sound that mimics birdsong to help the visually impaired. Some traffic lights fix the order and type of sounds so they can tell which direction has a green light. In general, "Piyo" (peep) and "Piyo-piyo", which is a small bird call, and "Kakkō" and "Ka-kakkō", which is a cuckoo call, are associated with this system. Some pedestrian crossings in Lithuania make a slow beeping sound indicating that the traffic light is about to turn off.

== Cycle signals ==
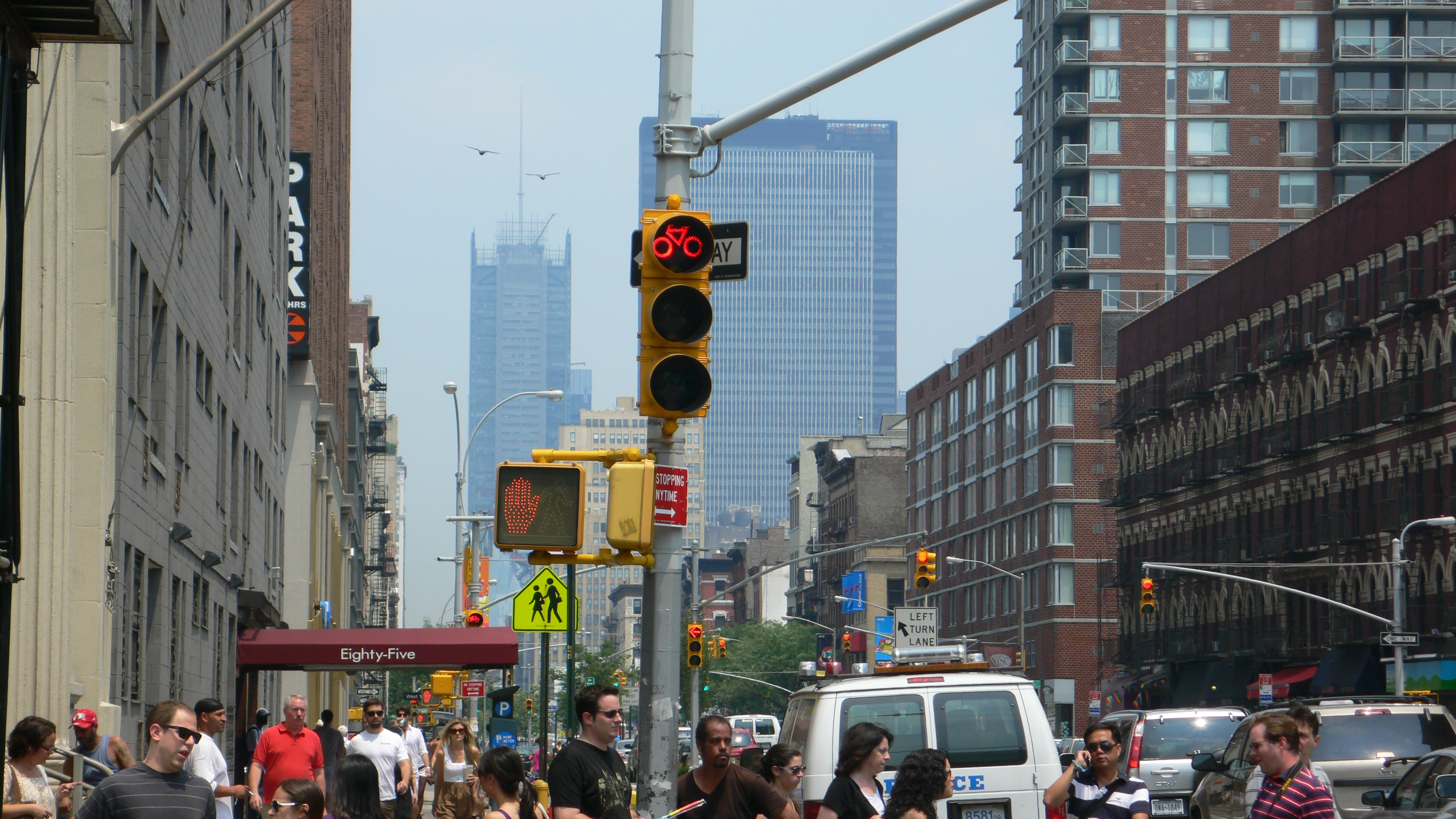
Traffic light for a bike lane, NYC

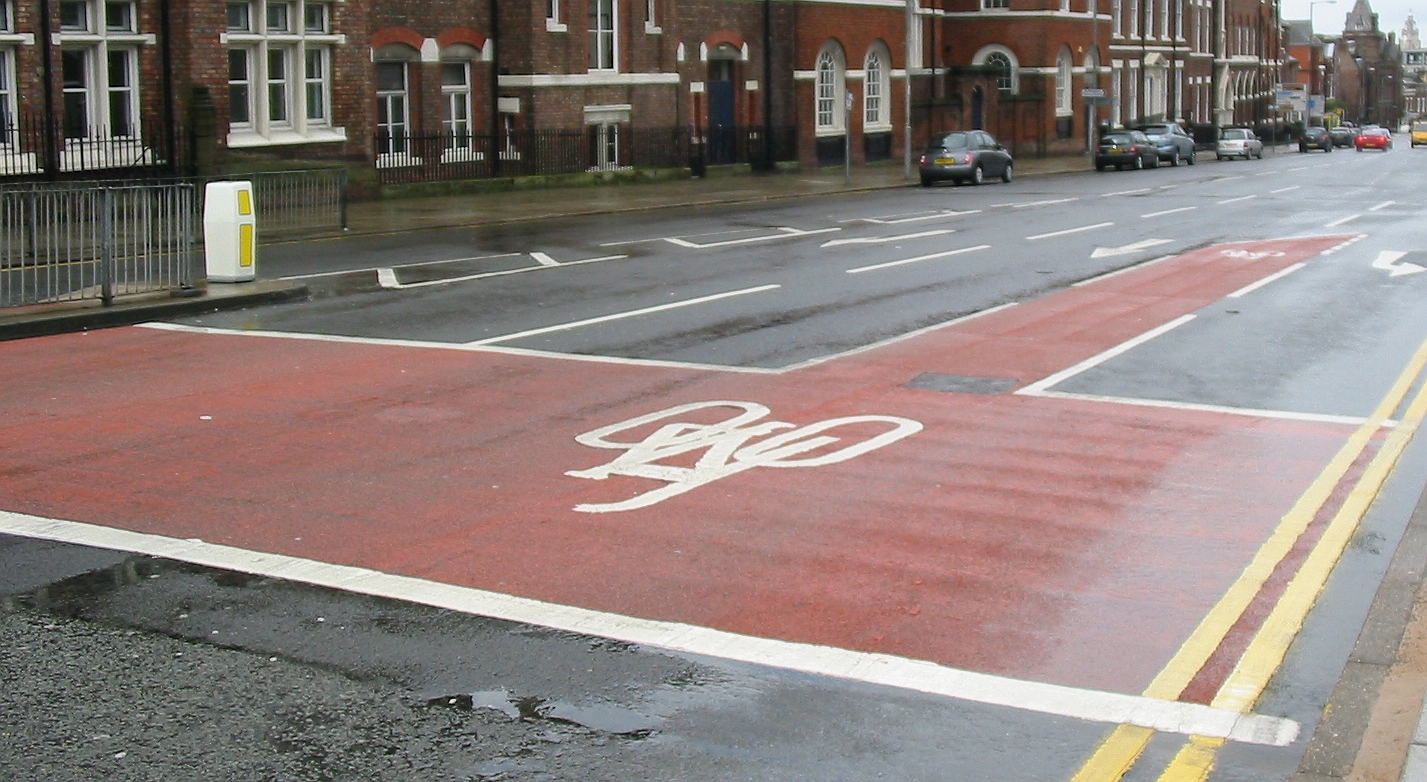
An advanced stop line at traffic lights in Liverpool

Where cycle lanes or cycle tracks exist on the approach to a signal-controlled junction, it must be considered how to safely incorporate cyclists into the junction to reduce conflicts between motor vehicles and cyclists.

An advanced stop line can be placed after the stop line at traffic lights. This allows cyclists to position themselves in front of traffic at a red light and get a head start.

In the US, design guidance typically recommends that the cycle lane continue through the junction to the left of the right-turn lane; however, this creates conflict for motor vehicles wishing to enter the right lane, as they must cross the cycle lane at a poor angle.

Under Dutch engineering principles, cyclists are instead kept to the right of the junction, with protected curbs. This improves safety by putting cyclists in the eyeline of motor vehicles at the stop line, giving cyclists a head start over turning traffic. This design also allows cyclists to complete far-side turns without waiting in the center of the junction. UK engineers have innovated on this design through the Cycle Optimised Protected Signals (CYCLOPS) junction, e.g., in Manchester. This places the cycle track around the edge of the signal junction, gives cyclists and pedestrians a single all-red phase entirely separate from motor traffic, and shortens pedestrian crossing times.

Alternatively, cyclists can be considered pedestrians on approach to a junction, or where a cycle track crosses a road, and combined pedestrian-cyclist traffic lights (known as Toucan crossings in the UK) can be provided.

== Public transport signals ==
Traffic lights for public transport often use signals that are distinct from those for private traffic. They can be letters, arrows, or bars of white or (typically) colored LED light (100-watt).

=== Transit signals in North America ===
MUTCD Fig. 8C-3
| Three-lens signal | | Two-lens signal | | |
|---|---|---|---|---|
| Single LRT route | Stop | | | |
| Single LRT route | Prepare to stop | (flashing) | Stop | |
| Single LRT route | Go | | Go | (Note: "Go" lens may be used in flashing mode to indicate "prepare to stop") |
| Two LRT route diversion | Stop | | | |
| Two LRT route diversion | Prepare to stop | (flashing) | Stop | |
| Two LRT route diversion | Go | (Note: Could be in single housing) | Go | |
| Two LRT route diversion | Stop | | | |
| Two LRT route diversion | Prepare to stop | (flashing) | Stop | |
| Two LRT route diversion | Go | | Go | |
| Three LRT route diversion | Stop | | | |
| Three LRT route diversion | Prepare to stop | (flashing) | Stop | |
| Three LRT route diversion | Go | | Go | |
Notes

MUTCD specifies a standard vertically oriented signal with either two or three lenses, displaying white lines on a black background.

Some systems use the letter B for buses and T for trams. The METRO light rail system in Minneapolis, Minnesota, the Valley Metro Rail in Phoenix, Arizona. The RTA Streetcar System in New Orleans uses a simplified variant of the Belgian/French system in the city's central business district, where only the "go" and "stop" configurations are used. A third signal, amber, is achieved by flashing the "go" signal.

=== Public transport signals in Europe ===
In some European countries and Russia, dedicated traffic signals for public transport (tram, as well as any that is using a dedicated lane) have four white lights that form the letter T. If the three top lamps are lit, this means "stop". If the bottom lamp and some lamps in the top row are lit, this indicates permission to proceed in the direction shown. At a tram signal, if there are no tram junctions or turns at an intersection, a simpler system of a single amber signal in the shape of the letter T is used instead; the tram must proceed only when the signal is lit.

In Northern European countries, tram signals feature white lights in different forms: "S" for "stop", "—" for "caution", and arrows indicating permitted passage in a given direction. In Sweden, all signals use white lighting and special symbols ("S", "–" and an arrow) to distinguish them from regular signals.

Tram signals in the Netherlands (top), Belgium, Luxembourg, France, and Germany (bottom)

The Netherlands uses a distinctive "negenoog" (nine-eyed) design shown on the top row of the diagram. Bottom row signals are used in Belgium, Luxembourg, France, and Germany. The signals mean (from left to right): "go straight ahead", "go left", "go right", "go in any direction" (like the "green" of a normal traffic light), "stop, unless the emergency brake is needed" (equal to "amber"), and "stop" (equal to "red").

=== Public transport signals in the Asia-Pacific region ===
In Japan, tram signals are under the regular vehicle signal; however, the color of the signal intended for trams is orange ("yellow"). The small light at the top tells the driver when the traffic light receives the vehicle's transponder signal. In Hong Kong, an amber T-signal is used for trams, in place of the green signal. At any tramway junction, another set of signals is available to indicate the direction of the tracks. In Australia and New Zealand, a white "B" or "T" sometimes replaces the green light, indicating that buses or trams (respectively) have right of way.

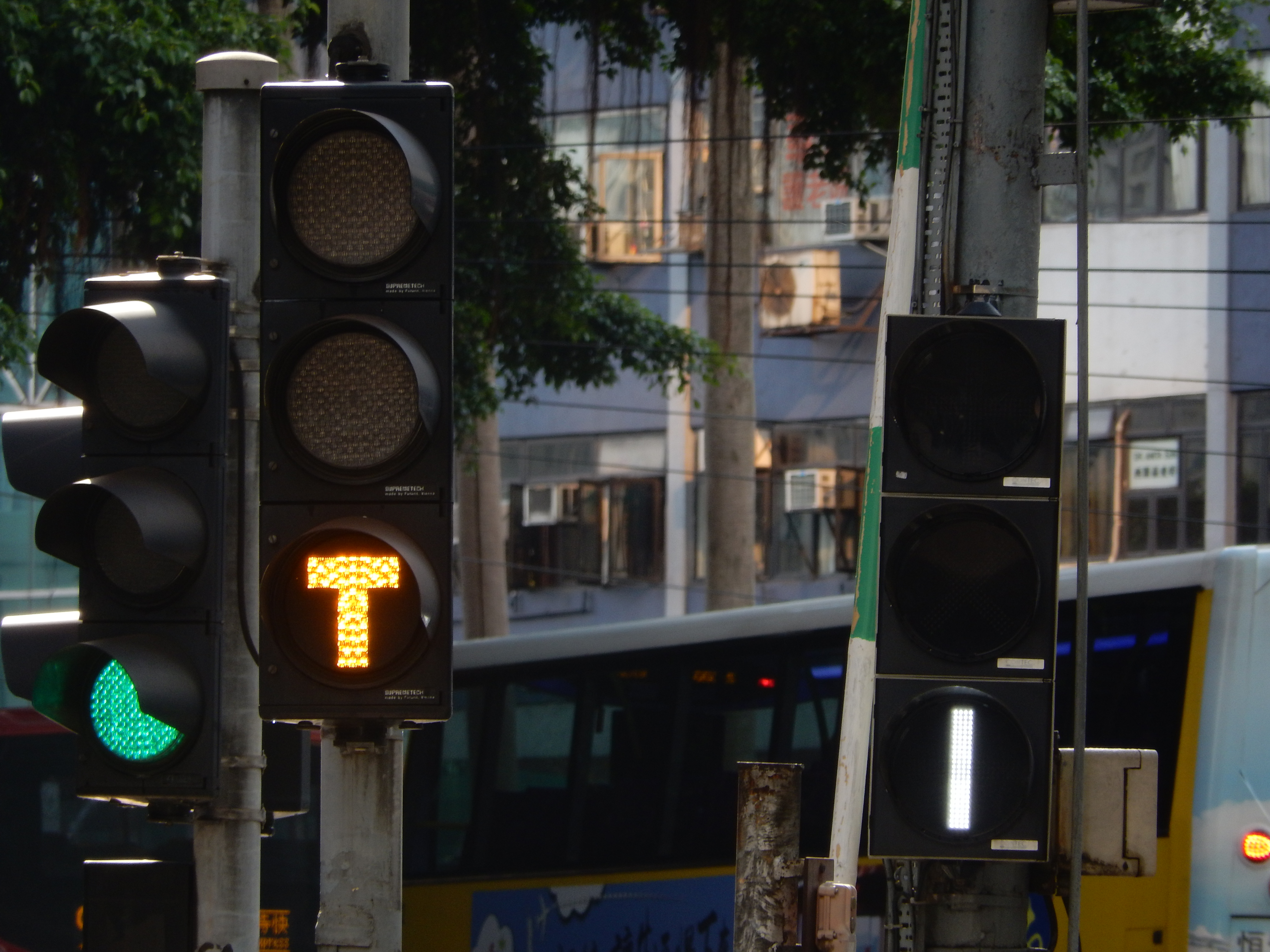
T signal (trams) in Hong Kong

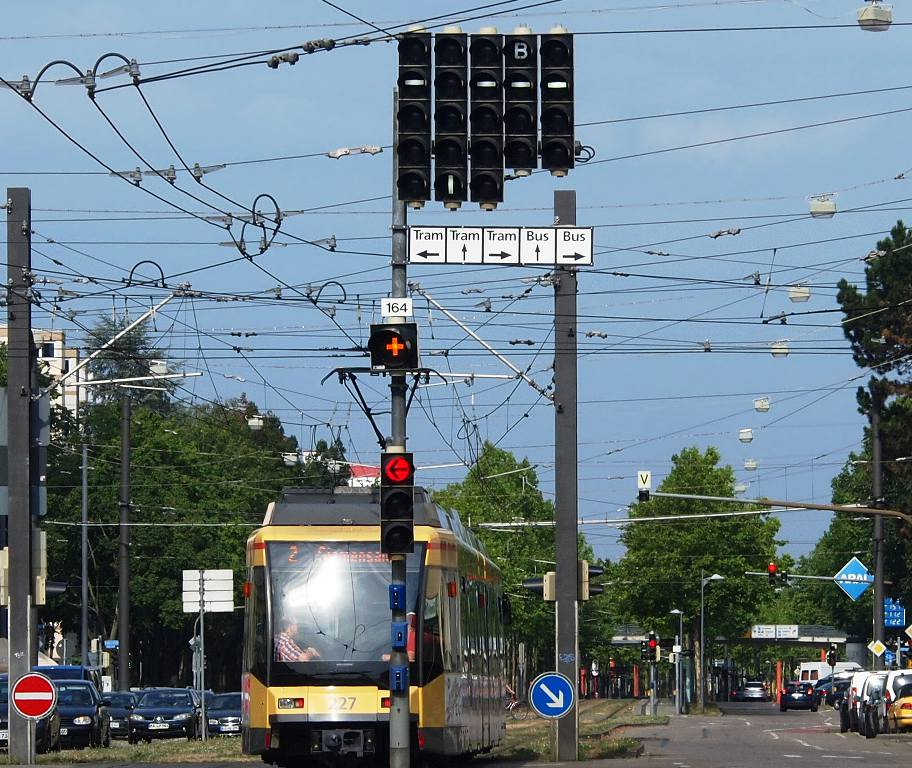
Bus and tram signals in Karlsruhe, Germany

=== Preemption and priority ===
Some regions have interruptible signals that give priority to special traffic, usually emergency vehicles such as firefighting apparatus, ambulances, and police cars. Most of the systems operate with small transmitters that send radio waves, infrared signals, or strobe light signals that are received by a sensor on or near the traffic lights. Some systems use audio detection, in which a specific type of siren must be used and detected by a receiver on the traffic light structure.

Upon activation, the normal traffic light cycle is suspended and replaced by the "preemption sequence": the traffic lights for all approaches to the intersection are switched to "red," except for the light for the vehicle that triggered the preemption sequence. Sometimes, an additional signal light is placed nearby to indicate to the preempting vehicle that the sequence has been activated and to warn other motorists of an approaching emergency vehicle. The normal traffic light cycle resumes after the sensor has been passed by the vehicle that triggered the preemption.

In most jurisdictions, in the absence of preemptive mechanisms, emergency vehicles are not required to respect traffic lights. Emergency vehicles must slow down, proceed cautiously and activate their emergency lights to alert oncoming drivers to the preemption when crossing an intersection against the light.

Unlike preemption, which immediately interrupts a signal's normal operation to serve the preempting vehicle and is usually reserved for emergency use, "priority" is a set of strategies intended to reduce delay for specific vehicles, especially mass transit vehicles such as buses. A variety of strategies exist to give priority to transit, but they generally work by detecting approaching transit vehicles and making small adjustments to signal timing. These adjustments are designed to either decrease the likelihood that the transit vehicle will arrive during a red interval or shorten the red interval for vehicles that are stopped. Priority does not guarantee that transit vehicles always get a green light the instant they arrive, as preemption does.

== Operation ==
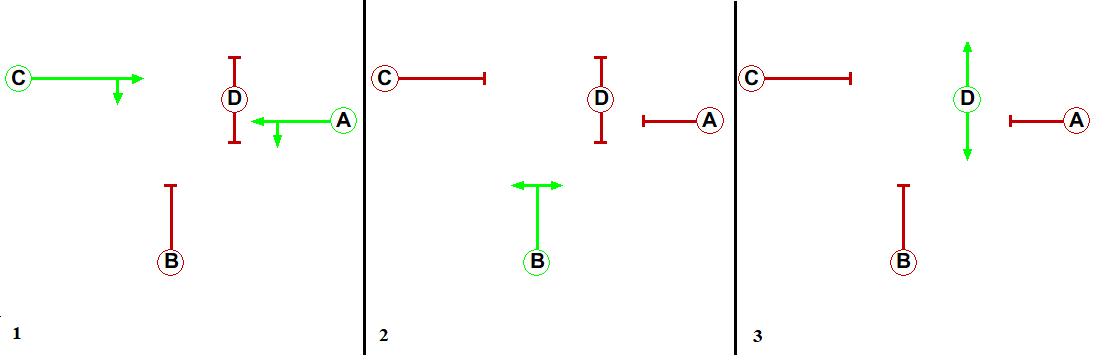
A staging diagram for a typical signalized T-junction

A variety of different control systems are used to operate signal cycles smoothly, ranging from simple clockwork mechanisms to sophisticated computerized control systems. Computerized systems are normally actuated, i.e., controlled by loop detectors or other sensors on junction approaches. Area-wide coordination can allow green wave systems to be set up for vehicles or cycle tracks. Smart traffic light systems combine traditional actuation, a wider array of sensors, and artificial intelligence to improve the performance of signal systems further. A traffic signal junction or crossing is typically controlled by a controller mounted inside a cabinet nearby.

"Phases" (or "signal groups" in Australia and New Zealand) are indications shown simultaneously, e.g., multiple green lights which control the same traffic approach. A "movement" is any path through the junction that vehicles or pedestrians are permitted to take, which is "conflicting" if these paths cross one another. A stage (or "phase" in ANZ) is a group of non-conflicting phases that move at the same time. The stages are collectively known as a "cycle".

The time between two conflicting green phases is called an "intergreen period", which is set to an appropriate length to allow the junction to clear safely, especially for turning traffic that may be waiting in the center of the junction. This often results in an all-red stage, in which all approaches are shown red, and no vehicle can proceed. This all-red is sometimes extended to allow a pedestrian scramble, where pedestrians can cross the empty junction in any direction all at once. Some signals have no "all red" phase: the light turns green for cross traffic the instant the other light turns red. (Note: These are typically older signals. There are many examples of this in Houston, Texas. Suspended lights constructed so that a single source simultaneously illuminates all four directions always have this characteristic: Red (in two directions) and green (in the two cross directions) with Red-Yellow-Green sequence on two sides and Green-Yellow-Red sequence on the cross sides)

Many traffic light installations are fitted with vehicle actuation, i.e., detection, to improve the flexibility of traffic systems to respond to varying traffic flows. Detectors come in the form of digital sensors fitted to the signal heads or induction loops embedded in the road surface. Induction loops are beneficial due to their lower likelihood of failure, but their simplicity can limit their ability to handle certain situations, particularly those involving lighter vehicles such as motorcycles or pedal cycles. This situation most often occurs at times of day when other traffic is sparse as well as when the small vehicle is coming from a direction that does not have a high volume of traffic.

=== Timing ===
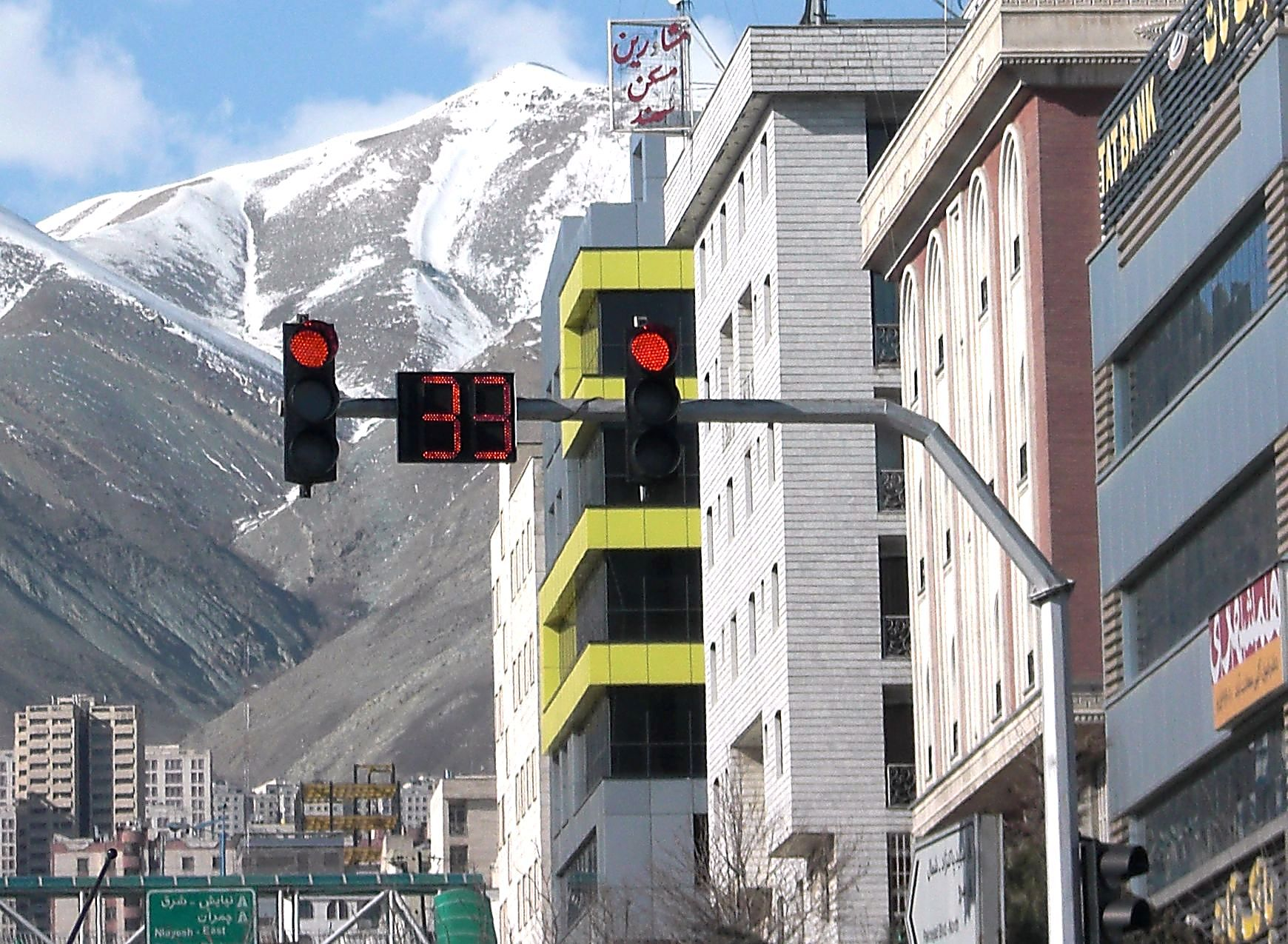
A traffic light with a timer in Tehran, Iran

The timing of the intergreen is usually based on the size of the intersection, which can range from two to five seconds. Modeling programs include the ability to calculate intergreen times automatically. Intergreen periods are determined by calculating the path distance for every conflict point in the junction, which is the distance travelled to the conflict point by the movement losing right of way minus the distance travelled to the same conflict point by the movement gaining right of way using the possible conflict points (including with pedestrians) and calculating both the time it would take the last vehicle to clear the furthest collision point and the first vehicle from the next stage to arrive at the conflict point. At actuated junctions, intergreens can be adjusted to accommodate traffic conditions.

Engineers also need to set the amber timings (and red–amber, where appropriate), which is normally standardized by a traffic authority. For example, in the UK, the amber time is fixed nationally at three seconds and the red–amber time at two seconds, which results in a minimum intergreen time of five seconds (plus any all-red time). The US also uses a minimum of three seconds, but local traffic authorities can make timings longer, especially on wider, suburban roads. This variation has sparked controversy when municipalities with shorter amber times use red-light cameras. Where pedestrian signals are used, the timing of the "inivitation to cross" – the period where a steady walk signal shows – and clearance periods – time when the walk signal flashes or no signal is shown – need to be calculated. This is normally set against a design speed, e.g. 1.2 m/s (3.9 ft/s). Similarly, these can be made extendable using sensors, allowing slower-moving pedestrians more time to cross the street.

=== Design guidance ===
National or sub-national highway authorities often issue guidance documents on the specification of traffic signals and the design of signalized intersections in accordance with national or local regulations. For example, in the United States, the Federal Highway Administration issues the Manual on Uniform Traffic Control Devices and the Signalized Intersections Information Guide, which is a synthesis of best practices and treatments to help practitioners make informed decisions.

== Variable lane control ==
An LED 50-watt typical lane control signal head

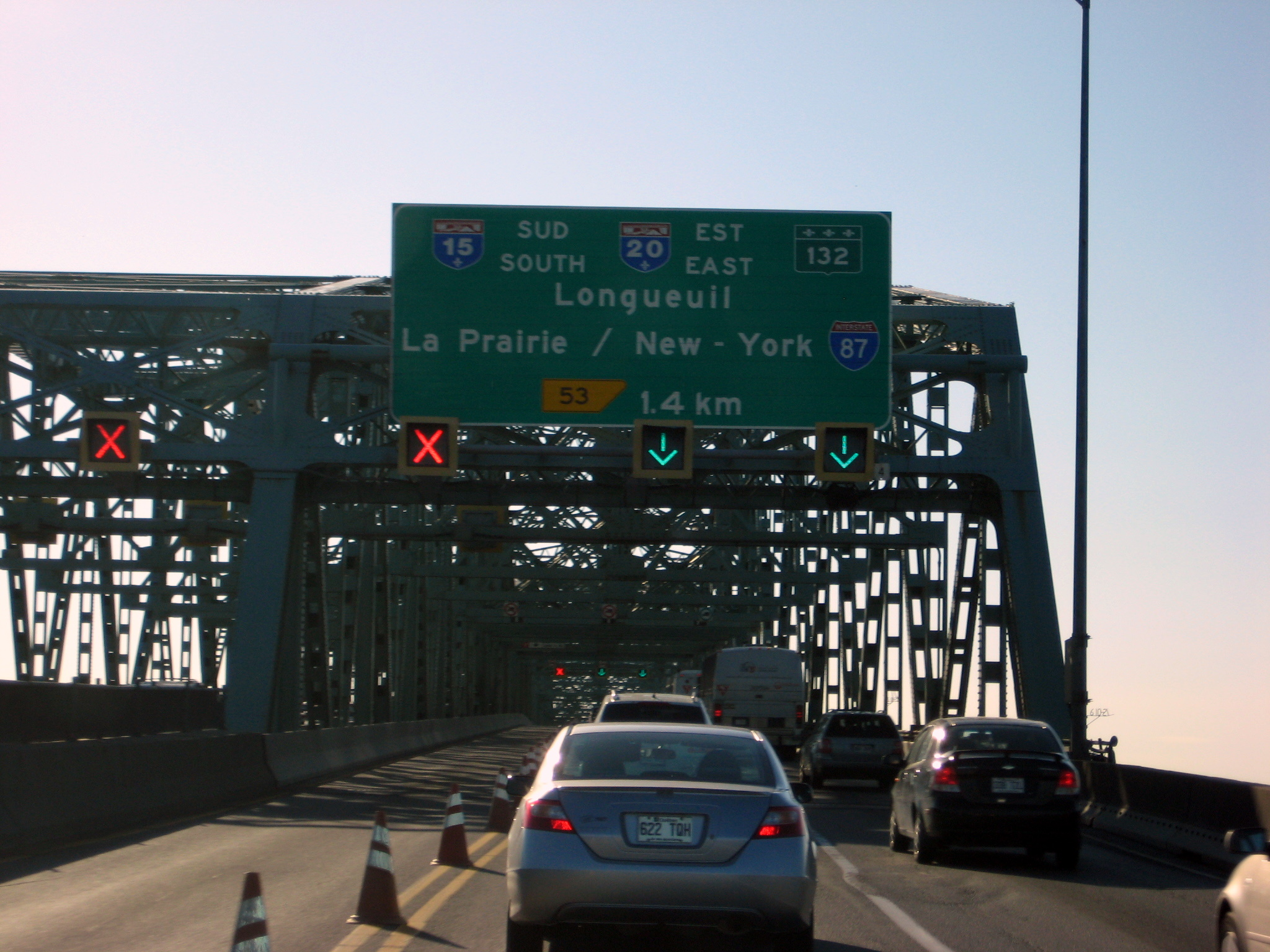
Lane control signals installed on the Old Champlain Bridge in Montréal, Canada

Variable lane control is a form of intelligent transportation systems that uses lane-use control signals, typically on a gantry above a carriageway. These lights are used in tidal flow systems to allow or forbid traffic to use one or more of the available lanes by the use of green lights or arrows (to permit) or by red lights or crosses (to prohibit). Variable lane control may be in use at toll plazas to indicate open or closed booths; during heavy traffic to facilitate merging traffic from a slip road.

In the US, most notably in the Southeastern region, there is often a "continuous-flow" lane. This lane is protected by a single, constant-green arrow pointing down at the lane(s) permitting the continuous flow of traffic, without regard to the condition of signals for other lanes or cross streets. Continuous lanes are restricted in that vehicles turning from a side street may not cross over the double white line to enter the continuous lane. No lane changes are permitted to the continuous lane from an adjacent lane or from the continuous lane to an adjacent lane until the double white line has been passed. Some continuous lanes are protected by a raised curb located between the continuous lane and a normal traffic lane, with white and/or amber reflective paint or tape, prohibiting turning or adjacent traffic from entering the lane.

Continuous-flow traffic lanes are found only at "T" intersections where there is no side street or driveway entrance on the right side of the main thoroughfare. No pedestrians are permitted to cross the main thoroughfare at intersections with a continuous-flow lane, although crossing at the side street may be permitted.

Intersections with continuous-flow lanes will be posted with a white regulatory sign approximately 500 ft (150 m) before the intersection, bearing the phrase "right lane continuous traffic" or similar wording. If the arrow is extinguished for any reason, whether by malfunction or design, traffic through the continuous lane will revert to the normal traffic pattern for adjacent lanes, except that turning or moving into or out of the restricted lane is still prohibited.

== Waterways and railways ==
The three-aspect standard is also used at locks on the Upper Mississippi River. Red means that another vessel is passing through. Amber means that the lock chamber is being emptied or filled to match the level of the approaching vessel. After the gate opens, green means that the vessel may enter.

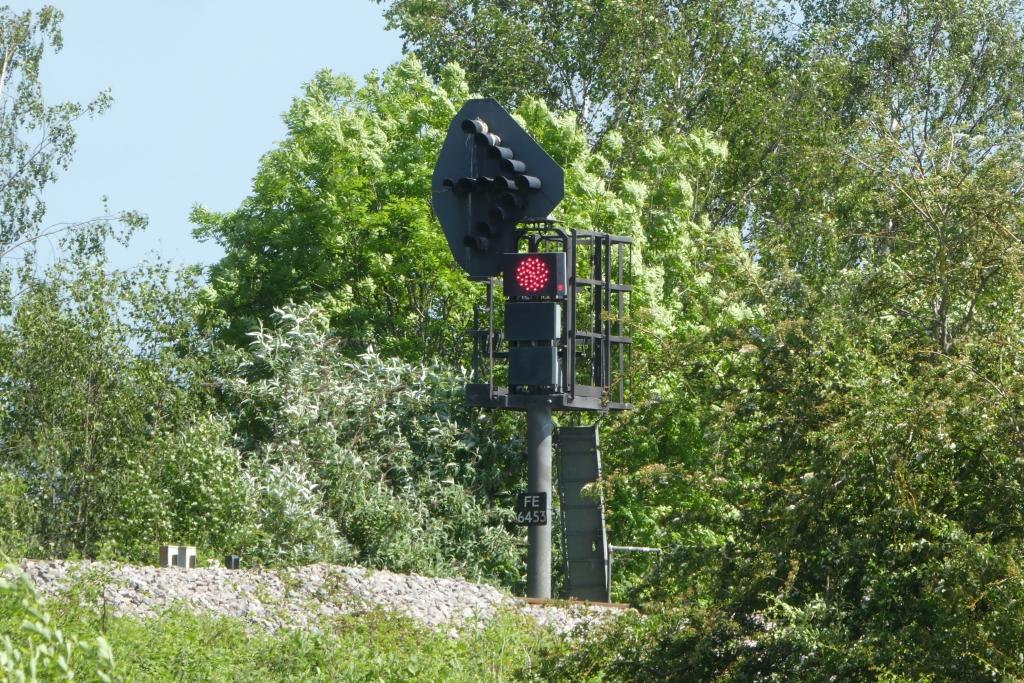
FE6453 railway signal in Beal, Northumberland, UK

Railroad signals, for stopping trains in their own right of way, generally use the opposite positioning of the colors; that is, for signals above the driver's eyeline, green on top and red below is the standard placement of the signal colors on railroad tracks. There are three reasons for this variation: there is no risk that railway signals will be masked by a tall vehicle between the driver and the signal; train speeds in fog are much higher than for road vehicles, so the most restrictive signal must be closest to the driver's eyeline; and with railway signals often in exposed rural locations, there is a risk of any signal other than the bottom one being masked by snow building up on the hood of the signal below.

== Rules ==
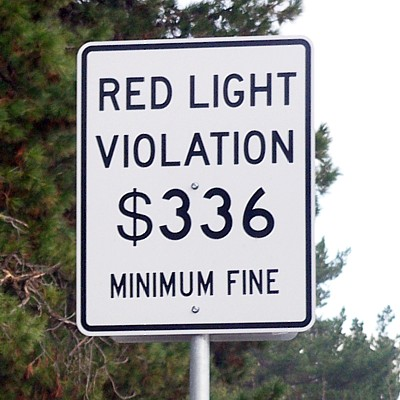
California attempts to discourage red light running by posting the minimum fine.

Traffic lights control flows of traffic using social norms and legal rules. In most jurisdictions, it is against the law to disobey traffic signals and police, and devices such as red light cameras can issue fines or other penalties – and, in some cases, prosecute – drivers who break those laws. US-based studies have found that the majority of drivers think that it is dangerous to run a red light at speed and the most common reason for red light running include inattentive driving, following an oversized vehicle or during inclement weather.

The rules governing traffic light junctions for vehicles differ by jurisdiction. For example, in North America it is common for drivers to turn curb-to-curb (i.e., turn right at most junctions), even when a red light is showing. This turn on red rule is uncommon in Europe, unless an arrow signal or traffic sign specifically permits it.

== Design ==
=== Bulbs ===
Conventional traffic signal lighting, still common in some areas, uses a standard light bulb. The light then bounces off a mirrored glass or polished aluminum reflector bowl, and out through a polycarbonate plastic or glass signal lens. In some signals, these lenses were cut to include a specific refracting pattern. Traditionally, incandescent and halogen bulbs were used. Because of the low efficiency of light output and a single point of failure (filament burnout), some traffic authorities are choosing to retrofit traffic signals with LED arrays that consume less power, have increased light output, and last significantly longer.

In the event of an individual LED failure, the aspect will still operate, albeit with a reduced light output. The light pattern of an LED array can be comparable to the pattern of an incandescent or halogen bulb fitted with a prismatic lens.

The low energy consumption of LED lights can pose a driving risk in some areas during winter. Unlike incandescent and halogen bulbs, which generally get hot enough to melt away any snow that may settle on individual lights, LED displays – using only a fraction of the energy – remain too cool for this to happen. As a response to the safety concerns, a heating element on the lens was developed.

=== Programmable visibility signals ===
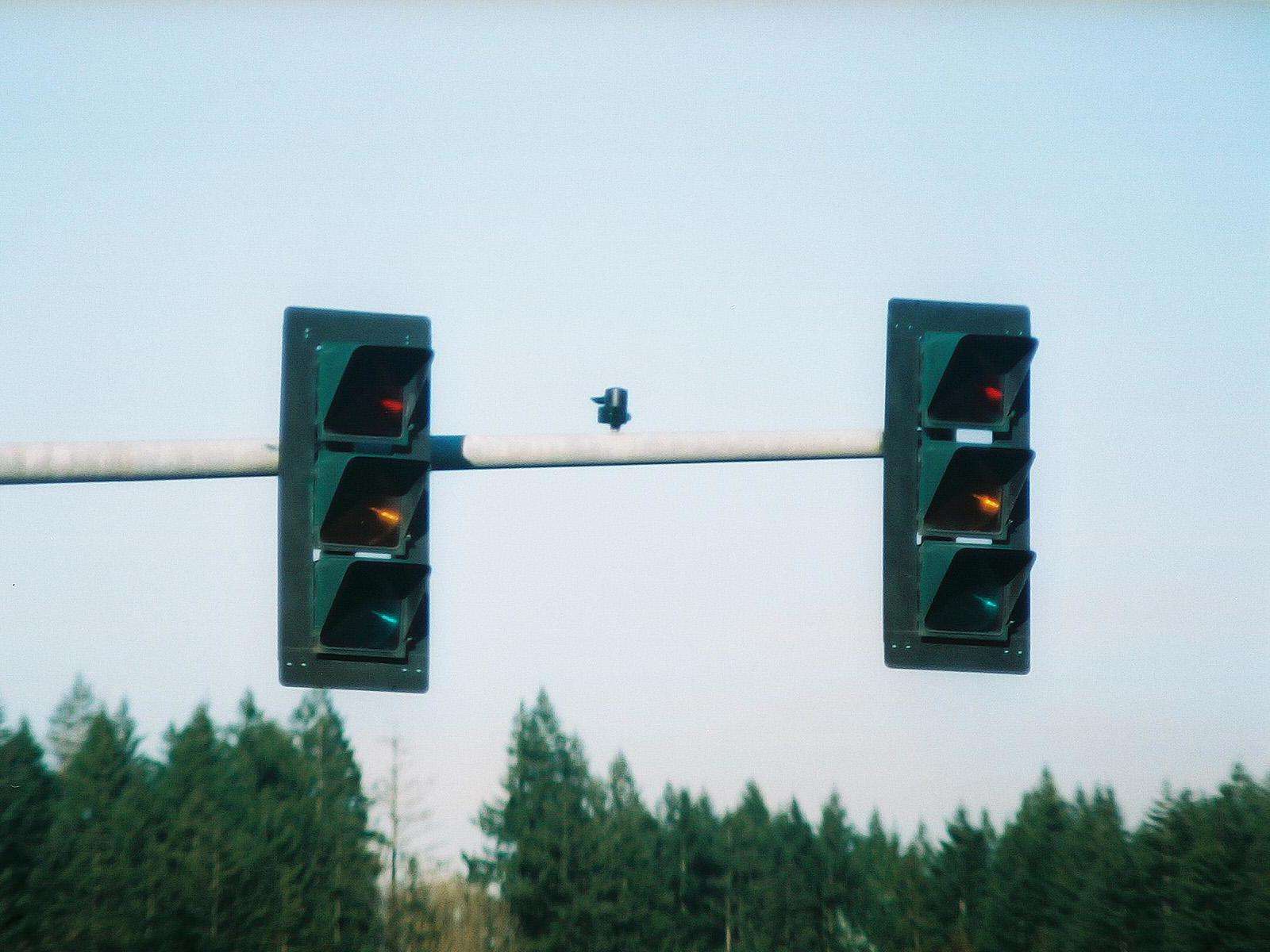
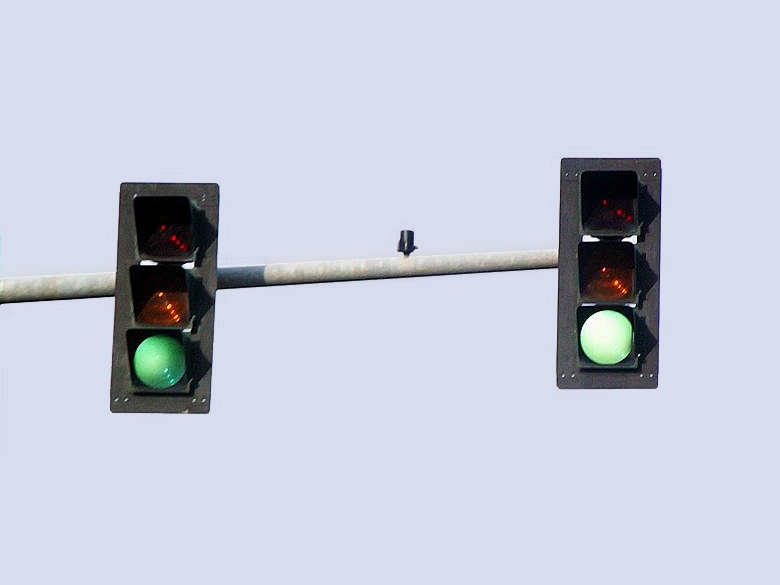
Traffic signals installed in Shelton, Washington, seen off-axis from the intended viewing area (top) and from the signal's intended viewing area (bottom).
From off-axis, these signals appear to be "off" or invisible to adjacent lanes of traffic during the daytime. Only a faint glow is visible at night.

Signals such as the 3M High Visibility Signal utilize light-diffusing optics and a Fresnel lens to create the signal indication. The light from a 150 W PAR46 sealed-beam lamp in these "programmable visibility" signals passes through a set of two glass lenses at the back of the signal. The first lens, a frosted-glass diffusing lens, spreads the light into a uniform ball of light about 5 inches in diameter. The light then passes through a nearly identical lens known as an optical limiter (3M's definition of the lens itself), also known as a "programming lens", also five inches in diameter.

Using a special aluminum-foil-based adhesive tape, these signals are "masked" or programmed by the programming lens so that only certain lanes of traffic will see the indication. At the front of these programmable visibility signals is a 12" Fresnel lens, each lens tinted to meet United States Institute of Transportation Engineers (ITE) chromaticity and luminance standards. The Fresnel lens collimates the light output created by the lamp and creates a uniform display of light for the lane in which it is intended.

In addition to being positioned and mounted for desired visibility for their respective traffic, some traffic lights are also aimed, louvered, or shaded to minimize misinterpretation from other lanes. For example, a Fresnel lens on an adjacent through-lane signal may be aimed to prevent left-turning traffic from anticipating its own green arrow. Intelight Inc. manufactures a programmable traffic signal that uses a software-controlled LED array and electronics to steer the light beam toward the desired approach.

The signal is programmed unlike the 3M and McCain models. It requires a connection to a laptop or smartphone running the manufacturer's software. Connections can be made directly with a direct-serial interface kit, or wirelessly with a radio kit over WIFI to the signal. In addition to aiming, Fresnel lenses, and louvers, visors and back panels are also useful in areas where sunlight would diminish the contrast and visibility of a signal face. Typical applications for these signals were skewed intersections, specific multi-lane control, left-turn pocket signals, or other areas with complex traffic situations.

An animated GIF shows a traffic light in 3 reverted phases: red, yellow, then green

=== Size ===
In the United States, traffic lights are currently designed with lights approximately 12 inches (300 mm) in diameter. Previously, the standard had been 8 inches (200 mm); however, those are slowly being phased out in favor of the larger and more visible 12 inch lights. Variations used have also included a hybrid design, which had one or more 12 inch lights along with one or more lights of 8 inches (200 mm) on the same light.

In the United Kingdom, 12-inch lights were implemented only with Mellor Design Signal heads designed by David Mellor. These were designed for symbolic optics to compensate for the light loss caused by the symbol. Following a study sponsored by the UK Highways Agency and completed by Aston University, Birmingham, UK, an enhanced optical design was introduced in the mid-1990s.

Criticism of sunlight washout (cannot see the illuminated signal due to sunlight falling on it), and sun-phantom (signal appearing to be illuminated even when not due to sunlight reflecting from the parabolic mirror at low sun angles), led to the design of a signal that used lenslets to focus light from a traditional incandescent bulb through apertures in a matt black front mask. This cured both problems in an easily manufactured solution. This design proved successful and was taken into production by several traffic signal manufacturers through the engineering designs of Dr. Mark Aston, working firstly at the SIRA Ltd in Kent, and latterly as an independent optical designer.

The manufacturers took a license for the generic design from the Highways Agency, with Dr. Aston engineering a unique solution for each manufacturer. Producing both bulb and LED versions of the signal aspects, these signals are still the most common type of traffic light on UK roads. With the invention of anti-phantom, highly visible Aston lenses, lights of 8 inches (200 mm) could be designed to deliver the same output as plain lenses, making a larger surface area unnecessary. Consequently, lights of 12 inches (300 mm) are no longer approved for use in the UK and all lights installed on new installations have to be 200 mm (8 in) in accordance with TSRGD (Traffic Signs Regulations and General Directions). Exemptions are made for temporary or replacement signals.

=== Mounting and placement ===
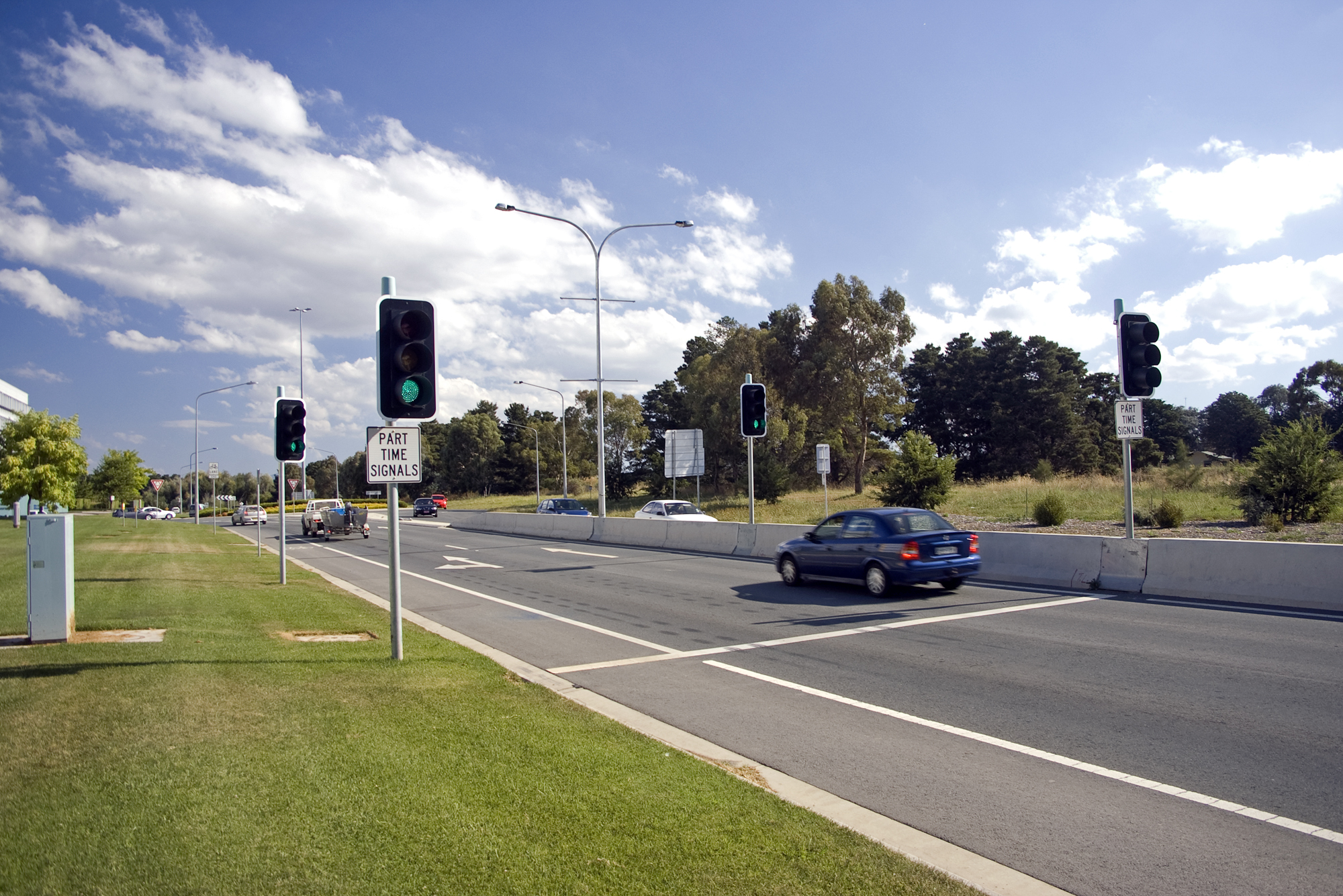
Part time pole/pedestal-mounted traffic lights in Canberra, Australia

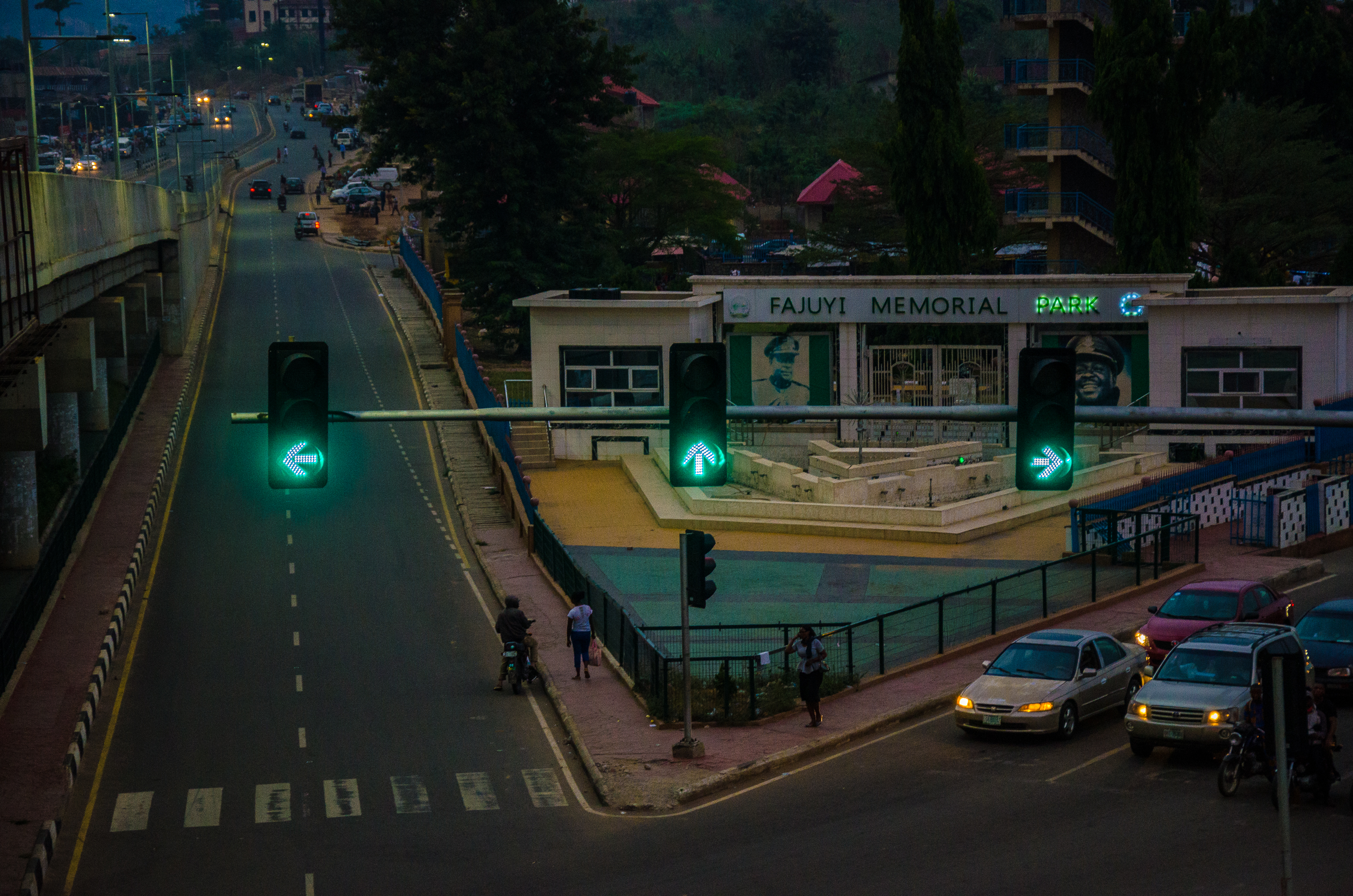
Mast-arm traffic lights in Ekiti State, Nigeria

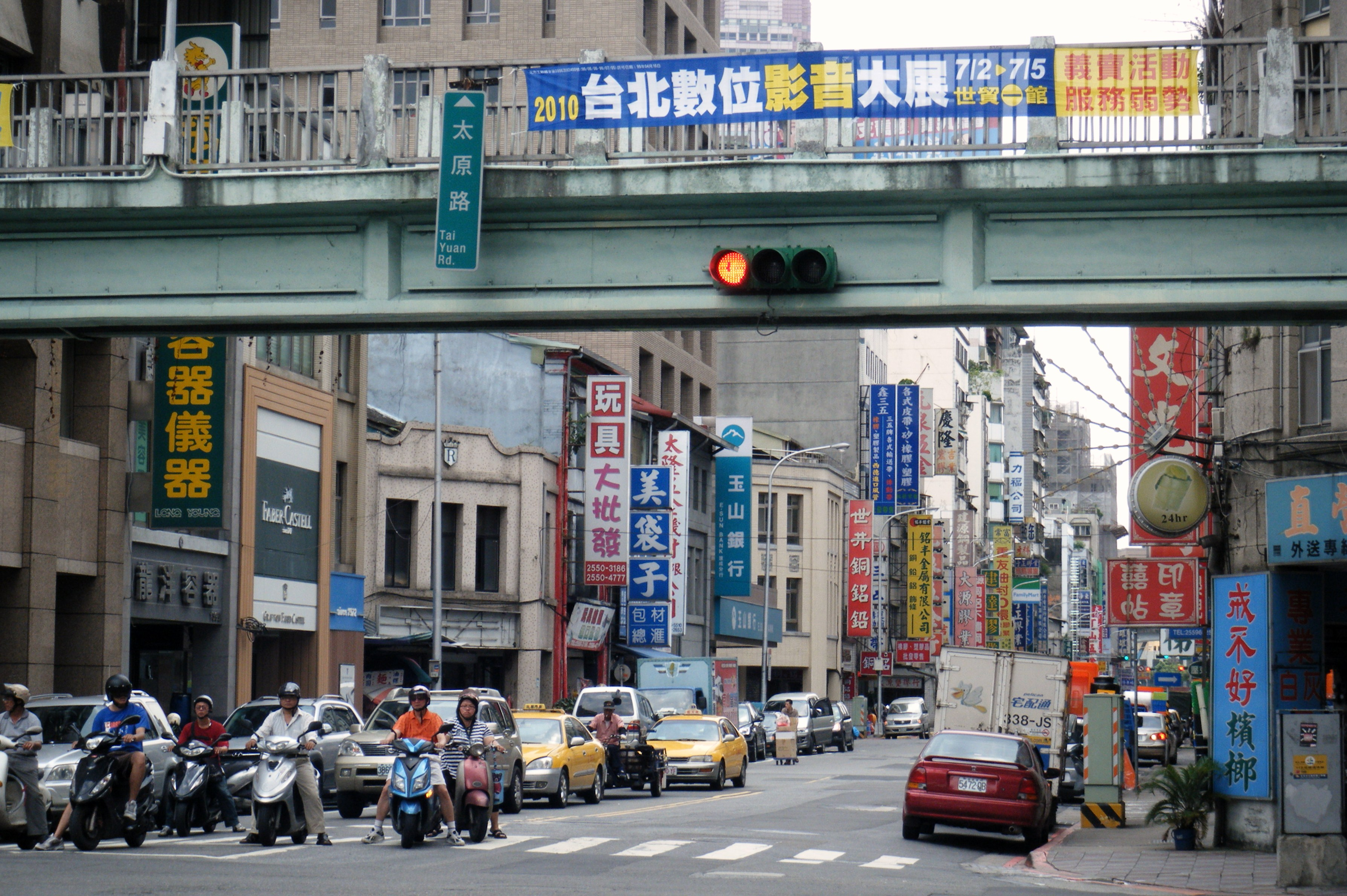
Horizontal traffic lights mounted on a footbridge in Taipei, Taiwan

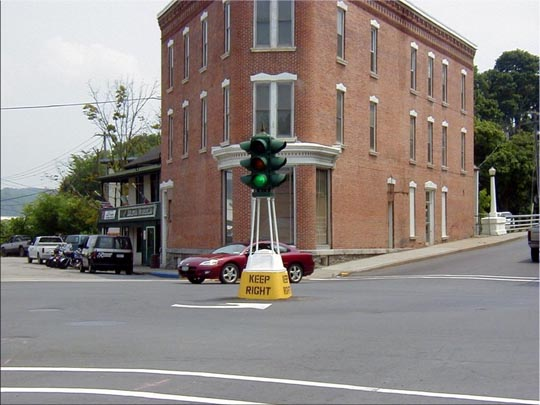
A dummy light in Canajoharie, New York. It was removed in 2021, but reinstalled in 2025.

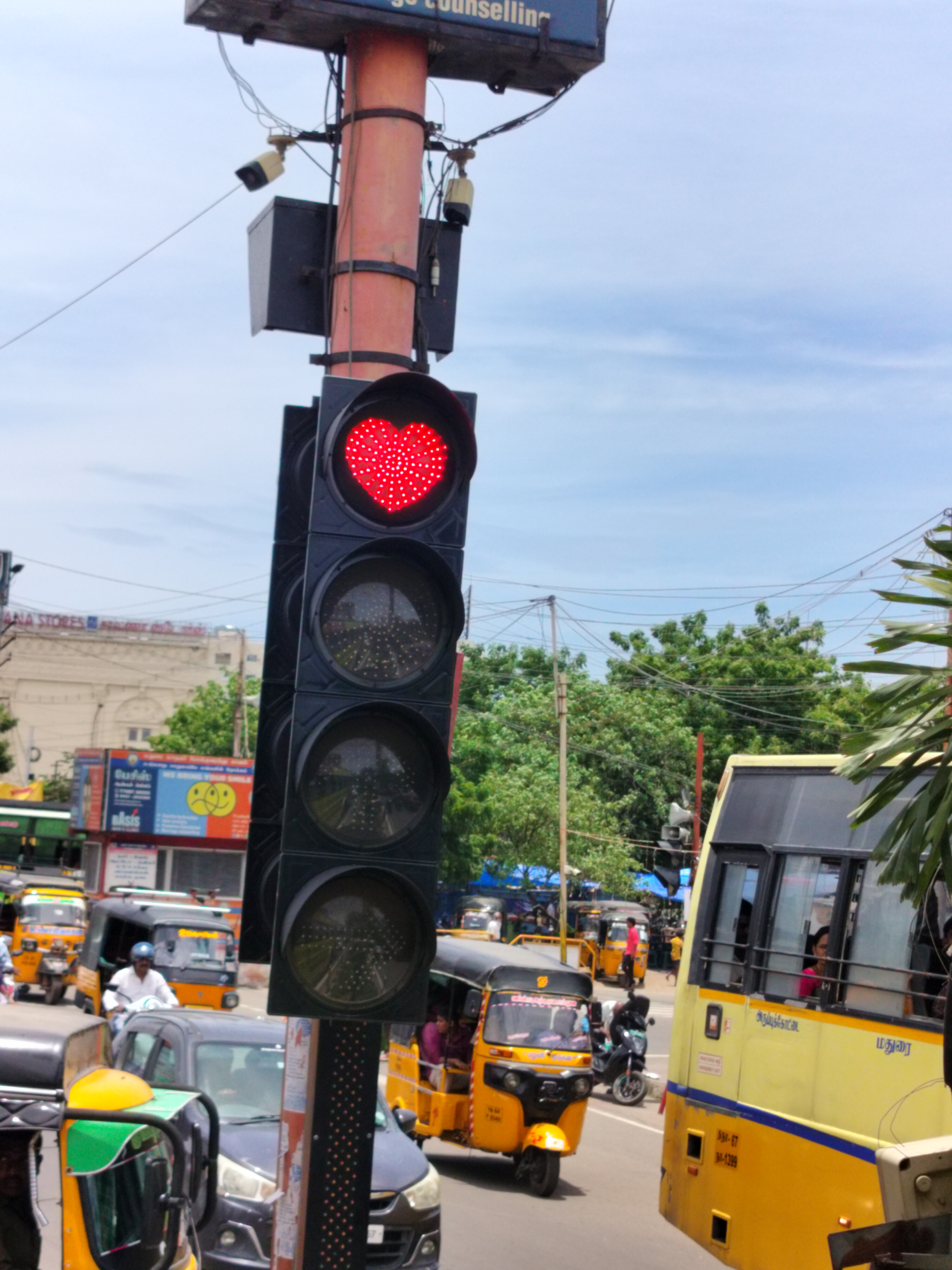
Heart shaped traffic signal installed in Madurai city in the Indian State of Tamil Nadu.

The MUTCD identifies five types of traffic light mounts. On pedestals, signal heads are mounted on a single pole. This is the normal installation method for the UK. On mast arms, signal heads are mounted on a rigid arm over the road protuding from the pole. On strained poles, signals are suspended over a roadway on a wire, attached to poles at opposite curbs. This is the most common installation method in the United States. Unipoles are similar to strain poles, but a single structure over the road, rather than two poles linked with a wire. Signals can be attached to existing structures such as an overpass. Dummy lights are traffic signs located in the center of a junction, which operate on a fixed cycle. These have generally been decommissioned due to safety concerns. A number remains due to its historical value.

Common span wire mounting configurations

Simple two-pole span

Box span

Suspended box span

Z-span

U-span

Signals can either be placed nearside – between the stop line and the curb line of the intersecting road – or farside – on the opposite side of the junction. In European countries, signals are often placed on the nearside. In the UK, at least two signal heads are required, known as the primary and secondary heads, one of which is normally nearside and the other of which could be nearside or farside. In the US, signals are normally located farside, though in some states, nearside signals are also used. Nearside signals can be beneficial to road safety, as drivers have more time to see a red light and are less likely to encroach on pedestrian crossings.

== Effects ==
Drivers spend on average around 2% of journey time passing through signalized junctions. Traffic lights can increase the traffic capacity at intersections and reduce delay for side road traffic, but can also result in increased delay for main road traffic. Hans Monderman, the innovative Dutch traffic engineer, and pioneer of shared space schemes, was skeptical of their role, and is quoted as having said of them: "We only want traffic lights where they are useful and I haven't found anywhere where they are useful yet."

A World Economic Forum study found that signalized junctions are associated with higher levels of localized air pollution. Drivers accelerate and stop frequently at lights, and as such, peak particle concentration can be around 29 times higher than during free-flow conditions. The WEF recommends that traffic authorities synchronize traffic signals, consider alternative traffic management systems, and consider placing traffic lights away from residential areas, schools, and hospitals.

Separating conflicting streams of traffic in time can reduce the likelihood of right-angle collisions by turning traffic and cross traffic, but it can increase the frequency of rear-end crashes by up to 50%. Since right-angled and turn-against-traffic collisions are more likely to result in injuries, this is often an acceptable trade-off. They can also adversely affect the safety of bicycle and pedestrian traffic. Between 1979 and 1988, the city of Philadelphia, Pennsylvania, removed signals at 199 intersections that were not warranted. On average, the intersections had 24% fewer crashes after the unwarranted signals were removed. The traffic lights had been erected in the 1960s because of since-resolved protests over traffic. By 1992, over 800 traffic lights had been removed at 426 intersections, and the number of crashes at these intersections dropped by 60%.

== Justification ==
Criteria have been developed to ensure that new traffic lights are installed only where they will do more good than harm, and to justify the removal of existing traffic lights where removal is not warranted. They are most often placed on arterial roads at intersections with another arterial or collector road, or on an expressway where an interchange is not warranted. In some situations, traffic signals can also be found on collector roads in busy settings.

=== United States ===
The International Municipal Signal Association provides input on standards for traffic signals and control devices. One example is the input the association provided for the Manual on Uniform Traffic Control Devices (MUTCD). The MUTCD is issued by the Federal Highway Administration (FHWA) of the United States Department of Transportation (USDOT).

In the United States, the criteria for installation of a traffic control signal are prescribed by the Manual on Uniform Traffic Control Devices (MUTCD), which defines the criteria in nine warrants:

- Eight-hour vehicular volume. Traffic volume must exceed the prescribed minimum for eight hours of an average weekday.
- Four-hour vehicular volume. Traffic volume must exceed the prescribed minimum for four hours of an average weekday.
- Peak hour volume or delay. This is applied only in unusual cases, such as office parks, industrial complexes, and park and ride lots that attract or discharge large numbers of vehicles in a short time, and for a minimum of one hour of an average weekday. Traffic on the side road suffers undue delays when entering or crossing the major street.
- Pedestrian volume. If the traffic volume on a major street is so heavy that pedestrians experience excessive delays in attempting to cross it.
- School crossing. If the traffic density at school crossing times exceeds one per minute, it is considered to provide too few gaps in traffic for children to safely cross the street.
- Coordinated signal system. For places where adjacent traffic control signals do not keep traffic grouped efficiently.
- Crash experience. The volumes in the eight- and four-hour warrants may be reduced if five or more right-angle and cross traffic turn collisions have happened at the intersection in twelve months.
- Roadway network. Installing traffic control signals at some intersections might be justified to encourage the concentration and organization of traffic flow across the roadway network.
- Intersection near a grade crossing. A traffic signal is often justified at an intersection near a railroad crossing to provide a preemption sequence that allows traffic queued on the tracks to clear them before the train arrives.

In the US, an intersection is usually required to meet one or more of these warrants before a signal is installed. However, meeting one or more warrants does not require installing a traffic signal; it only suggests that a signal may be suitable. It could be that a roundabout would work better. There may be other unconsidered conditions that lead traffic engineers to conclude that a signal is undesirable. For example, it may be decided not to install a signal at an intersection if traffic stopped by it will back up and block another, more heavily trafficked intersection. Also, if a signal meets only the peak-hour warrant, the advantages during that time may not outweigh the disadvantages during the rest of the day.

=== China ===
In China, the standards for setting traffic signals is defined in GB 14886-2016: Specifications for road traffic signal setting and installation, published in 2016 and implemented in 2017. A signal shall be placed at intersections that meet the following criteria:

- Peak hour vehicular volume exceeds prescribed minima
- A continuous eight-hour average vehicular volume exceeds prescribed minima
- Accident history
  - On average, more than 5 accidents that could have been prevented with traffic signals per year in the past 3 years
  - On average, more than 1 fatal accident
- Any intersections that meet 80% of two of the three criteria listed above
- Entrance to one-way streets for vehicular traffic
- Pedestrian signals shall be placed at signalized intersections with crosswalk marks
- Intersections with exclusive turning lanes and multiple signal phases shall use a turning traffic signal
- Reversible lanes, tunnels, and tollbooths
- For bi-directional roads with more than three vehicular lanes, if vehicular and pedestrian traffic exceeds prescribed minima, a pedestrian signal and a vehicular signal shall be used

Additionally, the standard recommended a few situations, such as intersections within a coordinated light control system, where signals may be placed.

== In other contexts ==
The symbolism of a traffic light (and the meanings of the three primary colors used in traffic lights) is frequently found in many other contexts. Since they are often used as single spots of color without the context of vertical position, they are typically not comprehensible to up to one in ten males who are color blind.

Traffic lights have also been used in computer software, such as the macOS user interface, and in pieces of artwork, particularly Traffic Light Tree in London, UK.

=== Racing ===
Automobile racing circuits can also use standard traffic signals to indicate to racing car drivers the status of the race. On an oval track, four sets may be used, two facing a straight-away and two facing the middle of the 180-degree turn between straight-aways. Green would indicate that racing is underway, while amber would indicate slowing or following a pace car; red would indicate stopping, probably for emergency reasons.

Scuderia Ferrari, a Formula One racing team, formerly used a traffic light system during their pit stops to signal to their drivers when to leave the pits. The red light was on when the tires were being changed. Fuel was being added, amber was on when the tires were changed, and green was on when all work was completed. The system is (usually) completely automatic. However, the system was withdrawn after the 2008 Singapore Grand Prix because it significantly delayed Felipe Massa during the race, when he was in the lead.

Usually, the system was automatic, but heavy traffic in the pit lane forced the team to operate it manually. A mechanic accidentally pressed the green light button when the fuel hose was still attached to the car, causing Massa to drive off, towing the fuel hose along. Additionally, Massa drove into the path of Adrian Sutil, earning him a penalty. He finally stopped at the end of the pit lane, forcing Ferrari's mechanics to sprint down the entire pit lane to remove the hose. As a result of this, and the penalty he also incurred, Massa finished 13th. Ferrari decided to use a traditional "lollipop" for the remainder of the 2008 season.

Another type of traffic light that is used in racing is the Christmas Tree, which is used in drag racing. The Christmas Tree has six lights: a blue staging light, three amber lights, a green light, and a red light. The blue staging light is divided into two parts: Pre-stage and stage. Sometimes, there are two sets of bulbs on top of each other to represent them. Once a driver is staged at the starting line, the starter will activate the light to commence racing, which can be done in two ways. If a Pro tree is used, the three amber lights will flash simultaneously. For the Sportsman tree, the amber light will flash from top to bottom. When the green light comes up, the race officially begins, but if a driver crosses the line before then, a red light will come up, and that will be a foul.

=== As a rating mechanism ===
The colors red, amber, and green are often used as a simple-to-understand rating system for products and processes. It may be extended by analogy to provide a greater range of intermediate colors, with red and green at the extremes.

== In Unicode ==
Unicode has U+1F6A5 🚥 HORIZONTAL TRAFFIC LIGHT and U+1F6A6 🚦 VERTICAL TRAFFIC LIGHT.

== See also ==
- Ampelmännchen
- Glossary of road transport terms
- Induction loop
- Lane control lights
- Level crossing
- Railway signal, rail equivalent
- Pedestrian crossing
- Ramp meter
- Stack light, used in industrial process control
- Traffic light coalition
- Traffic light control and coordination
- Traffic-light signalling and operation
- Traffic optimization
- Traffic robots in Kinshasa
- Slow Children At Play
- Smart traffic light
- Yellow trap
- Split Cycle Offset Optimisation Technique
- Sydney Coordinated Adaptive Traffic System

== Citations ==
- City of Beacon. Canajoharie, New York: Credits. Retrieved 30 September 2008.
- Croton-on-Hudson Historical Society. Canajoharie, New York: Credits. Retrieved 30 September 2008.
- Villages of Canajoharie & Palatine Bridge. Canajoharie, New York: Credits. Retrieved 30 September 2008.
- Sessions, Gordon M. (1971). Traffic devices: historical aspects thereof. Washington: Institute of Traffic Engineers. OCLC 278619.
- Woods, Arthur (April 1916). "Keeping City Traffic Moving: One of the Most Difficult of All City Problems, And The New Methods Which Have Been Devised To Solve It". The World's Work: A History of Our Time. XXXI. Doubleday, Page & Company: 621–532.
