= Slow Children At Play =

Road safety sign

A road sign that reads "slow children"

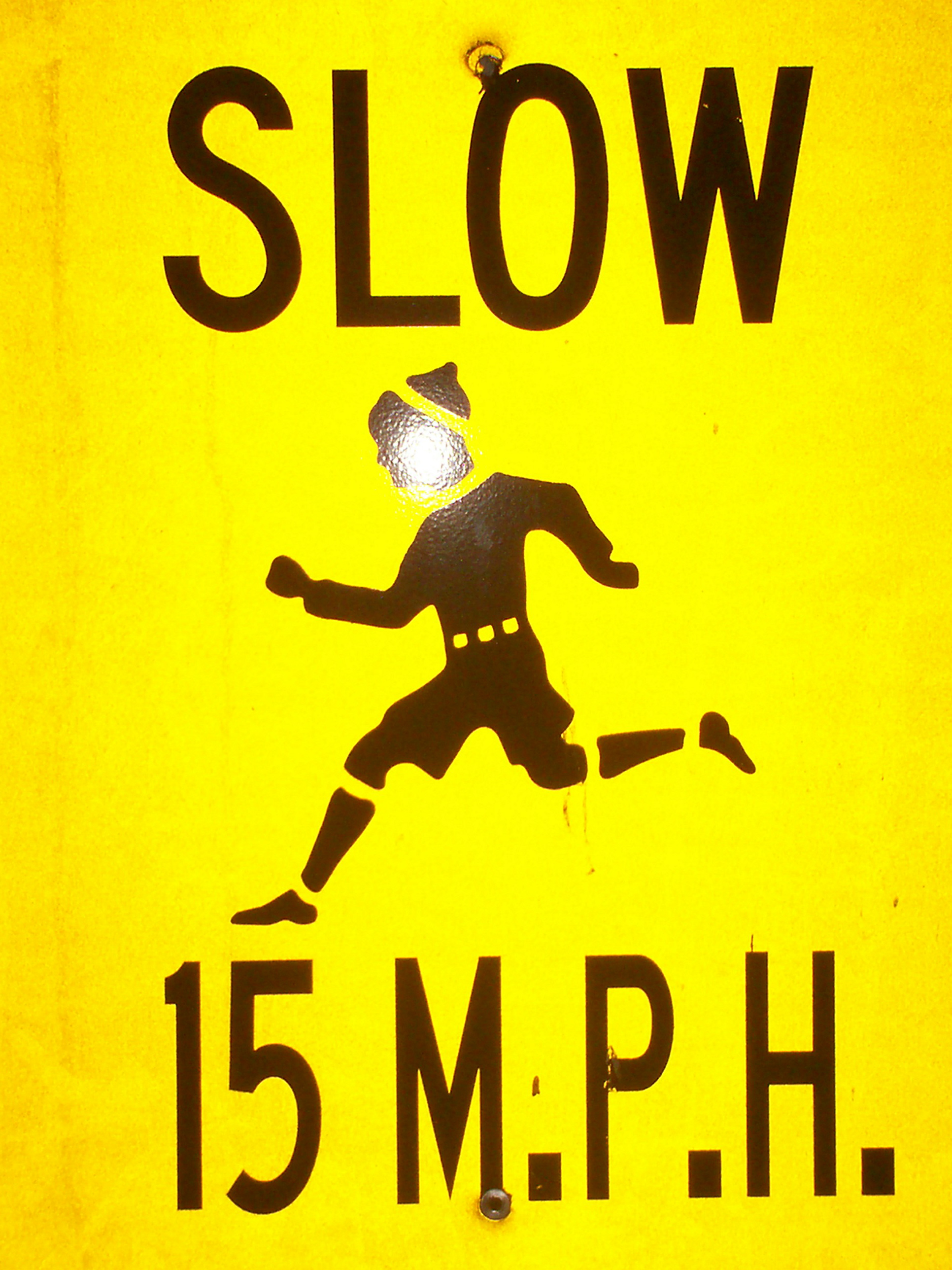
Some "slow children at play" signs just say "Slow"

Slow Children at Play is a street sign in cities of the United States that urges motorists to slow down. They are typically used in areas with children, such as playgrounds and schools. They are characterized by the words Slow Children At Play and a picture of a child running. Some of the signs have a suggested speed limit for when children are present that may not be a regulated legal speed limit but rather a suggested rate. A regulated speed sign is always white with black lettering and the words "Speed Limit" are on the sign. This sign is yellow and is considered an advisory or caution sign.

In a joke considered distasteful or offensive, Slow may be deliberately interpreted to make the sign essentially mean "mentally disabled children at play".

Some municipalities do not post "Children at Play" signs. The website of Montgomery County, Maryland Department of Transportation states: "Children at Play" signs are not approved for use by the "Manual on Uniform Traffic Control Devices", the national standard for traffic control signs. The generic message of these signs does not command sufficient motorists attention since motorists are generally aware of the increased possibility of children playing in adjacent yards and sidewalks when they are driving on any residential street.

"Children at Play" signs are inappropriate for public streets since they convey the suggestion that playing on the street is acceptable behavior, which it is not. Additionally, the installation of this sign may lead parents and children to believe they have an added degree of protection which these signs do not provide.
