= Cyclops (disambiguation) =

A Cyclops is a one-eyed monster in Greek mythology.

Cyclops or The Cyclops may also refer to:

== Arts and entertainment ==
=== Literature ===
- Cyclops (play), by Euripides
- Cyclops (novel), a Dirk Pitt novel by Clive Cussler
- Cyclops (Marvel Comics), a Marvel Comics superhero
- Cyclops (magazine), a British underground comics magazine of the 1970s
- Cyclops, a comic poem by Philoxenus of Cythera
- Cyclops, an organization in David Brin's novel The Postman

=== Film and television ===
- The Cyclops (film), a 1957 American science fiction film
- Cyclops (1976 film), a Bulgarian film
- Cyclops (1982 film), a Croatian film
- Cyclops (1987 film), a Japanese science fiction horror film
- Cyclops (2008 film), an American fantasy film
- Cyclops, a character in the TV series Xiaolin Showdown
- Cyclops, a character in the TV series Mahou Sentai Magiranger
- Cyclops, the bus in the film The Big Bus

=== Games ===
- Cyclops (Dungeons & Dragons), a giant in the role-playing game Dungeons & Dragons
- Cyclops, a unit in the video game Halo Wars
- Kyklops (Devil May Cry), a demon appearing in Devil May Cry

=== Music ===
- Cyclops (album), by Terminal Power Company
- "Cyclops", a song from Portrait of an American Family by Marilyn Manson
- "Cyclops", a song from The Libertines by the Libertines

=== Other ===
- The Cyclops (Redon), an 1898 painting by Odilon Redon
- Cyclops (roller coaster), at Mt. Olympus Water & Theme Park, Wisconsin Dells, Wisconsin, U.S.

== Science and technology ==
- Cromemco Cyclops, first commercial all-digital camera using a digital MOS area image sensor
- Cyclops (computer system), an automated line-calling system in tennis
- Cyclops (copepod), a genus of copepods (crustaceans)
- Cyclops laser, a high-power laser built in 1975
- Cyclops (rock), a type of agate
- Project Cyclops, a NASA proposal for an Earth-based radio telescope array

== In the military ==
- HMS Cyclops, four ships of the Royal Navy
- Cyclops-class monitor, four Royal Navy monitors built in the 1870s
- USS Cyclops, a U.S. Navy Proteus-class collier of World War I
- USS Kickapoo (1864), later the Cyclops, a Union Navy ship of the American Civil War
- Huff-Daland XHB-1, an American 1920s prototype heavy bomber nicknamed "Cyclops"
- Cyclops Airfield, an American World War II airfield in Papua New Guinea - see Sentani International Airport

== Transportation ==
- SS Cyclops (1906), a British cargo steamship
- Cyclops, a West Cornwall Railway steam locomotive
- Cyclops, a nickname for DM 556, an NZR DM class unit on the rail passenger network of Wellington, New Zealand
- Cyclops, a nickname for the British Rail Class 67 Locomotive
- Cyclops 1, a submersible vessel built by OceanGate

== Businesses ==
- Cyclops Steel, a former steel company based in Pittsburgh, Pennsylvania, U.S.
- Cyclops (toy company), an Australian manufacturer of toys

== Places ==
- Cyclops Mountains, Papua province, Indonesia
- Cyclops Peak, Enderby Land, Antarctica

== Other uses ==
- SouthWest Cyclops, a Canadian professional indoor lacrosse team
- Cyclops, a Ku Klux Klan position title
- A CYCLOPS junction, a certain kind of protected intersection

== See also ==
- Cyclops64, an IBM supercomputer architecture
- Cyclopes (disambiguation)
- Cyclopia, a birth defect
- Cyclopsitta, a genus of parrot
- PSYCHLOPS, a type of psychological testing
- List of one-eyed creatures in mythology and fiction
