= Terminal Power Company =

- Origin: Birmingham, England, UK
- Genres: Cyberpunk; Alternative rock
- Years active: 1989–1995
- Labels: Situation Two; Beggars Banquet; Stay Free Records
- Members: Paul Aspel; John Roome
- Past members: Mark McKenzie – bass; Dave Askey – bass; Le-antoni Haggerty (aka "Snap") – drums; Simon Coleby – keyboards

Terminal Power Company was a British alternative music band.

== History ==
Formed in 1989 in Birmingham, England, by Paul Aspel and John Roome, designed specifically to be a "cyberpunk band", the band cited many diverse visual influences on their music. Amongst these were William Gibson, John Shirley - Authors, Blade Runner, Aliens, Spaghetti Westerns and Film Noir. Essentially the band was formed to create virtual sound tracks for these types of films and books. Their first demo tapes were received well and in early 1990 TPC signed to Situation Two and soon released their first single "Wired" (SIT 80).

Following the release of "Wired" they signed a three-album contract with Beggars Banquet Records. The band spent two weeks during November 1990 recording their first album Run Silent, Run Deep, which was released in early 1991 and was well received by the press. The album was soon followed by the single "The Hunger, The Heat", and later that year the second single from the album, "Salvation". The version released was a remix of the album version and featured a drummer and additional extra guitar performed by Mark Gemini Thwaite, most recently known for being a member of The Mission.

During the period directly after the recording of Run Silent, Run Deep, Aspel and Roome decided to expand the line up of the band to a four-piece. Up to this point, they had played as a three-piece with Mark McKenzie on bass and were using a backing tape for drums and keyboards. They felt that the adding of a full-time drummer and bass player would fill out the sound and make the group have a proper "band" feel on stage.

Through the band's tour manager, John Adkins, Aspel and Roome were introduced to Dave Askey, former bassist with Goth rockers "Dawn after Dark". Askey was quickly introduced to the band's material and after a short period of rehearsal and gigging the band entered the studio to record their second album, Red Skin Eclipse.

The album was recorded during November 1992 at the Rich Bitch recording studio in Selly Oak, Birmingham, UK, taking four weeks to record and mix and was co-produced by Godflesh guitarist and songwriter Justin Broadrick.

Prior to the release of their second album, the band brought in Stourbridge-based drummer Lee Haggerty.

The band expected the album to be released in March 1993, however, the record label decided to delay release until the following October.

During the summer of 1993 the band decided to remix some of the tracks from the new album with ON-U sound producer Adrian Sherwood at the Roundhouse recording studio. The sessions were also added to with contributions from Tackhead guitarist, Skip McDonald.

From the results of this session the track listing on Red Skin Eclipse was altered to include the remixed version of "Juggernaut". This track was later to be released as the band's fourth single.

The band continued touring, headlining and supporting other acts but were dropped by their record label during March 1994. They then signed to Leicester-based Stay Free Records.

The band's final album, Cyclops, was released in summer 1995 and featured Shane Embury from Napalm Death on two tracks: "Soft White Underside" and "Cyclops". The album was not as successful as the band had hoped and the band dissolved during November of that year.

== Discography ==
=== Albums ===
- Run Silent, Run Deep (SITU 38) (1991)
- Red Skin Eclipse (BBQ CD 139) (1993)
- Cyclops (STAY009 CD) (1995)

=== Singles ===
- "Wired" (SIT 80) (1991)
- "The Hunger, the Heat" (SIT 92) (1992)
- "Salvation" (SIT 98) (1992)
- "Juggernaut" (BBQ 17CD) (1993)

Other appearances

- Deafening Divinities with Aural Affinities - The Beggars Banquet Collection - "Splinterpsyche" (Beggars Banquet, 1993)
- The Beggars Banquet Collection - "Splinterpsyche" (Tokuma Japan Communications, 1993)
- New Releases Autumn 1991 - "Wired" (SPV Recordings, 1991)
- Gothic Rock - "Burning Chrome (Mk I)" (Jungle Records, 1992)
- Music from the Empty Quarter: Ghafran - "Automek" (T.E.Q. Music, 1993)
- F**kin' Hardfloor Volumes 1 & 2 - "Into Two" (Atomic Magazine, 1995)

== Other information ==
- Videos for "The Hunger the Heat" and "Salvation" were seen on various TV programmes, notably on MTV Europe.
