= Red Skin Eclipse =

Studio album by Terminal Power Company
- Released: 1993
- Recorded: November–December 1992; Rich Bitch Studio's
- Genre: Cyberpunk; alternative rock; industrial
- Length: 47:20
- Label: Beggars Banquet
- Producer: Justin Broadrick

Terminal Power Company chronology
Run Silent, Run Deep (1992)	Red Skin Eclipse (1993)	Cyclops (1995)

Red Skin Eclipse is the second full-length album by British industrial/alternative band Terminal Power Company. Released by Beggars Banquet Records, the album was recorded in November and December 1992 at Rich Bitch Studios and was produced and mixed by Justin Broadrick. Also involved were producer Adrian Sherwood who mixed the track "Juggernaut" and Paul Kendall who mixed part of the song "Blanket Drill Doll".

== Track listing ==
1. "Juggernaut" - 4:01
2. "Red Skin" - 3:42
3. "Splinterpsyche" - 3:27
4. "The Sprawl" - 7:23
5. "Painkiller" - 3:43
6. "Mouth Like a Scar" - 3:57
7. "A.G.G.R.O." - 4:38
8. "White Light" - 4:00
9. "Blanket Drill Doll" - 12:26

== Personnel ==
- Paul Aspel
- John Roome
