= Run Silent, Run Deep (disambiguation) =

Run Silent, Run Deep is a 1955 novel by Edward L. Beach, Jr.

Run Silent, Run Deep may also refer to:

== Film and television ==
- Run Silent, Run Deep (film) a 1958 black-and-white film based loosely on the book
- "Run Silent, Run Deep" (CSI: NY episode)
- "Run Silent, Run Deep", an episode of Martian Successor Nadesico
- "Run Silent, Run Deep", and episode of the Netflix series Gamera Rebirth

== Music ==
- Run Silent, Run Deep (album), an album by Terminal Power Company
- "Run Silent" or "Run Silent, Run Deep", a song by Shakespear's Sister from Sacred Heart
- "Run Silent, Run Deep", a song by Iron Maiden from No Prayer for the Dying
- "Run Silent, Run Deep", a song by Peter Wolf from Come as You Are
- "Run Silent, Run Deep", a song by Raven from All for One

== See also ==
- Silent Running (disambiguation)
