= Right-hook accident =

Traffic accident where a turning motor vehicle hits a pedestrian or cyclist

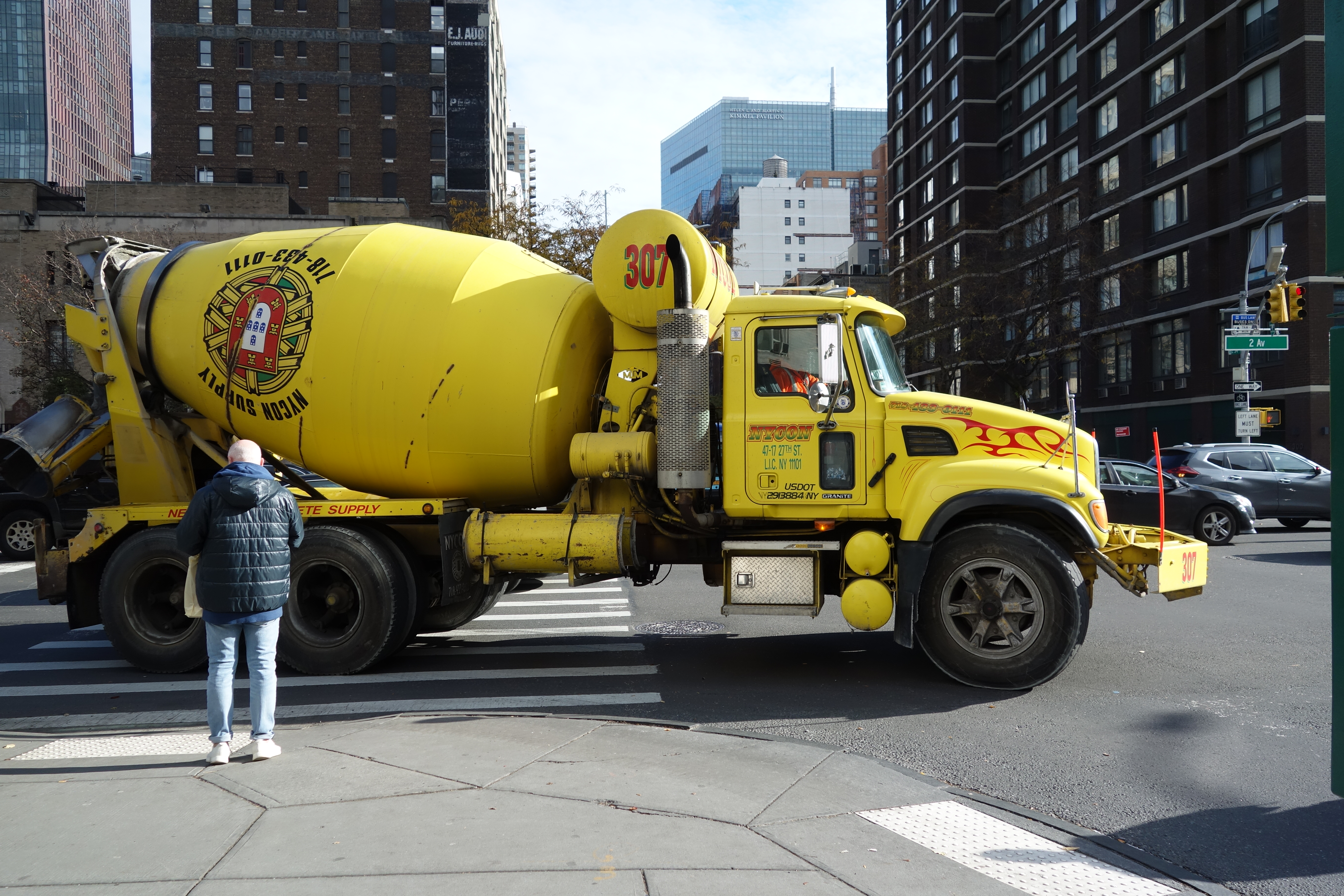
Truck turning right

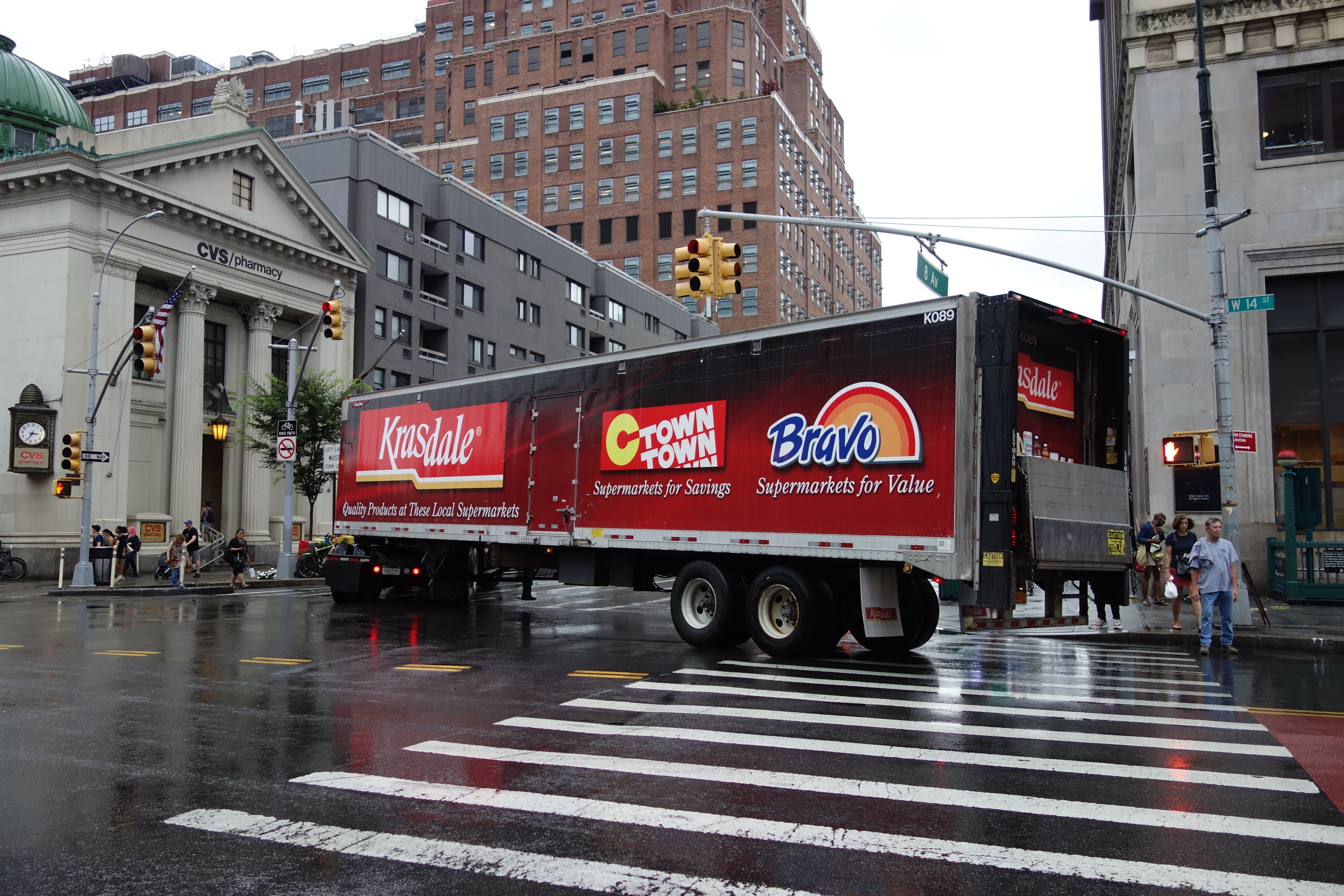
Semi-trailer turning right

In places with right hand driving, a right-hook accident is a type of traffic collision in which a motor vehicle makes a right turn and hits a pedestrian or cyclist. It is a common type of blind spot accident, and occurs at intersections, roundabouts and on turnaround spots, among other places.

It is a common myth that women are more often victims of right-turn accidents.

== History ==
In Denmark, the media and sometimes politicians, especially after the turn of the millennium, have focused on right-turn accidents where truck drivers have run over cyclists. This has led to the fact that after 2005 Danish trucks must be equipped with at least three mirrors, which—if correctly adjusted—should be able to eliminate all blind spots on the right side of the vehicle where non-motorists usually travel. However, statistics have shown that the mirror requirements have not reduced the number of deaths due to right-turn accidents.

== Mortality ==
Right-turn accidents are associated with serious injuries, and in particular accidents involving trucks have a high mortality rate. Collisions between cars and vulnerable road users (pedestrians or cyclists) are often referred to as "collisions", while collisions with trucks in right-turn accidents are often characterized as complete or partial run-overs. In truck accidents, 80% die at the scene due to extensive crushing injuries, often involving multiple body regions. The potential for saving human lives by optimizing treatment options is therefore modest, just as the use of bicycle helmets rarely can prevent the fatal outcome of these types of accidents.

== Factors ==
Drivers running red lights can be a cause of right-turn accidents. Cycling through red lights, on the other hand, can be a strategy for cyclists to get in front of large vehicles, thus getting out of blind spots and preventing right-turn accidents.

Another enabling factor for such accidents is if the cyclist positions themself to the side of the road or lane so that drivers of motor vehicles have the opportunity to drive up to their side. This can be done, for example, when using bike lanes if these are without protection towards intersections, or when cycling with cars in the roadway if the cyclist positions themself extremely close to the shoulder of the road. These factors can be addressed by encouraging cyclists to move more into the middle of the lane, for example by using a shared lane marking, which thus can prevent dangerous overtaking so that cyclists end up in blind spots.

== Prevention ==
A protected intersection can be used to create a physical barrier in places where collisions would normally occur, and provide new crossing points where pedestrians and cyclists are clearly visible to motor vehicle drivers. However, in places where protected intersections do not exist, other solutions must be considered.

It has been suggested that cyclists should receive courses where they learn how to make themselves visible in traffic, but although the proposal may seem sensible, it is not very realistic.

Another proposal has been that cyclists should ride on the left side of the road (similar to the recommendation that pedestrians walk on the opposite side of cyclists on shared-use paths) so that cyclists meet motorists head-on. It is uncertain how many corresponding left-turn accidents this would result in.

In practice, drivers have been left to take responsibility for the problem, for instance by introducing requirements for mirrors, blind spot cameras and fine increases. Visions of the future have also been presented of cars becoming smarter, for example, so that they can brake themselves to prevent right-turn accidents. From July 2024, the European Union's General Safety Regulation (GSR) mandates new trucks and buses, being equipped with safety systems to reduce blind spots and detect vulnerable road users like cyclists and pedestrians.

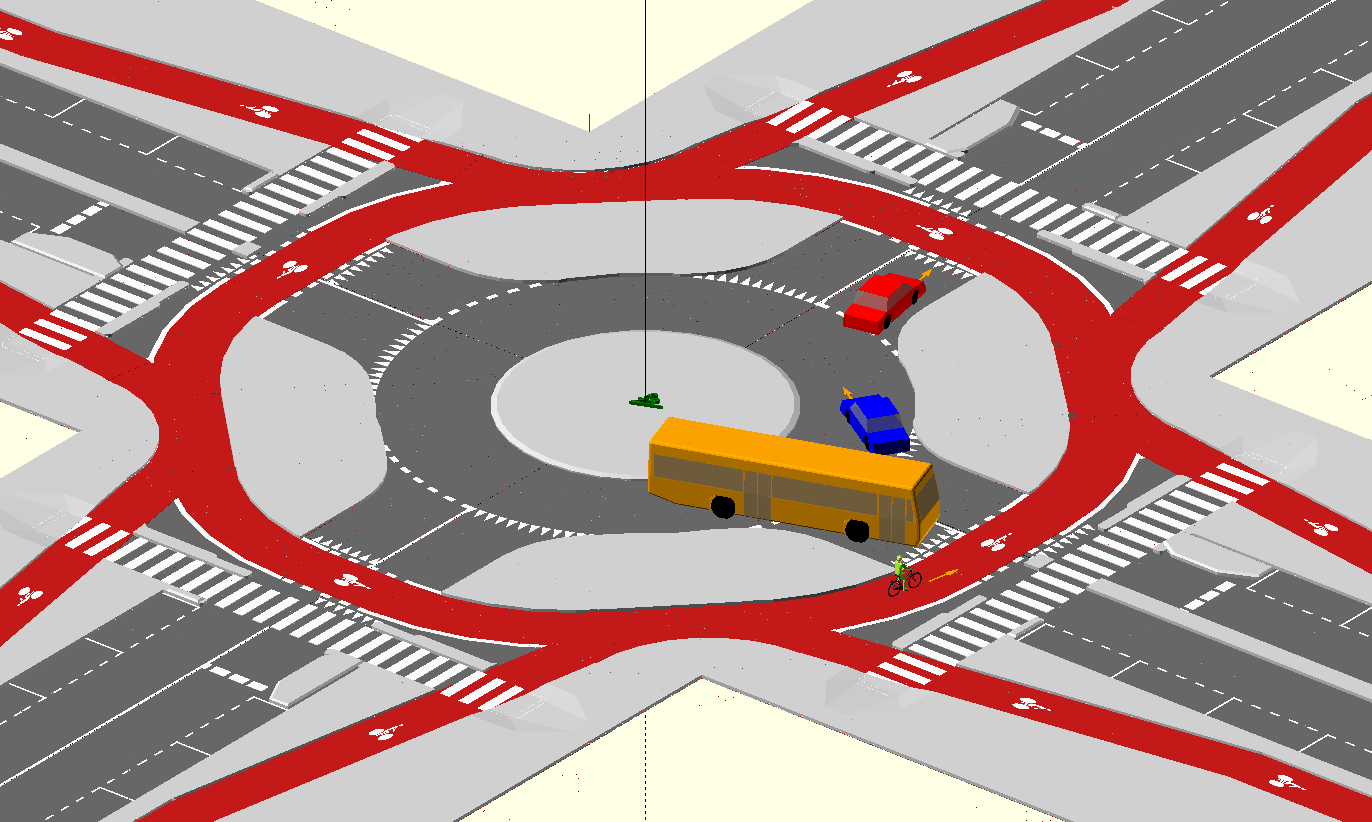
Protected roundabout of the type used in the Netherlands

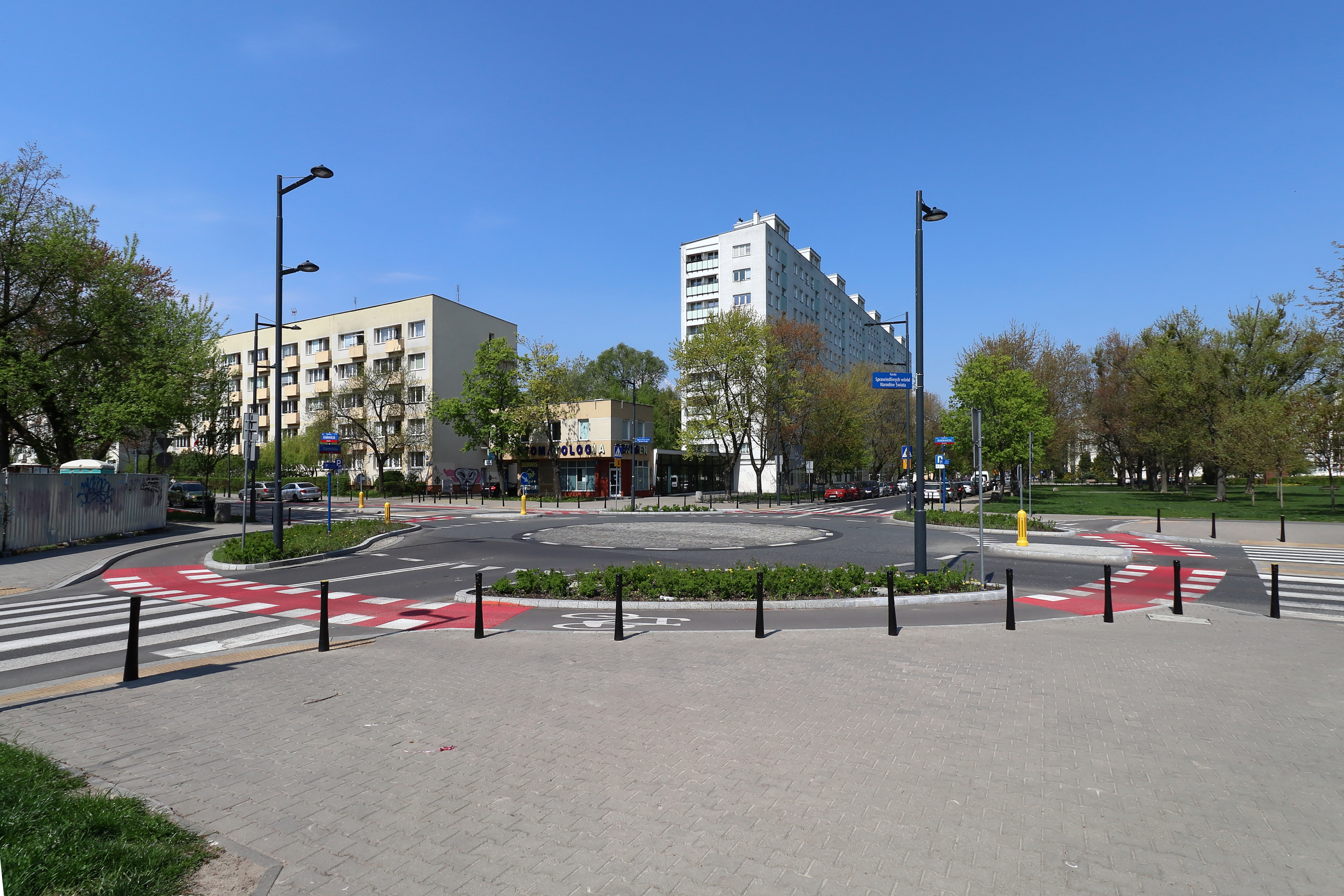
A protected roundabout in Poland

== See also ==
- Car dependency, urban planning that favors cars over cycling, public transport and walking
- Ghost bike, roadside memorial for traffic fatalities
- Non-motorist, road user who is not protected by a surrounding collision protection system, and is thus more vulnerable in the event of a traffic collision
- Protected intersection, a road intersection where cyclists and pedestrians are separated from motorists to prevent collisions
- Vision Zero, international goal of no fatalities or serious injuries in traffic
