= Cyclopes (disambiguation) =

The Cyclopes are a group of one-eyed giants in Greek mythology.

- Cyclops
- Cyclops (disambiguation)

Cyclopes may also refer to:

- The genus Cyclopes, containing the species silky anteater

== See also ==
- Cyclops (disambiguation)
