= Dismal Mountains =

Nunataks in Enderby Land, Antarctica

Coordinates: 68°5′S 55°25′E

The Dismal Mountains are a group of nunataks about 35 miles (56 km) southwest of Rayner Peak in Antarctica. They were photographed from ANARE (Australian National Antarctic Research Expeditions) aircraft in 1956, and surveyed by G.A. Knuckey during a dog-sledge journey from Amundsen Bay to Mawson Station in December 1958. They are so named because the mountains are frequently shrouded in clouds.

== See also ==
- Cyclops Peak
