= Silent Running (disambiguation) =

Silent Running is a 1972 science fiction film. There was also a novelization with the same title.

Silent Running may also refer to:

== Music ==
- Silent Running (band), a Northern Irish rock band
- Silent Running (album), a 2011 album by 65daysofstatic, an alternate soundtrack for the 1972 film
- "Silent Running (On Dangerous Ground)", a 1985 song by Mike + The Mechanics
- "Silent Running", a song by Carbon Based Lifeforms from Hydroponic Garden
- "Silent Running", a song by Gorillaz featuring Adeleye Omotayo from Cracker Island
- "Silent Running", a song by the Korgis from Dumb Waiters
- "Silent Running", a song by Orchestral Manoeuvres in the Dark from Dazzle Ships
- "Silent Running", a song by Sandra Cretu from The Wheel of Time
- "Silent Running", a track by Klaus Schulze from Trancefer, inspired by the 1972 film

== Military navy ==
- Silent running (submarine), a stealth mode of operation for submarines
- Silent Running: My Years on a World War II Attack Submarine, a memoir by U.S. Vice Admiral James F. Calvert

== See also ==
- Run Silent, Run Deep (disambiguation)
