= Hook turn =

Road-vehicular manoeuvre for turning across lanes of opposing traffic

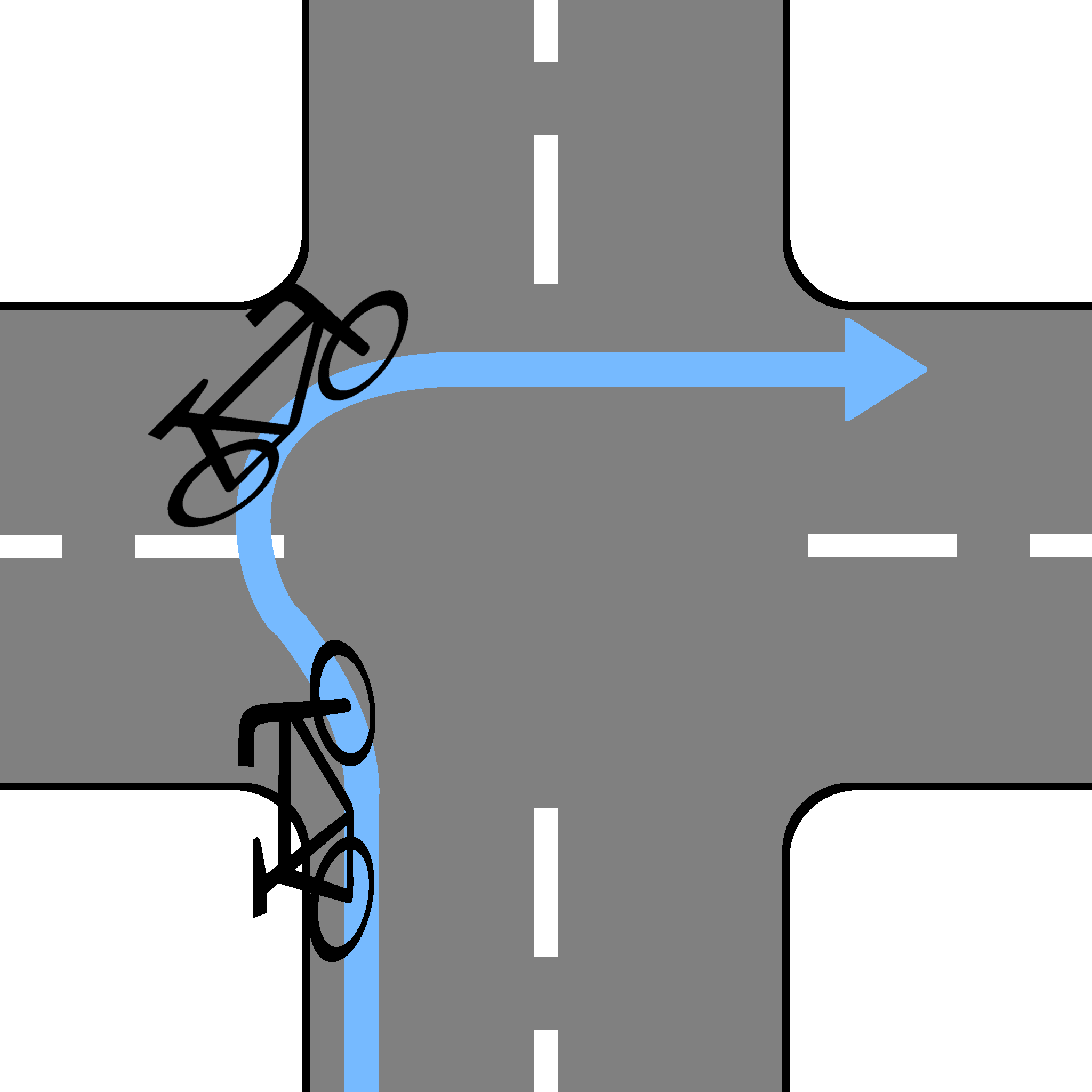
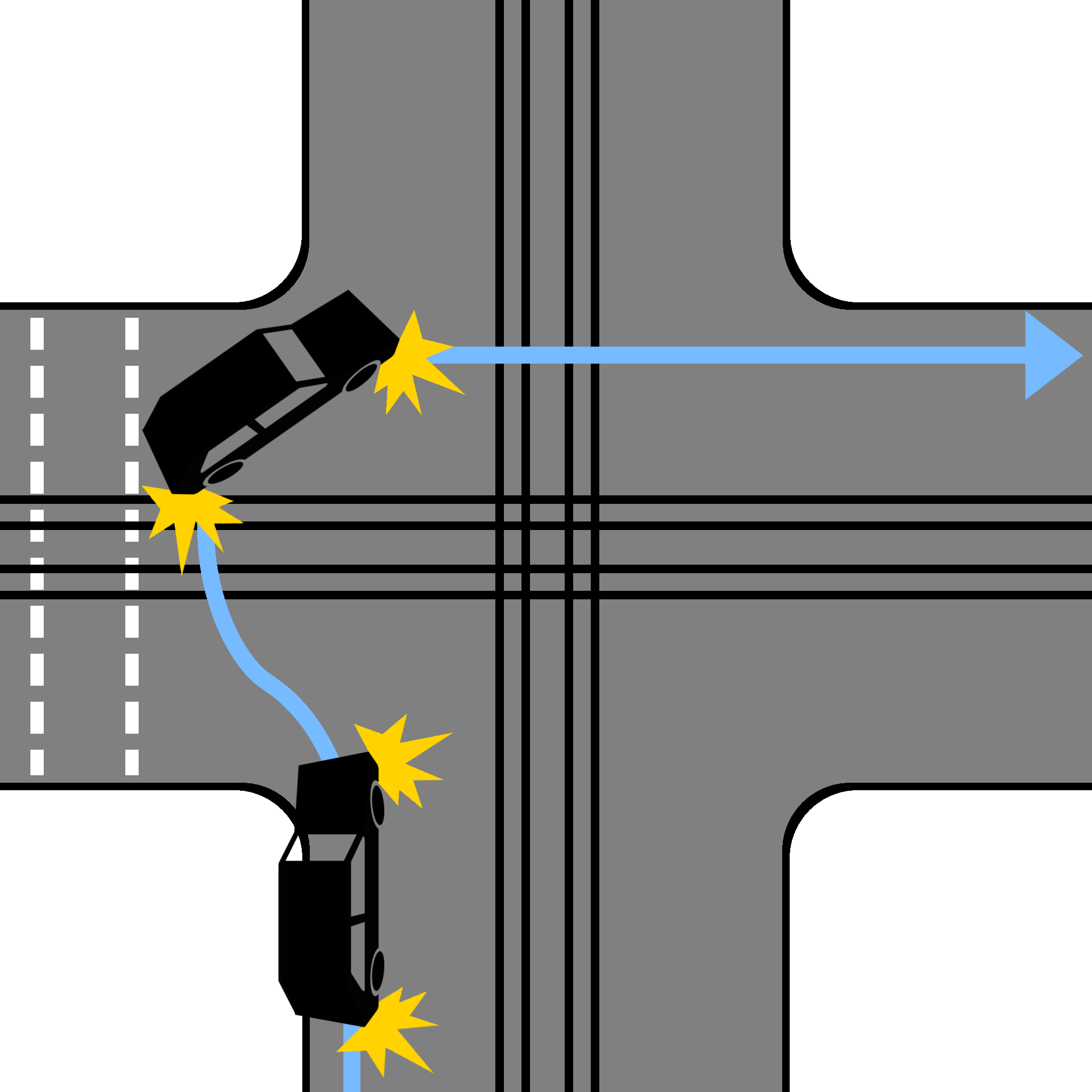
A hook turn (in left-handed traffic) using a bicycle (first diagram) or a motor vehicle (second diagram, with dark lines representing tram tracks)

A hook turn (Australian English) or two-stage turn (British English), also known as a Copenhagen Left (in reference to cyclists specifically and in countries with right-handed traffic), is a road cycling manoeuvre or a motor vehicle traffic-control mechanism in which vehicles that would normally turn from the innermost lane of an intersection instead turn from the outermost lane, across all other lanes of traffic.

Hook turns are commonly used by cyclists as a safer alternative to merging with motor vehicles, or having to cross multiple lanes of traffic to reach a turning lane.

The legal use of hook turns by motor vehicles is relatively rare, but has been implemented in some jurisdictions (notably Melbourne, Australia) to keep the centre of a road free from congestion for use by light rail transit such as trams or other dedicated road services.

== History ==
Hook turns were originally the standard right turn in Australia. Various jurisdictions phased them out at different times. Sydney and Newcastle changed to centre turns in 1939. South Australia discontinued the hook turn on 30 November 1950. Victoria changed to centre turns in 1954 for all right turns except at some intersections in the Melbourne CBD, where hook turns were retained to maintain a clearway in the centre of the road for the city's trams. Requiring vehicles to turn from the far lane, rather than the middle of the road, avoided conflicts between vehicles and trams without the need for extra traffic lanes or altered signals.

== Method ==
To perform a two-stage turn, cyclists should enter the junction when given a green signal (simultaneous with motor traffic, though nearside turning traffic may be held at a red light). The farside-turning cyclist should pull into the nearside in front of the pedestrian crossing (in a marked waiting area, if available). When the side road is given a green signal, cyclists should proceed first by going straight ahead, completing their turn.

== Usage by country ==
Hook turns have been implemented in a number of jurisdictions, including Australia, China, Denmark, Germany, Japan, the Netherlands, New Zealand, Taiwan, and the United States.

=== Australia ===
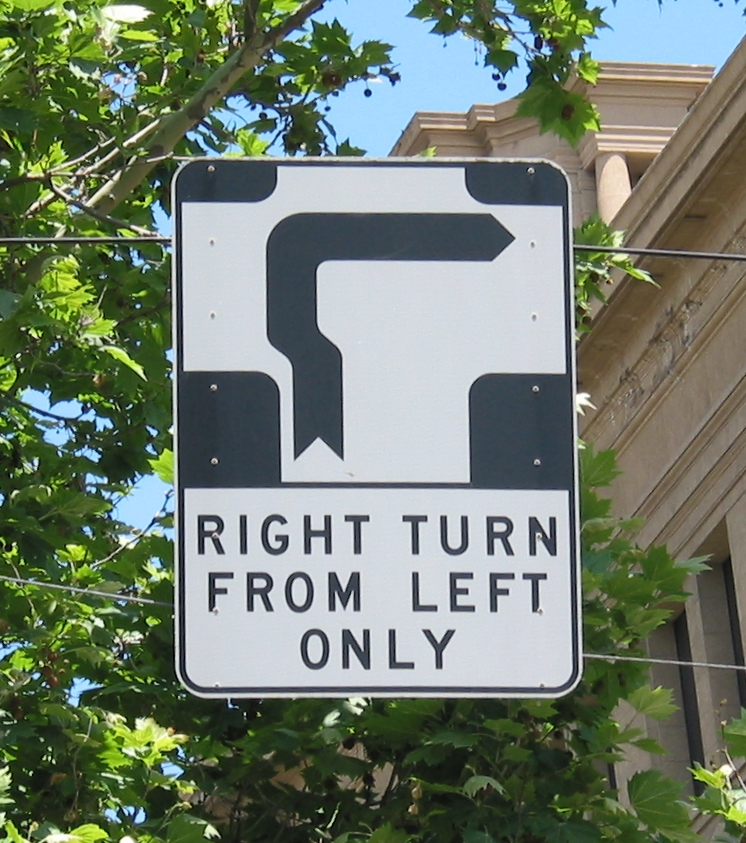
Hook turn sign in Melbourne

The Australian Road Rules set out the procedure for performing a hook turn in Australia, as well as other jurisdictions with left-hand traffic. In jurisdictions with right-hand traffic the lane of the turning vehicle is reversed.

1. When the traffic light is green, the turning vehicle approaches and enters the intersection from as near as possible to the left. If there is insufficient room then it must wait for the next cycle of the lights.
2. The vehicle moves forward, keeping clear of any marked foot crossing, until it is as near as possible to the left-most lane of the road the vehicle is entering.
3. The vehicle remains at this position until the traffic lights on the road it is entering change to green.
4. The vehicle then turns right into the road and continues straight ahead.

In many jurisdictions, lightweight vehicles, such as bicycles and mopeds, may make hook turns at any intersection regardless of signage. For instance, under the Australian Road Rules cyclists may legally perform a hook turn at any intersection unless otherwise signed.

=== Canada ===
Toronto and Montreal have bicycle facilities that allow cyclists to perform perimeter-style turns, as such turns are known in Canada.

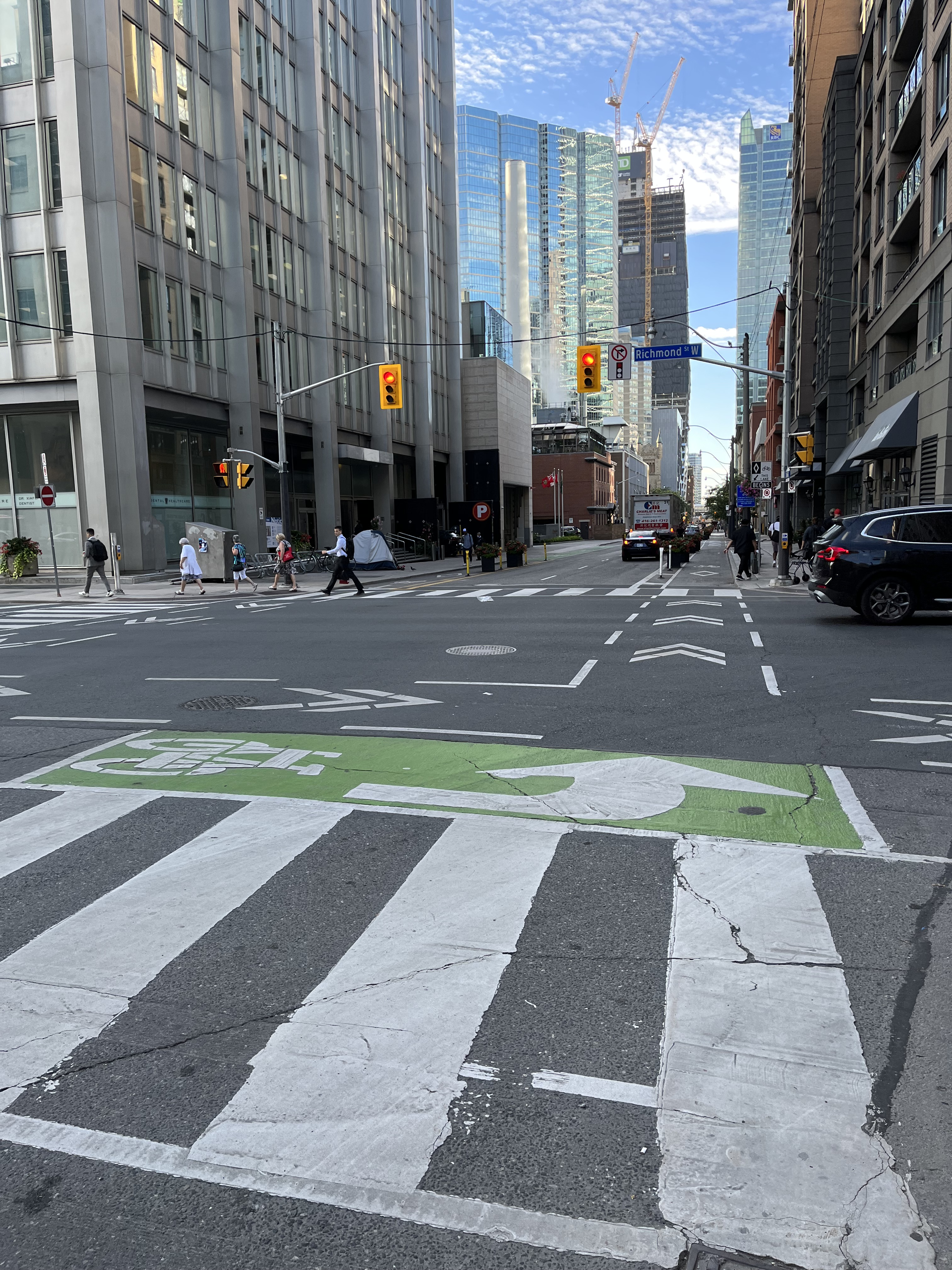
perimeter-style turn for bicycles in Toronto, Canada

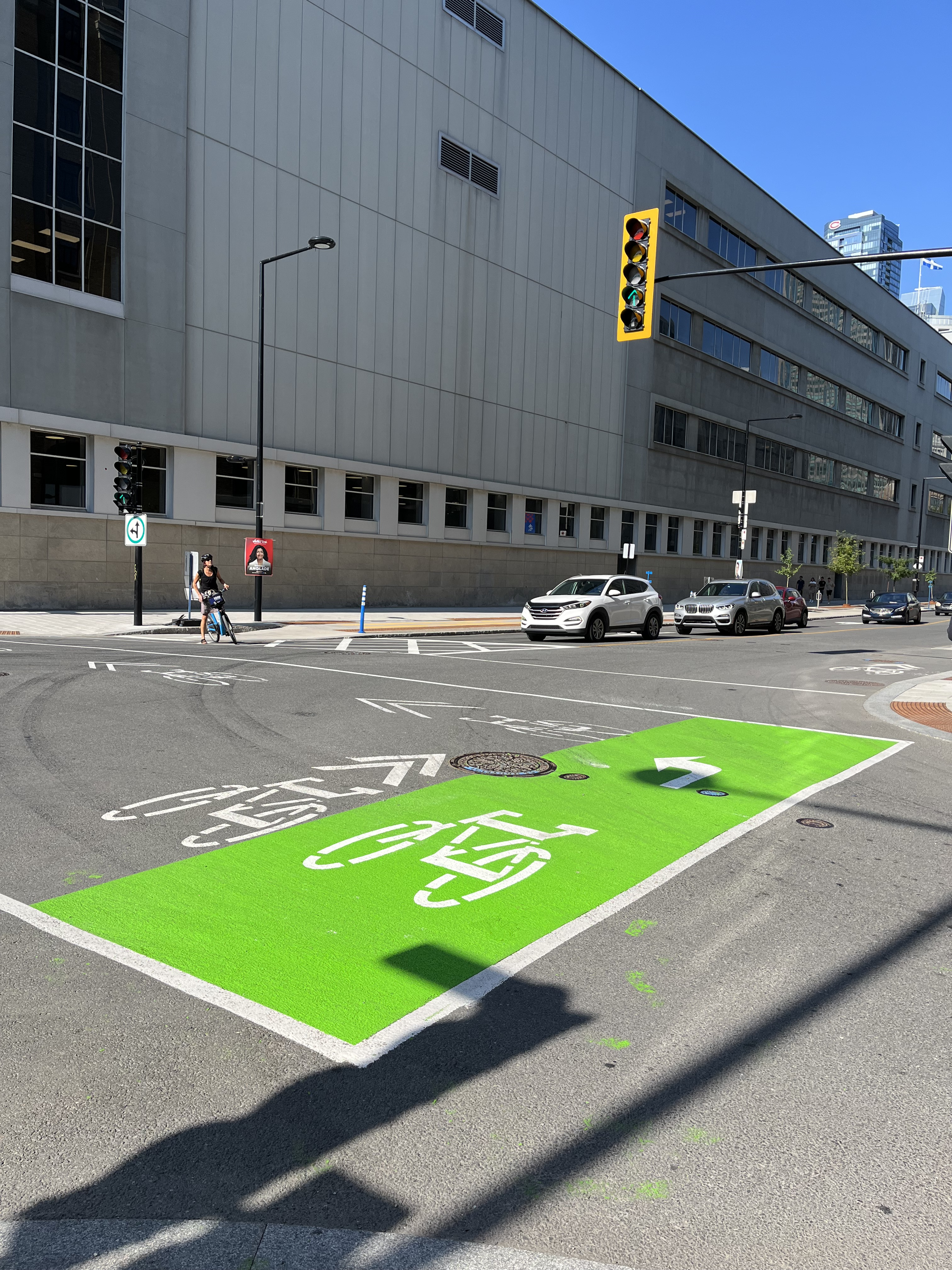
Bicycle perimeter-style turn in Montreal

=== Denmark ===
In Denmark, a hook turn is mandatory for cyclists. Denmark drives on the right and cyclists wishing to make a left turn must first proceed through the intersection to the opposite side of the perpendicular street, then make the turn from the new destination. To avoid conflicts with cars turning right, a cyclist wishing to make a left turn is - if a car lane is expressly marked as "right turn only" allowed to place himself on the left side of that lane.

=== Japan ===
A Japanese sign directing motorized bicycles to make a two-stage right turn.

Hook turns are known as two-stage right turns (ni-dankai usetsu 二段階右折) in Japan, where they were mandated for all vehicles and animals on public roads from 1920 until 1947. They were re-instituted for certain light vehicles in 1960 and remain mandatory for bicycles and motorized bicycles (including motor scooters under 50cc), unless a road sign or police officer directs otherwise.

A Japanese sign prohibiting motorized bicycles from making two-stage turns.

Some Japanese intersections are equipped with dedicated shoulders or traffic signals for two-stage right turns, while some have signage directing motorized bicycles to make right turns like ordinary automobiles (while regular bicycles are still required to make two-stage right turns).

=== New Zealand ===
In New Zealand, hook turns are occasionally marked on roads and used by cyclists. Notably in Wellington, such as at Lambton Quay, Bowen St, and Whitmore St intersection, near The Beehive.

=== Taiwan ===
Scooter direction sign in Taiwan

Motor scooters and motorcycles under 250cc are generally not permitted to turn left from the left lane in Taiwan, with hook turns required at most intersections. The first hook turn requirement for motorcycles began in Taipei in 1985. However, as motorcycle riders were found to frequently enter the zebra crossing when performing hook turn maneuvers, the Ministry of Transportation and Communications announced on 21 April 2023 that it would partially phase out hook turn regulations. Tainan City ended hook turn requirements at several intersections as part of a six-month trial program in October 2023, and will end hook turn regulations citywide by the end of 2025. Changhua County started gradually ending hook turn regulations in November 2024.

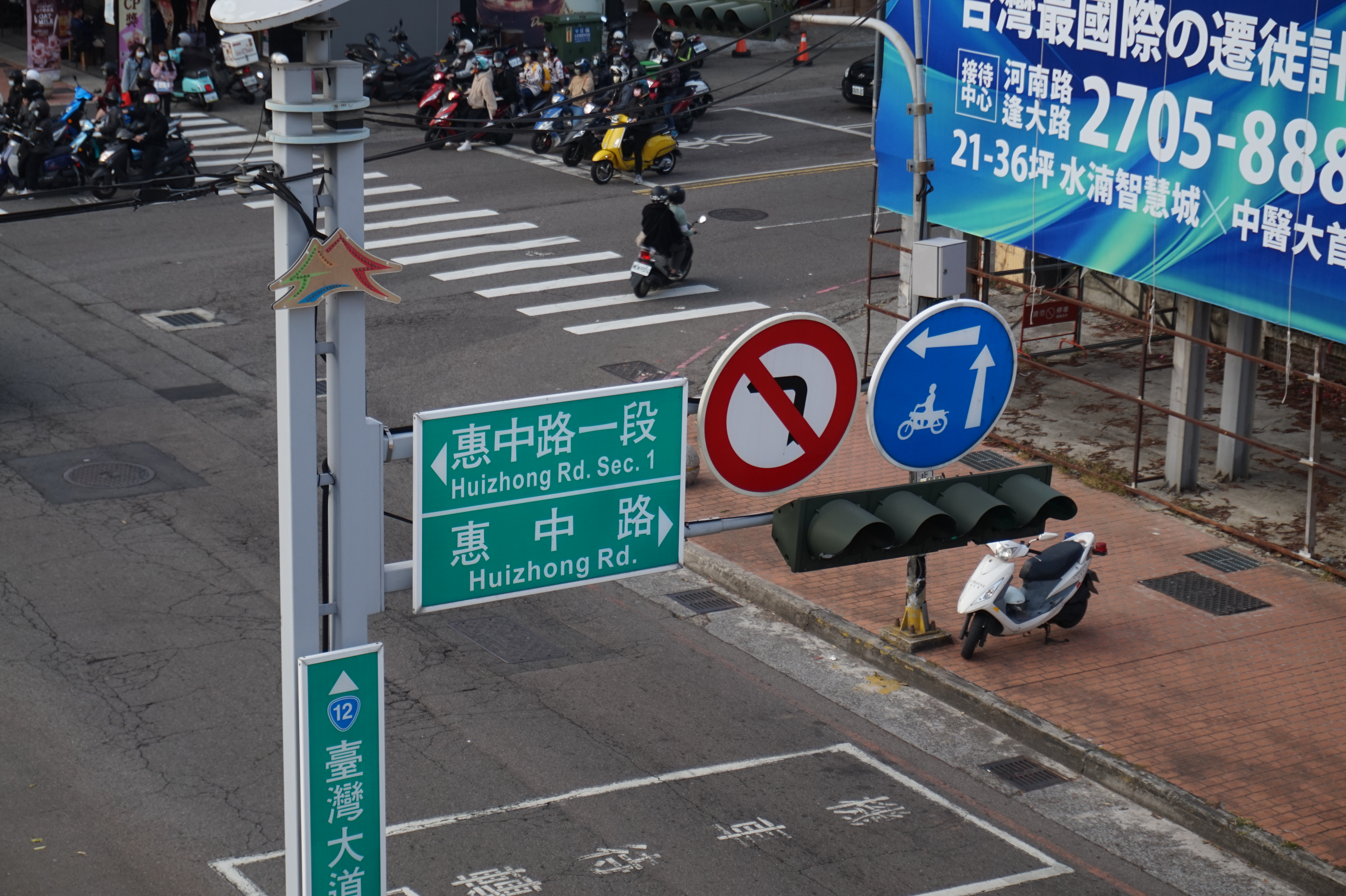
Hook turn sign in Taichung, Taiwan. Note the motorcycles at the end of the intersection

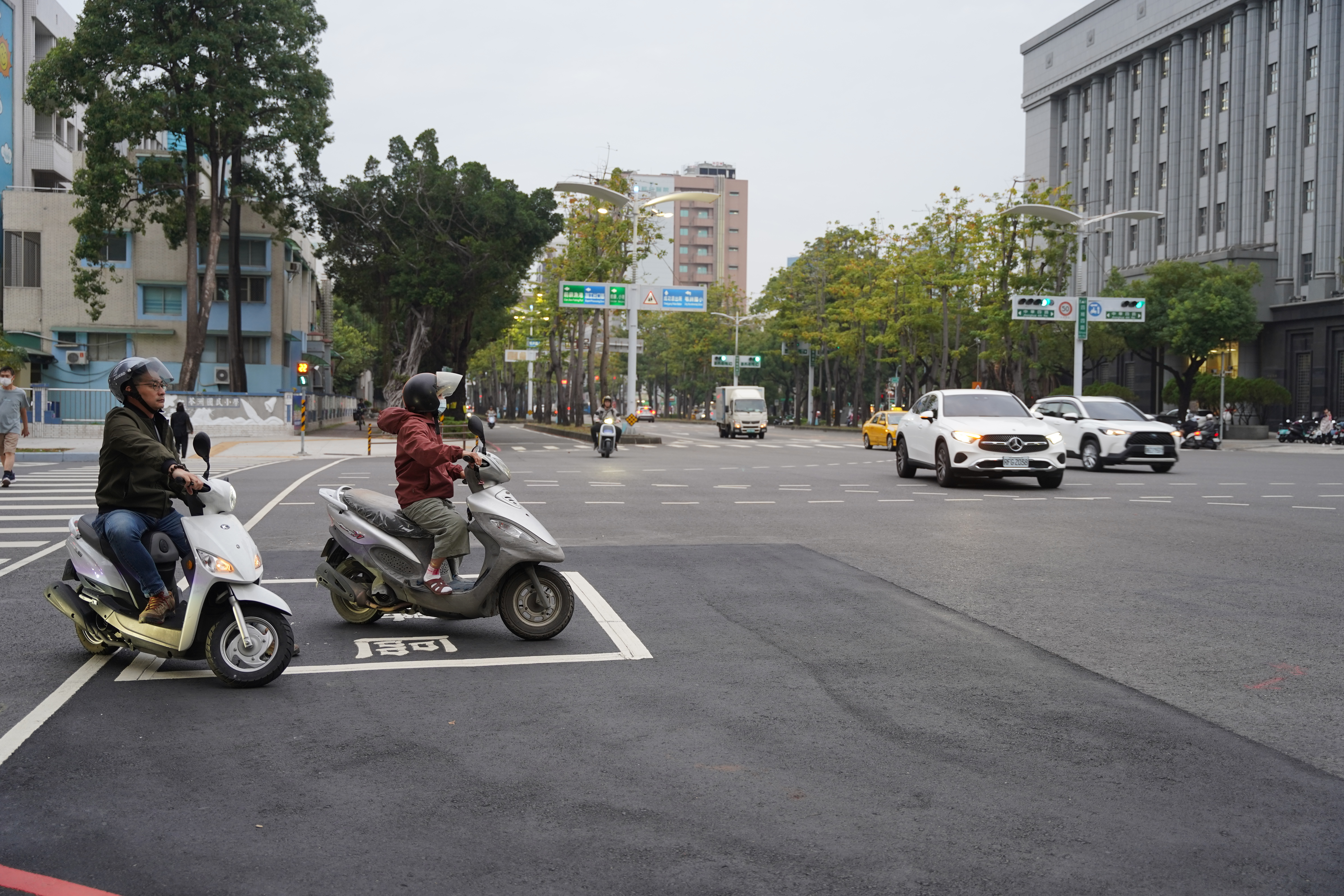
Scooters waiting for the traffic signal within a dedicated hook turn zone marked as a white rectangle, in Kaohsiung

Motorcycle two-stage left turn exemption sign in the Reference Guidelines for the Establishment of Road Traffic Signs, Markings, and Signals published by the Ministry of Transportation and Communications

Common bilingual (Chinese and English) motorcycle two-stage left turn exemption sign in Taipei City

=== United Kingdom ===
Two-stage turn arrangements enable cyclists to turn right (across oncoming traffic) without needing to move to the centre of the carriageway. A two-stage turn is considered acceptable in LTN 1/20, England and Northern Ireland's cycle infrastructure design guide, and in Scotland's Cycling by Design guidance.

A blue (informatory) sign can be placed to advise cyclists a two-stage turn is possible, and appropriate markings in front of the nearside approach lane. Furthermore, with authorisation by national governments, signs can be added to traffic lights to ban right turns for cyclists, unless completed in two stages.

== Benefits ==
There have been limited proposals for hook turns to be implemented as a more widespread replacement for conventional intersection turns. Computer modelling has indicated that hook turns have the potential to significantly reduce delays and congestion in most situations, especially where overall traffic flow is high.

On average, a tram will save 11 to 16 seconds when going through an intersection that uses hook turns.

== Limitations ==
Two-stage turns are often considered less preferable for cyclist safety than protected junctions, as there is more cyclist–pedestrian conflict.

== See also ==
- Jughandle
- Protected intersection
- Michigan left
