= Cyclops (album) =

Studio album by Terminal Power Company
- Released: 1995
- Recorded: January – March 1995; TPC's studio
- Genre: Cyberpunk, alternative rock, industrial music
- Length: 70:27
- Label: Stayfree Records
- Producer: Paul Aspel/John Roome

Terminal Power Company chronology
Red Skin Eclipse (1993)	Cyclops (1995)

Cyclops is the third and final full-length studio album by Terminal Power Company, released on Stayfree Records. The album was recorded between January and March 1995 at TPC's own recording studio. It is notable for being contributed to by Shane Embury of Napalm Death.

This was the band's last album, the band dissolved later in 1995.

== Track listing ==
1. "Locust of Reality" (4:00)
2. "Soft White Underside" (4:01)
3. "Nowhere" (6:06)
4. "Snakecharmer" (4:46)
5. "Cyclops" (4:16)
6. "Hammer or Nail" (6:44)
7. "Choke" (3:41)
8. "Survive" (3:30)
9. "All Hearts" (5:11)
10. "You Lie" (5:32)
11. "Into Two" (3:52)
12. "Wannabe" (3:27)
13. "Freakshow" (7:13)
14. "What You See Is What You Get" (7:56)

== Personnel ==
- Paul Aspel
- John Roome
- Dave Askey
- Le-antoni Haggerty (AKA "Snap")
- Hello my friend
