= Run Silent, Run Deep (album) =

Studio album by Terminal Power Company
- Released: 1992
- Recorded: November 1990
- Genre: Cyberpunk; Alternative rock Industrial music
- Length: 38:02
- Label: Situation Two/Beggars Banquet
- Producer: Terminal Power Company

Terminal Power Company chronology
| Run Silent, Run Deep (1992) | Red Skin Eclipse (1993) |

Run Silent, Run Deep is the first album by Terminal Power Company. It was recorded in two weeks in November 1990, for the Beggars Banquet sub-label Situation Two. The album was recorded at Expresso Bongo studios in Taworth and was partly mixed by Paul Speare, former saxophonist with Dexys Midnight Runners.

The album feature samples from various science fiction films, notably Blade Runner and Akira.

== Track listing ==
1. "The Hunger, the Heat" - 3:16
2. "Deeper" - 3:35
3. "Salvation" - 3:38
4. "Slow Motion Riot" - 3:20
5. "Burning Chrome" - 3:05
6. "Ice" - 1:11
7. "Blood, Flesh and Sand" - 3:32
8. "Fire" - 3:00
9. "Getting the Fear" - 3:39
10. "Wired II" - 3:10
11. "Urban Psycho" - 7:00

== Personnel ==
- Paul Aspel
- John Roome
- Matt Waddle (assistant producer and engineer)
