= Cyclops Peak =

Mountain in Enderby Land, Antarctica

Cyclops Peak (68°0′S 55°40′E) is a triangular peak marked by a round patch of light colored rock, standing at the northeast end of the Dismal Mountains in Enderby Land. It was mapped by Australian National Antarctic Research Expeditions from surveys and air photos in 1956–58, and so named because the light colored patch of rock brings to mind the mythical one-eyed giant Cyclops.
