= HMS Cyclops =

Four ships of the Royal Navy have borne the name HMS Cyclops after the one-eyed Cyclopes of Greek mythology.

- HMS Cyclops (1779) was a 28-gun sixth rate launched in 1779. She was used as a troopship from 1800 and was sold in 1814.
- HMS Cyclops (1839) was a steam paddle wheel frigate launched in 1839 and sold in 1864.
- HMS Cyclops (1871) was a turret ship launched in 1871 and sold in 1903.
- HMS Cyclops (F31) was a repair ship, launched in 1905 as the merchant ship Indrabarah. She was used as a fleet storage ship, and then a submarine depot ship. She was scrapped in 1947.
