= Protected intersection =

At-grade road junction in which cyclists and pedestrians are separated from cars

A video showing a protected signalised intersection to US standards

A protected intersection or protected junction, also known as a Dutch-style junction, is a type of at-grade road junction in which cyclists and pedestrians are separated from cars. The primary aim of junction protection is to help pedestrians and cyclists be and feel safer at road junctions.

At a conventional junction, pedestrians are separated from motor vehicles, while cyclists are placed in the carriageway with motorists. Cycle lanes are often placed on the nearside (right in right-side driving countries; left in left-side countries) of the carriageway, which can create conflict, for example when a cyclist is going straight ahead and a motorist is turning to the nearside.

At a protected junction, vehicles turning to the nearside are separated from crossing cyclists and pedestrians by a buffer, providing increased reaction times and visibility. Drivers looking to turn to the nearside have better visibility of cyclists and pedestrians as they can look to the side for conflicts instead of over their shoulders. At unsignalised intersections, it is practice to have one car length of space between the cycleway and roadway, so that cars exiting the minor street have an area to pull forward and wait for a gap in traffic, without becoming distracted by potential simultaneous conflicts along the cyclepath.

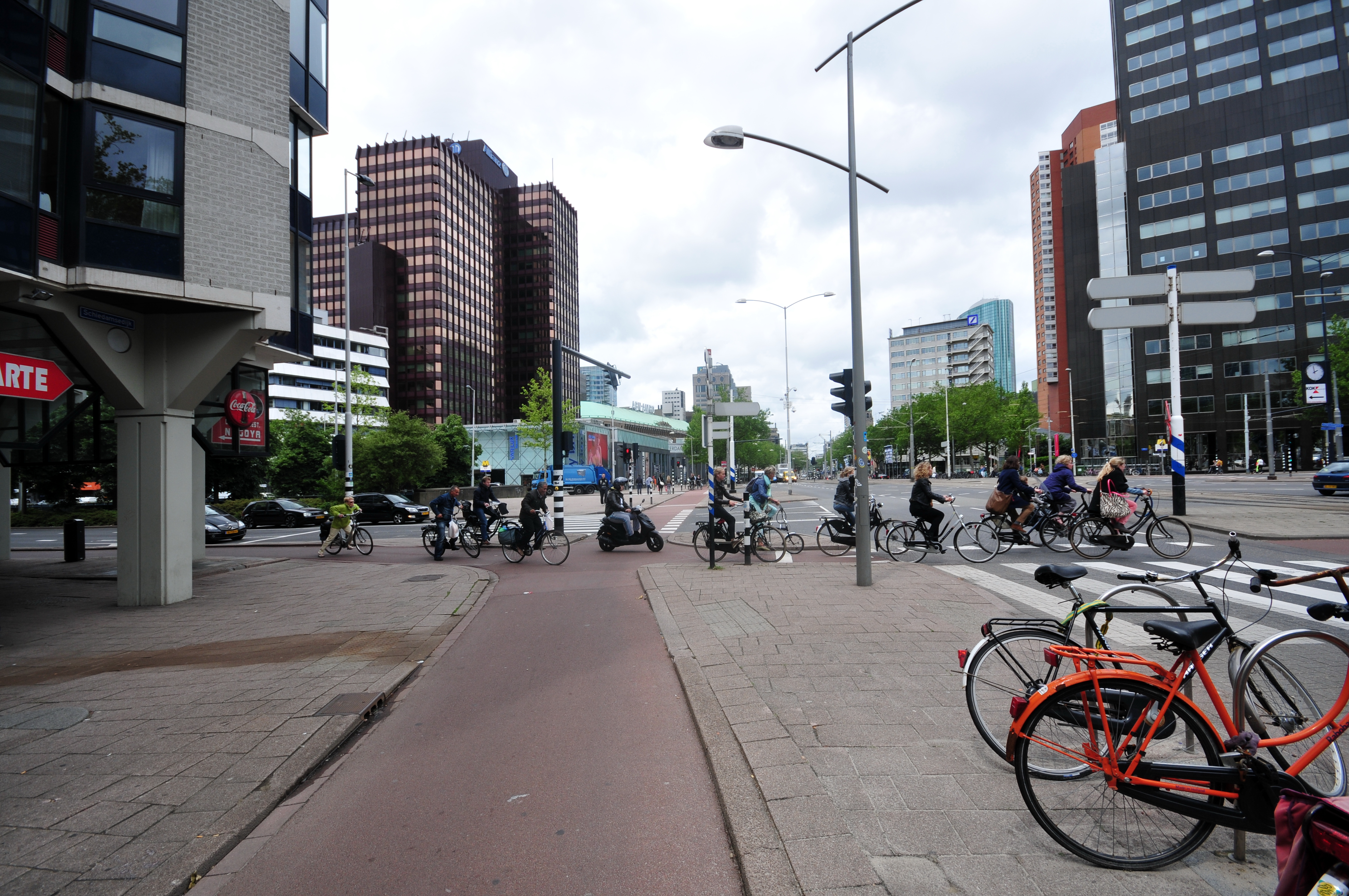
A protected intersection in Rotterdam in the Netherlands. A safe way to cross the road on a bicycle.

This type of intersection has for decades been used in the bicycle-friendly Netherlands, and Denmark. An alternative philosophy, design for vehicular cycling, encourages having bicycle lanes simply disappear, or "drop", at intersections, forcing riders to merge into traffic like a vehicle operator ahead of the intersection in order to avoid the risk of a right-hook collision, when a right turning motorist collides with a through moving cyclist. Design policies which do not allow the cyclist to remain separated through the intersection have come under increasing scrutiny in recent years as causing difficulties for less capable riders, leading to lower overall ridership and sidewalk riding, and being less safe.

== History ==
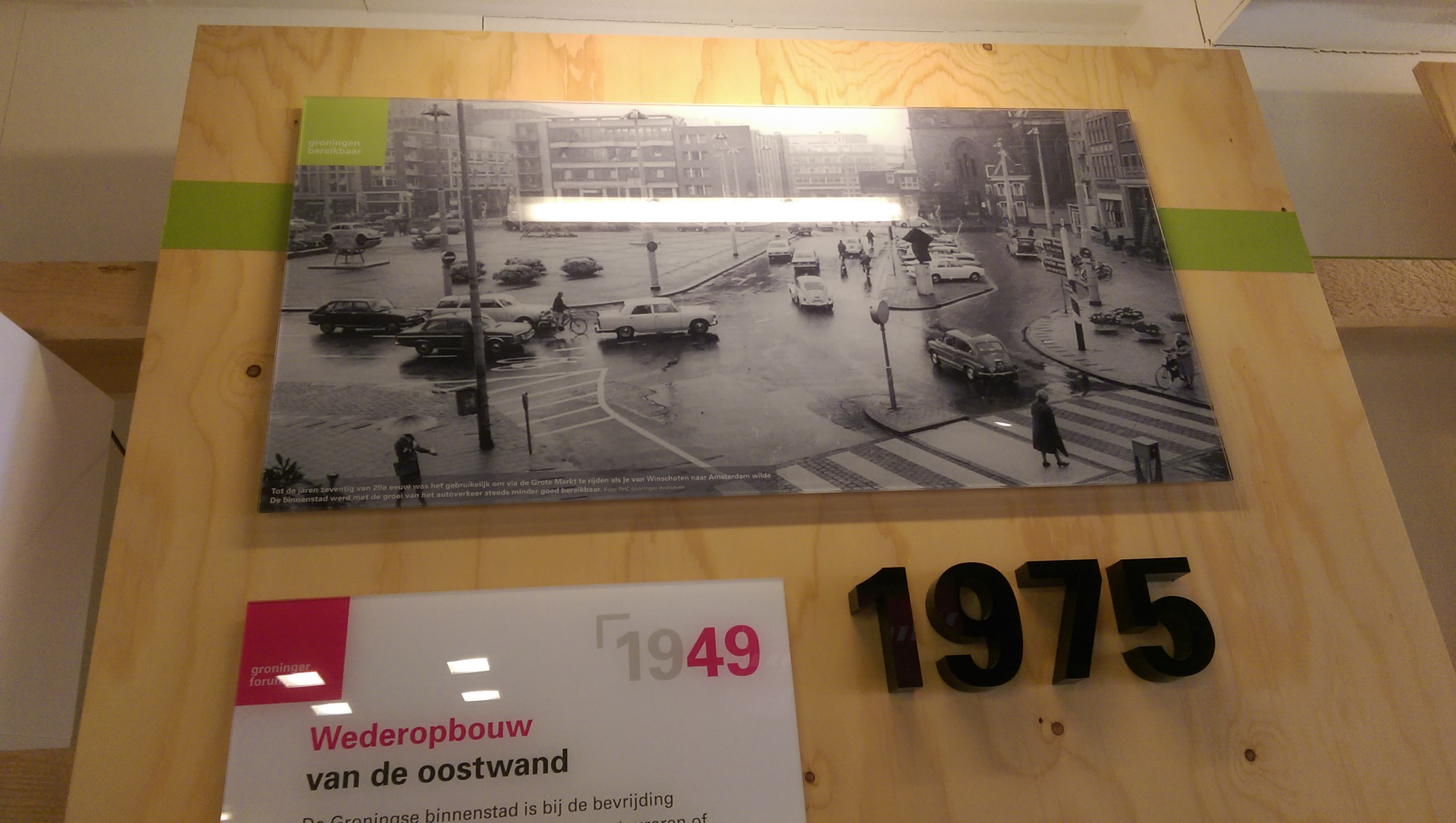
A museum exhibit about the Groningen Grote Markt shows a post-WWII bicycle lane that forced cyclists to merge with motorists. This design was eventually removed.

With the popularity of the bicycle, the Dutch began constructing separated cycle tracks as early as the late 1800s. The country's infrastructure was left in ruins by World War II, and some cities like Rotterdam had to be completely rebuilt. This presented the opportunity to create infrastructure more in line with the "modern" way. From the 1940s to the 70s, streets were built following a new design philosophy that attempted to integrate cyclists with vehicle traffic. After three decades, these designs proved to be largely a failure, with the number of kilometres cycled falling by 65% and the per-km rate of cyclists being killed increasing 174%.

In the 1970s, road traffic and urban quality of life began to be seen as a significant issue in Dutch city politics. This, combined with other political headwinds related to party reorganisation, the decline of national religious pillars, and opposition to the Vietnam War propelled left wing political parties to office in many city governments. Stop De Kindermoord road safety protests also occurred. As the nation again began to desire separated bicycle infrastructure, the protected intersection rose to prominence as an engineering solution for optimising sightlines. It joined other Dutch innovations in traffic calming and bicycle design, like the woonerf, and the bicycle street (fietsstraat), a variant of which exists in North America (see bicycle boulevard). Today, the Netherlands is widely considered the world's premier country for cycling, with more than 25% of all trips made by bicycle. It has reported a significantly lower cyclist fatality rate following the return to separated infrastructure. In the US, 58% of bicycle crashes involving injury, and 40% of crashes involving death occurred at intersections. In 1972, UCLA published a report demonstrating awareness in the US of the protected intersection design.

The protected intersection is only one of several treatments for addressing motorist-cyclist conflicts. While used in much of the Netherlands, including Amsterdam, local road authorities in other parts of the country do not use the classic protected intersection with middle islands, preferring to have cyclists move during a completely separated all directions green phase. Other options for reducing bicycle crashes at intersections, depending on context, include the use of bridges and tunnels, and planning or reconfiguring the neighborhood street/path system so that major amenities and schools can be reached without needing to travel along busy roads.

== Basic protection ==
In countries other than the Netherlands, where a segregated cycle lane came near to a junction, basic forms of protection may be used to accommodate cyclist safety.

=== Early release ===
Early release uses advanced stop lines and separate cyclist traffic signals to allow cyclists a head start on motor traffic. This permits them to turn across oncoming traffic without needing to wait in the centre of a junction.

=== Hold the turn ===
A hold the turn setup holds turning traffic at a red light while the cycle lane gets a green light in tandem with straight-ahead carriageway traffic, reducing the danger of hook collisions by turning vehicles. While this setup works well for cyclists turning to the nearside or going straight ahead, there is no provision for turning across oncoming traffic (unless a two-stage turn is permitted). Furthermore, it can lead to increased delay at junctions and is not highly space efficient (it requires a dedicated nearside-turn lane for motorists).

== Full protection ==
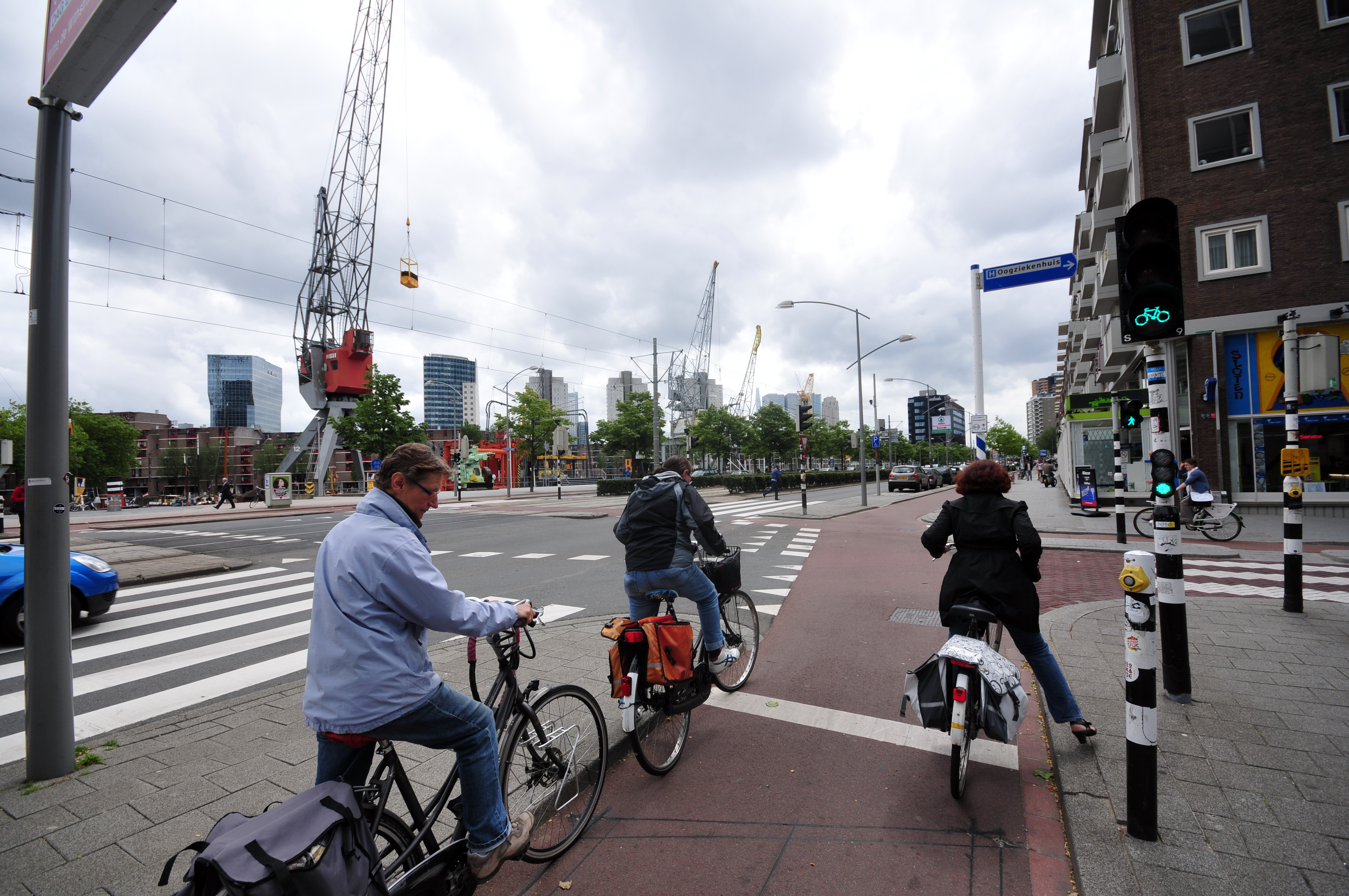
The protection of the vulnerable cyclists with a protected junction with bicycle traffic lights.

In terms of optimal spacing between the path and motorist lanes, it is generally practice to use 2–5 metres at signalised crossings and one car length >5 m at unsignalised intersections. Providing more buffer space allows vehicles, particularly those turning out of smaller roads, to queue in the waiting area. On the other hand, larger buffers could place the cyclist at a less optimal viewing point from the mainline, and delay the signal operation due to longer distances necessitating slightly longer bicycle signal yellow and all red clearance intervals. The exact optimal distance has been the subject of several studies.

=== Signalised junctions ===
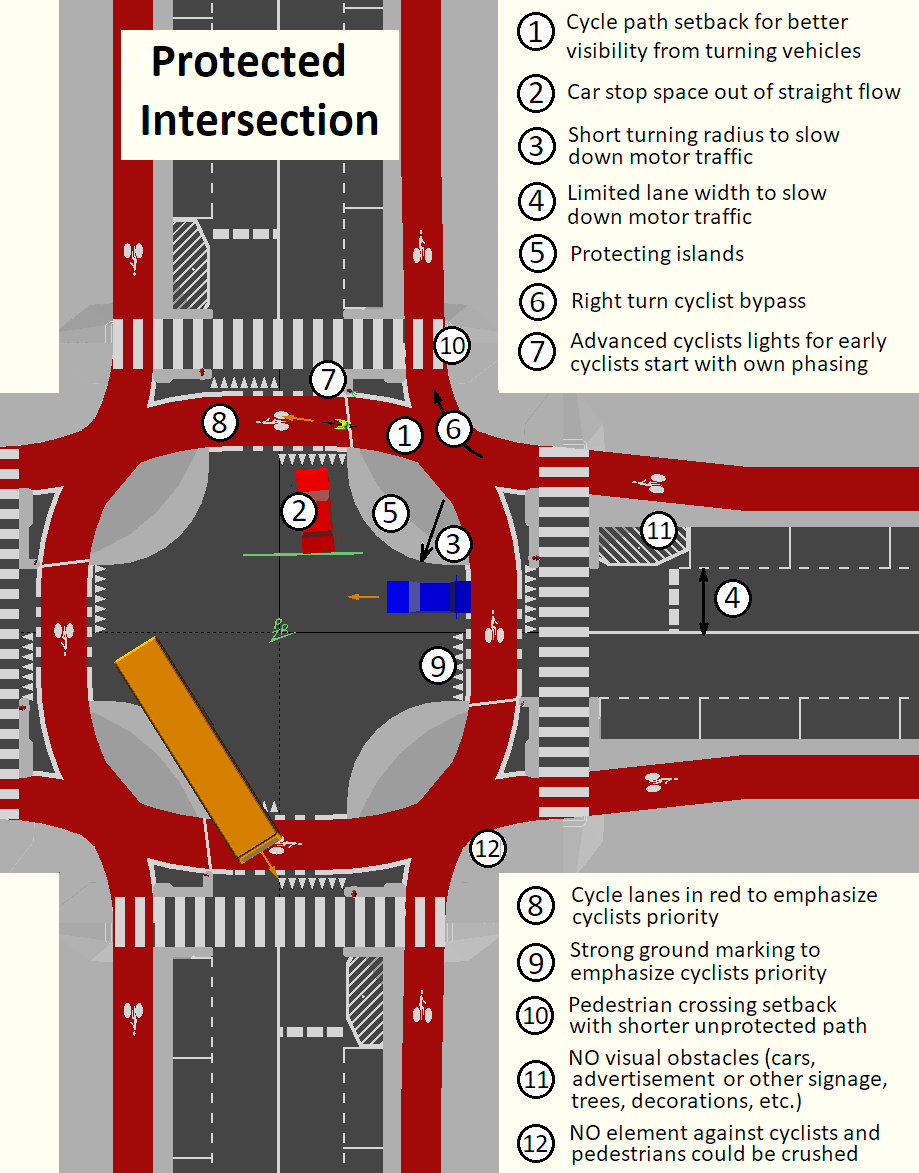
Features of a protected signalised intersection

Signal-controlled junctions are less sustainably safe as they normally prioritised the movement of motor vehicles. However, if they are used, they can be designed to provide full protection for those cycling. Cyclists ideally have a protected cycle track on the approach to the intersection, separated by a concrete median with splay curbs if possible, and have a protected bicycle lane at least 2m wide if possible (one way). In the Netherlands, most one way cycle paths are at least 2.5 m wide.

Clear ground striping is key to define the cycle lane and its priority. Wide strips are painted aside the cycle lane and 'shark teeth' (triangles with pointy end oriented toward the non priority vehicles) are used to reinforce who must yield. In addition to ground marking, the cycle lane color plays a role to remind motorists of cyclist priority. In the Netherlands, the cycle lane red color is not painted but embedded in asphalt to increase durability and reduce costs.

The design makes a turn on red possible for cyclists. In many cases, the cyclist who is separated from motor traffic can turn right without even needing to come to a complete stop.

This protected intersection design features a number of common elements that optimise safety:

- A corner refuge island with a reduced turning radius
  - A reduced radius could increase difficulties to turn for larger vehicles (trucks and busses), so in some cases, mountable islands have been used, similarly to the truck mountable aprons which surround the centre island of roundabouts.
- A setback crossing for pedestrians and cyclists, preferably 5 m (16.5 ft) at signalised junctions
- A forward stop line, which allows cyclists to stop for a traffic light well ahead of motor traffic who must stop behind the crosswalk, therefore placing bicycles in better view of a vehicle turning to the nearside.
- Separate signal phases, or at least a leading green interval for cyclists and pedestrians, to give cyclists and pedestrians no conflicts or a head start over motor traffic.

Some countries, such as the UK, do not permit partial conflicts. A partial conflict is where turning motor traffic may conflict with a cycle lane going straight ahead and/or a pedestrian crossing. These may be prohibited on safety grounds to prevent motor traffic colliding if they fail to give way when turning. However, they can also be beneficial as one cycle crossing will not require traffic to wait at a red light while the cycle light is green. This cycle light may be accompanied by audio signals to aid the visually impaired. They generally should not be used if the amount of turning traffic is high, a bidirectional cycle track is used or outside of built up areas.

=== CYCLOPS junction ===
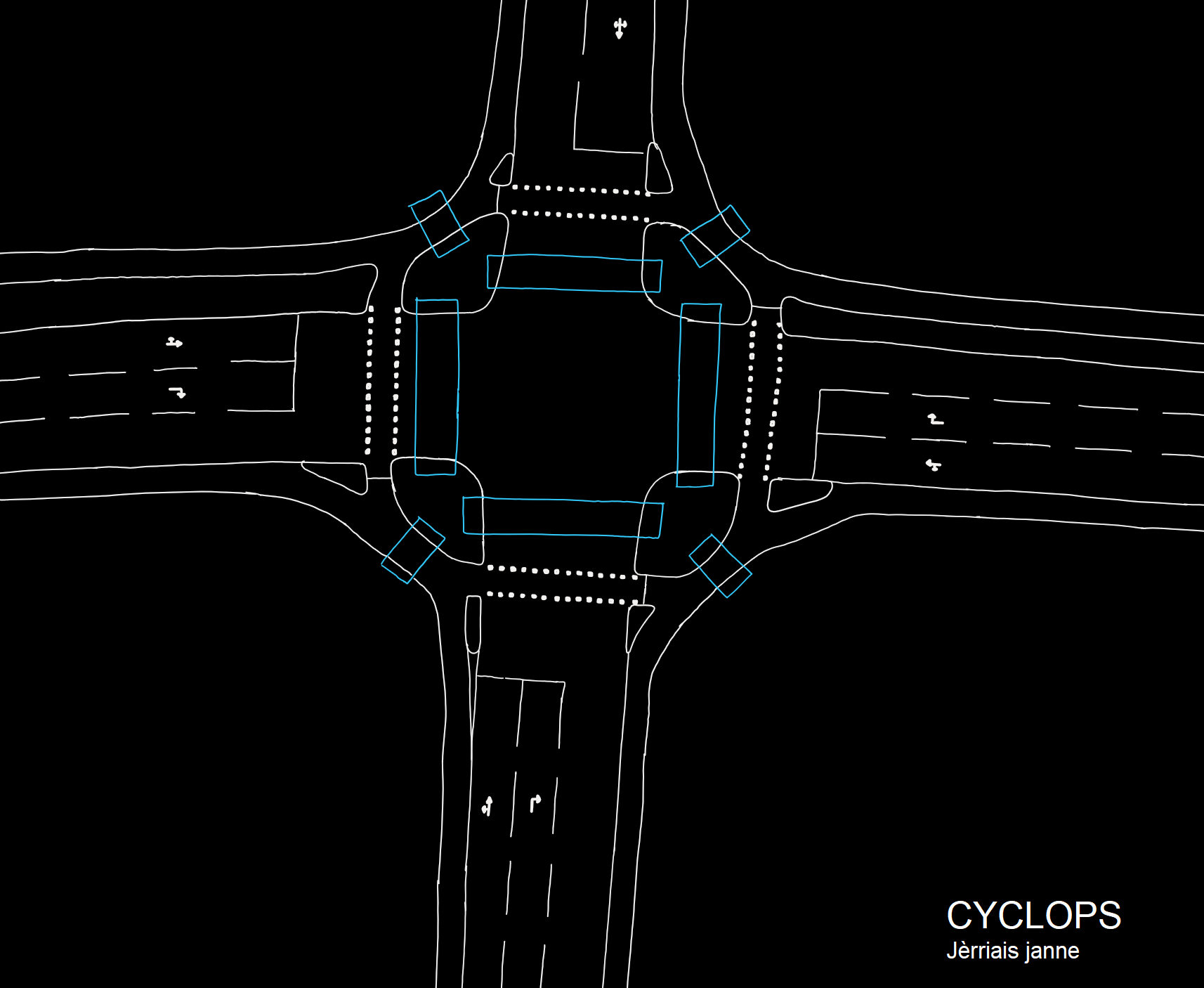
A sketch of a CYCLOPS junction

A Cycle Optimised Protected Signal (CYCLOPS) junction is a type of protected junction found in the UK. Contrary to both regular UK and Dutch practice, in this setup, a cycle track encircles the entire junction (effectively a cycle roundabout encircling a regular signalised junction), with traffic signals where cycleways meet the carriageway. Pedestrian crossings placed on the inside of the cycle track.

The benefits of this design mean that:

- all cyclist-motorist conflicts are signalised
- cyclists can complete a turn across opposing traffic (a right turn in the UK) in one manoeuvre
- all junction designs can be incorporated within the encircling cycle track
- there is more space for queueing at cycle signals
- cyclists can turn to the nearside without signalised control
- diagonal pedestrian crossings can be provided, to allow pedestrians to cross in a single phase

CYCLOPS junctions have been criticised for perpetuating traditional shortcomings of junction design, such as multi-phase pedestrian crossings.

=== Protected roundabouts ===
Protected roundabouts or Dutch roundabouts are a variation of protected intersections for lower traffic flow, without the traffic lights. In the Netherlands, designers have been switching signalised junctions for roundabouts, as roundabouts are safer. Specific facilities for cyclists are not needed at quieter roundabouts (<6,000 passenger car units per 24 hours), unless connecting roads have segregated cycle tracks. Cycle lanes on roundabouts may be considered by designers to increase the visibility of cyclists, however they are dangerous as drivers, especially lorries, might have an inadequate view of cyclists using a circulatory cycle lane.

For the safety of cyclists, motor traffic speeds should be reduced. Single-lane roundabouts are generally used in the Netherlands. Otherwise, a turbo roundabout can be used, which has multiple lanes and separates motor traffic going in different directions, but multi-lane roundabouts have been found to be especially dangerous to cyclists since many cyclists choose to ride in the outside lane and become much less visible to drivers. The best form of protection is grade separation, however as an alternative a segregated cycle track should be placed around the roundabout. This should not normally be used if there is more than one lane on exit. The track normally circulates one-way in the same direction as motor traffic to reduce confusion for motorists.

As cyclists will conflict with motorists at the exit arms of the motorised roundabout, priority must be established. In the Netherlands, cyclists will normally be given priority to promote cycling over driving. This is the design that has often been transposed internationally, labelled the 'Dutch roundabout', e.g. in Cambridge, UK.

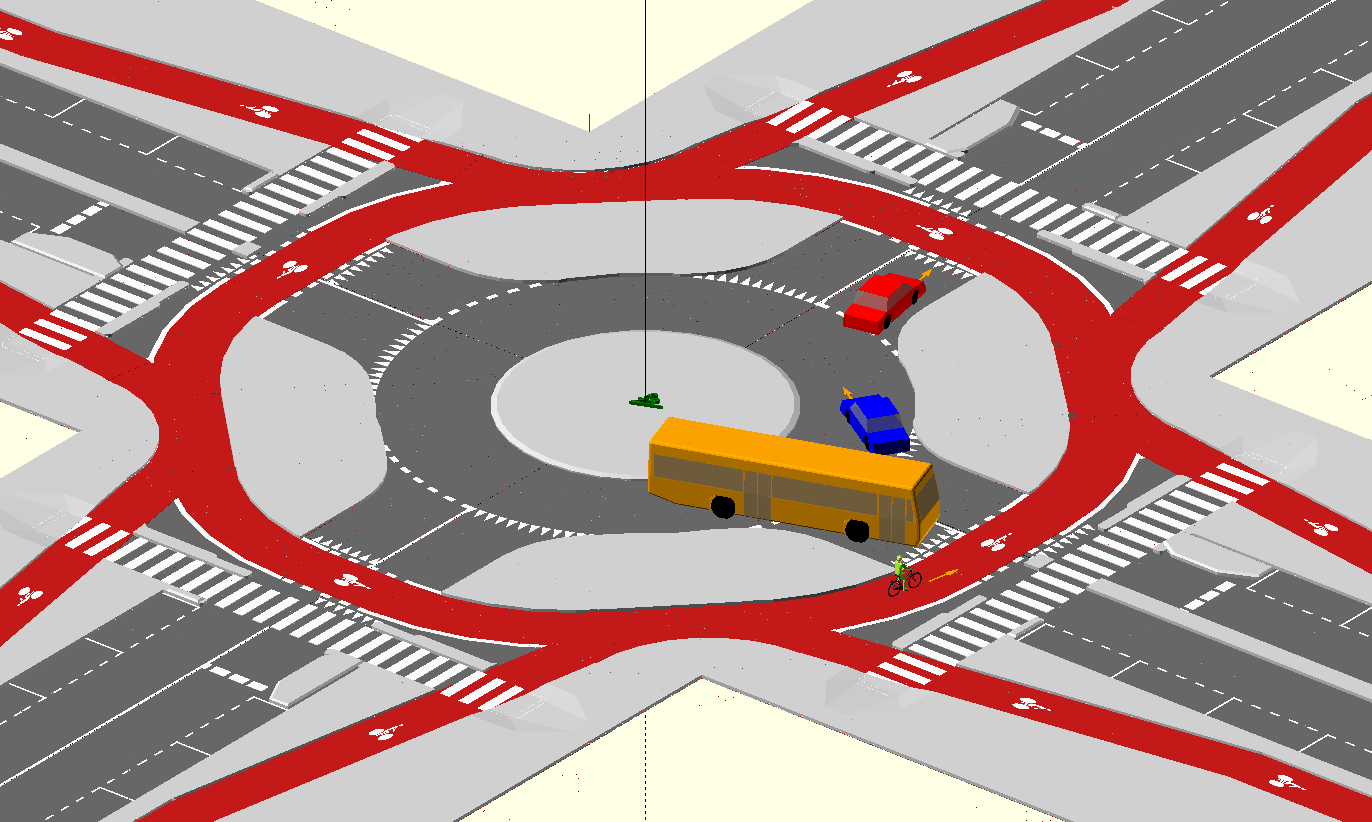
3D view of a protected roundabout, as commonly used in the Netherlands

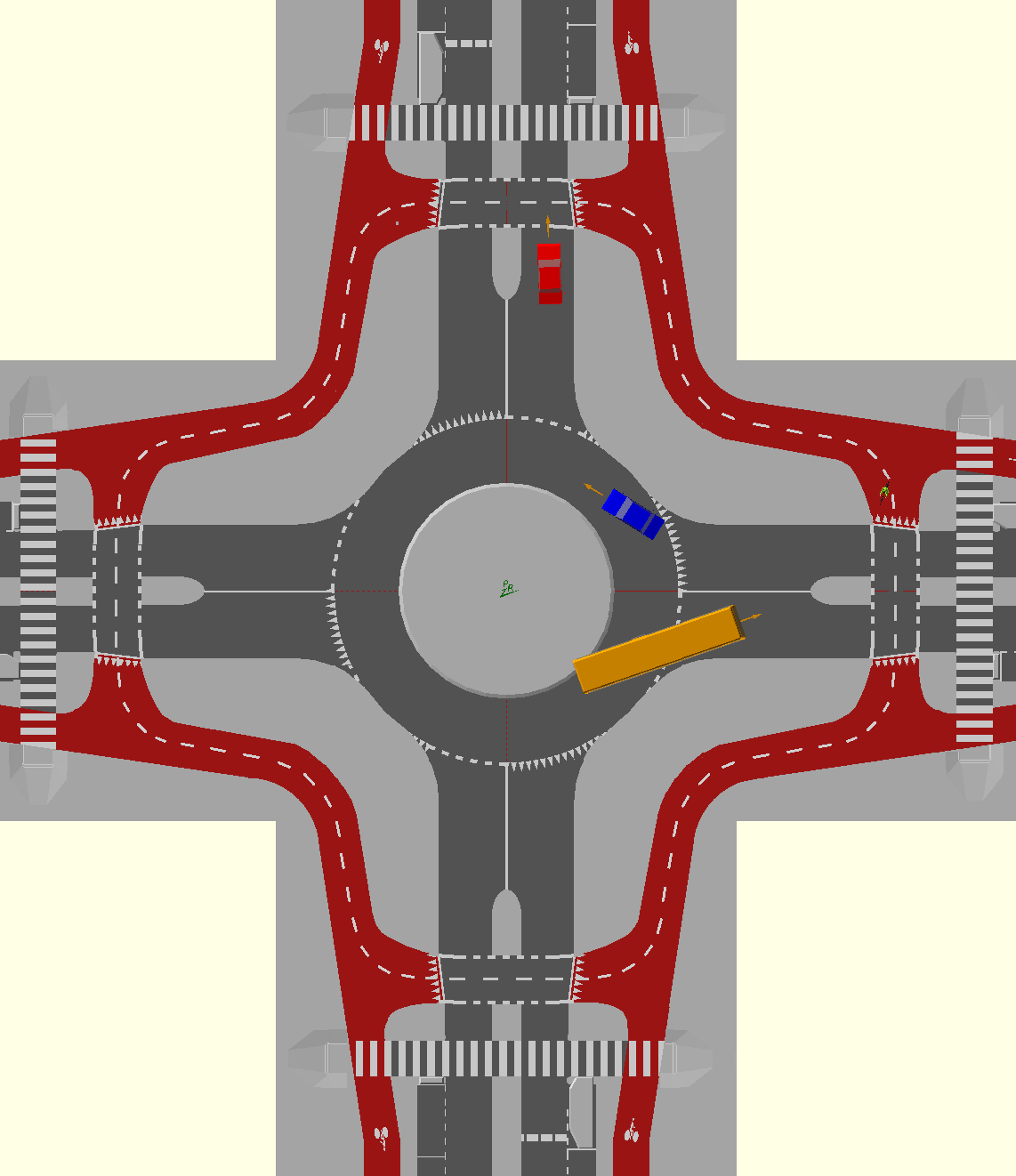
Alternative Dutch roundabout design, with bidirectional tracks and motorist priority

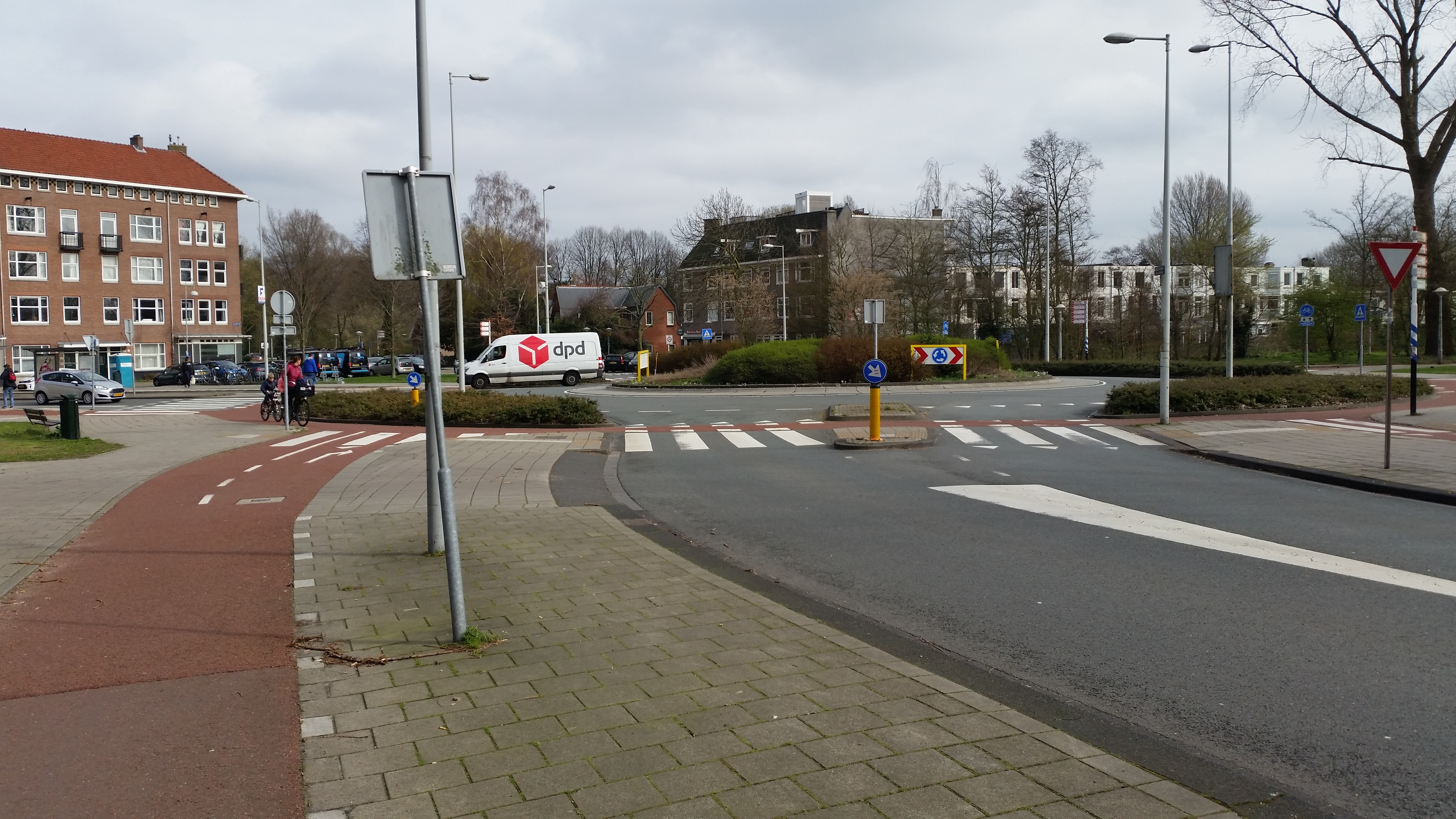
Cycleway on approach to a roundabout in Amsterdam

=== Experimental designs ===
To bring protected junctions to Ireland, the Dublin City Council trialled an experimental design. The cycle lane remains segregated, but contrary to Dutch practice is brought up to the side of the carriageway to improve visibility. Cycling campaigners have criticised the project for putting cyclists in conflict with left-turning (nearside) cars.

An innovative design in Zwolle, Netherlands, called the 'bicycle roundabout'. On the city inner ring road, this replaced a gap in the central reservation, with priority to motorists, a roundabout only cyclists could use, while for the motorist the junction is a right-in right-out junction.

== Design and publications ==
The Dutch not-for-profit organisation CROW publishes design manuals summarising best standards for bicycle infrastructure in the Netherlands, where biking is a much more dominant mode of transportation than in the United States. The organisation's and country's longer experience with synthesising biking and driving transportation modes have made CROW's design manual internationally popular. After decades of publications in the native Dutch, an English translation was released in 2017.

=== US Design Guide Controversy ===
In 2011, the primary North American planning organisation NACTO released new design guidelines which claimed to use international best practices while omitting Dutch best practices. This sparked controversy, especially after ambassador of Dutch bicycle infrastructure Mark Wagenbuur criticised NACTO for doing so in a prominent trade blog. Three years after the furor, Nick Falbo, then part of Alta Planning + Design, a firm behind the NACTO designs, published ‘protectedintersection.com’, which integrated more European design concepts.

In 2015, Alta Planning + Design published schematics and some realisations of "protected intersections" in the US and Canada closer to Dutch practice. Later in the year, the Massachusetts Department of Transportation released their Separated Bike Lane Planning and Design Guide, which includes extensive discussion of protected intersections, and was used as a pilot for the upcoming AASHTO Bike Guide. In 2019, NACTO, whose original Urban Bikeways Design guide generated the controversy, released "Don't Give Up at the Intersection", which encourages protected intersections as an alternative to bicycle lane drops. In 2021, the Invest in America Act became law, which amended the federal Highway Safety Improvement Program to recognise "protected intersection features" along with other separated bikeway treatments.

== See also ==
- Cyclability, how well suited an area is for cycling
- Cycling infrastructure, infrastructure used by cyclists
- Cyclist crossing, point where a cyclists crosses a route for another mode of transport
- Hook turn, road-vehicular manoeuvre for turning across lanes of opposing traffic
- Right-hook accident, traffic collision where a turning motor vehicle hits a pedestrian or cyclist
