= John Roome =

English musician (born 1968)

Witchman
- John Roome, AKA Witchman

Background information
- Born: 26 August 1968 (age 58)
- Origin: Birmingham, England
- Genres: Electronica, hip hop, breakbeat
- Years active: 1995–2002
- Labels: Deviant Records leaf Records; Blue Planet Records; Invisible Records (US)
- Website: Official Website

John Roome (born 26 August 1968, a.k.a. Witchman) is a hip hop/breakbeat artist who has worked with The Orb and The Jungle Brothers.

Having completed the score on five movies (Messengers, Dead End Road, Song of Songs, Want and Final Curtain) he has provided material for John Leguizamo's Undefeated and Into the Sun, as well as John Carpenter's Masters of Horror.

Roome has contributed music to various other projects including popular television shows like Cold Case, CSI: Miami, CSI: NY, Nip Tuck and Las Vegas. Most recently completed is the score for Sega's Full Auto video game for the Xbox 360 (PS3 to follow) and music for the Miami Vice film trailer. It has been confirmed that John will be the composer for two up and coming feature films, Death Walks the Streets and Lost Not Found.

== Discography ==
=== Albums ===
- Explorimenting beats Deviant Records, released 17/6/2002, Cat No. – DVNT19CD.
- Heavy Traffic Deviant Records, released 27/10/1997, Cat No. – DVNT27CD.
- Witchman Vs Jammin' Unit – Inferno Blue Planet Records, released 14/9/1998, Cat No. – PLAN17CD
- Goldwater – Dustbowl Invisible, released 1/10/1999Cat No. – INV7003CD

(NB. Goldwater is John Roome's atmospheric ambient project. This album was released in 1999 in the USA on Invisible Records.)

=== Singles ===
- "Heavy Mental EP" Deviant Records, released 1/8/1997, Cat No. – 12" maxi-single DVNT21X; DVNT21CDS.
- "Nightmare Alley" Deviant Records, released 1/1/1997 Cat No. – DVNT017CDS.
- "Main Vien EP" Blue Angel/ Rising High records, released 7/9/1995, Cat No. – BARH002.
- "States of Mind EP" Blue Angel/ Rising High records, released 7/7/1997, Cat No. – BARH005.
- "Shape of Rage EP" Leaf Records, released 7/7/1996, Cat No. – DOCK4.
- "Offbeat" Blue Angel, released 1/5/1996, Cat No. – ANGEL5.
