= Road signs in the United Kingdom =

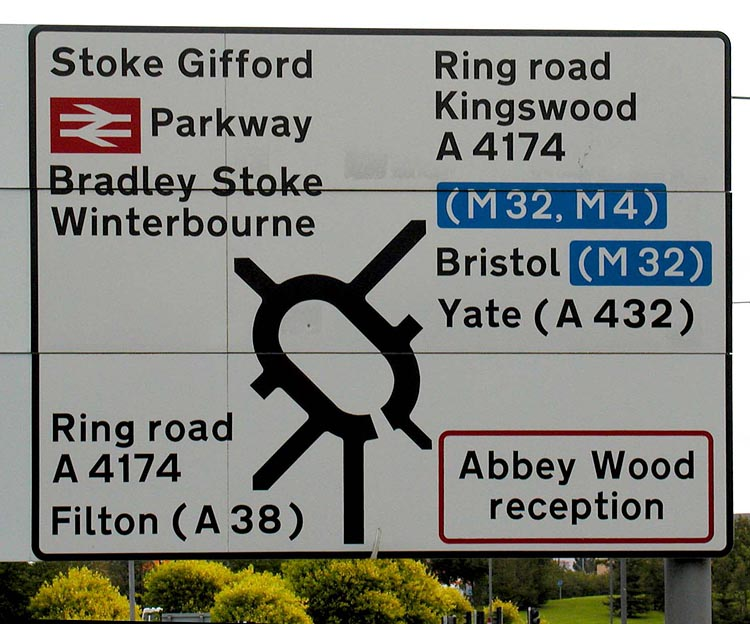
A non-primary road sign near Bristol shows Guildford Rules patches.

Road signs in the United Kingdom and its associated Crown dependencies and overseas territories conform broadly to the standards set by the Vienna Convention on Road Signs and Signals. The Traffic Signs Regulations and General Directions set out the specific design and use of traffic signs in Great Britain, and the Traffic Signs Regulations (Northern Ireland) 1997 in Northern Ireland. Features specific to British road signs include the use of miles and yards for distances, and the use of the Welsh language on signs in Wales and Scottish Gaelic on signs in parts of Scotland.

== History ==
=== Early traffic signs ===
==== Milestones and direction markers ====
The Romans used milestones, some of which survive, notably on Stanegate beside Hadrian's Wall.

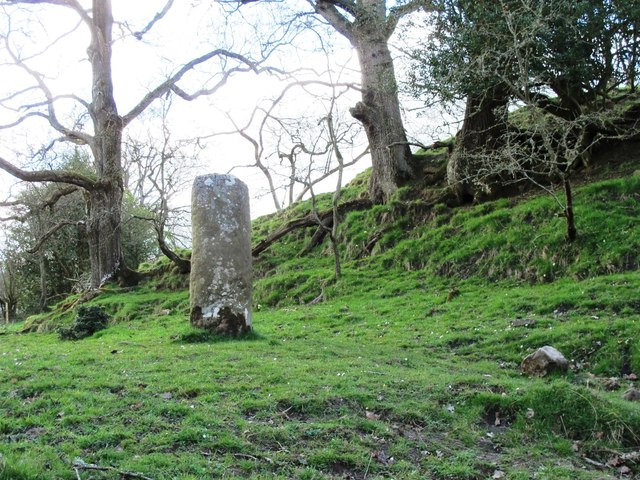
Roman milestone by the Stanegate at Chesterholm

With the rise of coaching in the eighteenth century, roads were improved and milestones placed. An early set was that placed in 1728 – 1732 between Cambridge and Barkway by Dr William Warren of Trinity Hall (hence the crest on the stones).

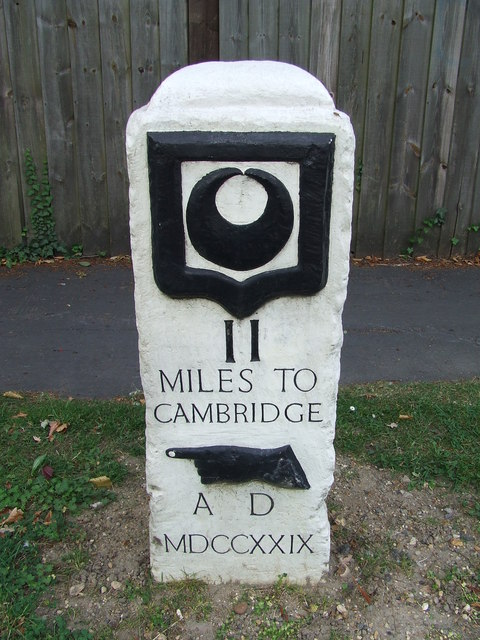
Milestone II of the set erected 1728-1732 between Cambridge and Barkway

The Turnpike Roads Act 1773 required markers to be erected along the turnpike roads indicating the distance between the main towns on the road. These were known as "guide posts" or "fingerposts".

==== Protection of bridges ====
After the passing of the Malicious Injuries to Property Act 1827, highway authorities started to place notices on their bridges warning against anyone damaging them. Most notices were placed at the centre of the bridge on its parapet and so informed those in the community who used the bridge rather than addressing travellers There are about twenty of these notices in Dorset.

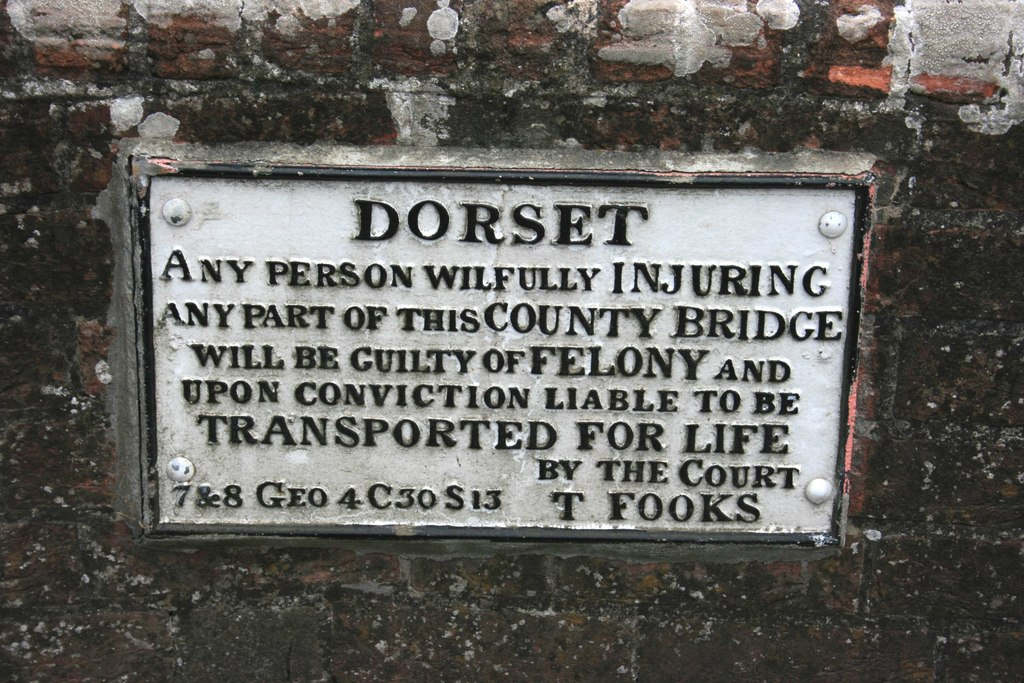
Pre-1861 warning notice, Bockhampton Bridge, Dorset

The Malicious Injuries to Property Act 1827 was repealed in 1861, the same year as the Locomotive Act 1861 was passed. Section 6 made it unlawful "to drive [a locomotive] over any ... Bridge on which a conspicuous Notice has been placed ... that the Bridge is insufficient to carry Weights beyond the ordinary Traffic of the District". New notices appeared; some completely new, others as replacements for the earlier ones and, at Bockhampton, Dorset, in addition. Some cited the Locomotive Act 1861 explicitly and specified the weight limit.

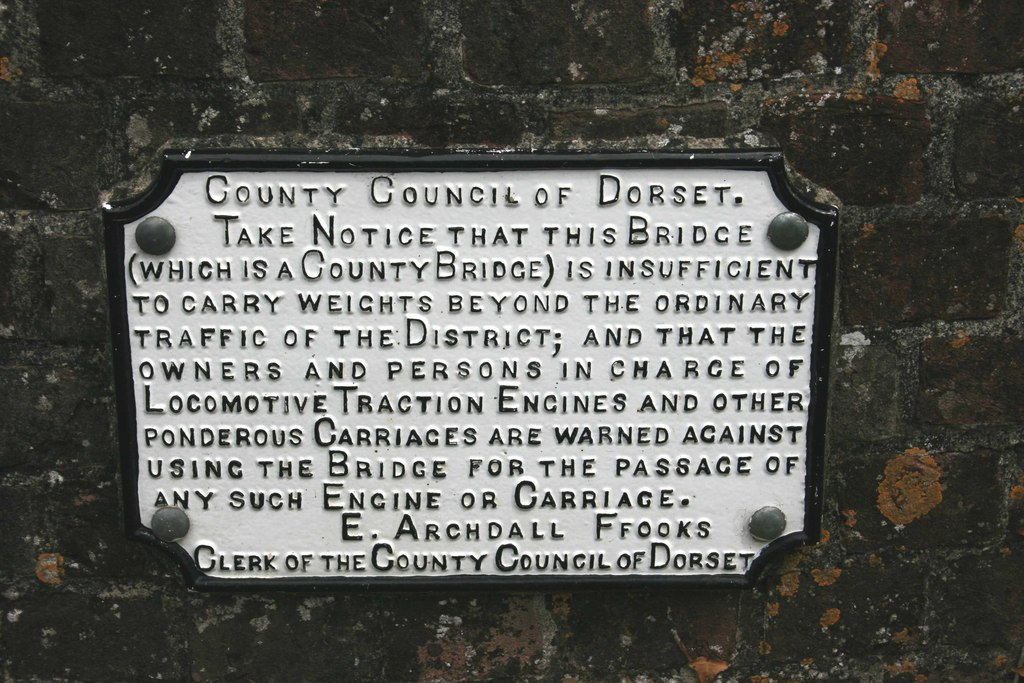
Post-1861 warning notice, Bockhampton Bridge, Dorset

The bridge over the Thames at Henley, Oxfordshire, has signs at each side placed to attract the attention of approaching engine drivers warning them to take one loaded truck across at a time.

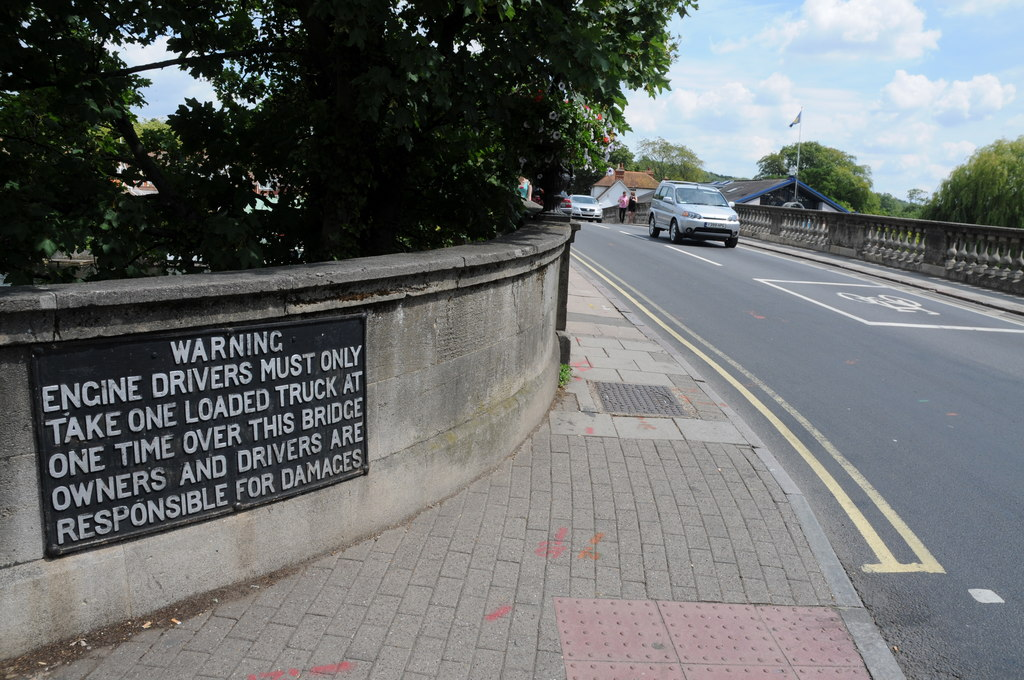
Sign on Henley Bridge, Oxfordshire

Most such signs are undated. One at Buntingford in Hertfordshire is dated 1899. That in Bournemouth is as late as 1922.

The Locomotives on Highways Act 1896 allowed local authorities to create bye-laws imposing (weight) restrictions on bridges. Most used this and subsequent legislation to place notices on bridges. Section 6 of the Locomotive Act 1861 remained in force until 1980.

==== Signs for cyclists ====
Modern British road signage can be traced to the development of the "ordinary" bicycle and the establishment of clubs to further the interests of its riders, notably the Cyclists' Touring Club (CTC), the National Cyclists' Union (NCU) and the Scottish Cyclists' Union (SCU). By the early 1880s, all three organisations were erecting their own cast-iron "danger boards". Importantly, these signs warned of hazards, rather than just stating distances or giving direction to places, acknowledging the fact that cyclists, like modern motorists, were unlikely to be familiar with the roads they were travelling along and were moving too fast to take avoiding action without prior warning.

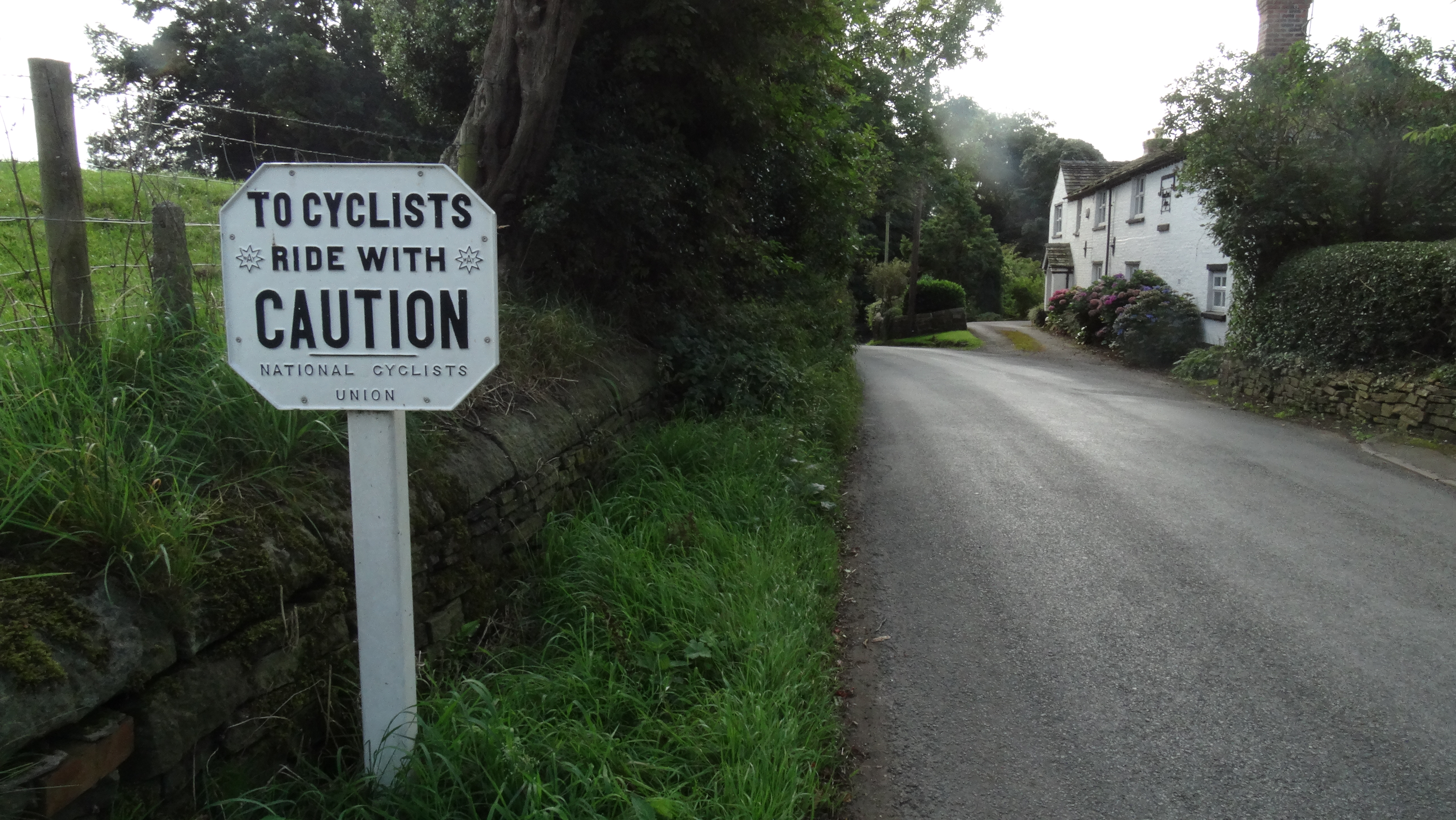
Caution sign for cyclists at North Rode, Cheshire

It was the cycling lobby that successfully pressured the government in 1888 to vest ownership of and responsibility for roads in previously established highway districts with county councils. There they would be funded from taxation rather than tolls. The districts were active in the erection of semi-standardised directional signs and mileposts in the latter years of the 19th century.

==== Signs for motorists ====
The Locomotives Act 1865 (popularly known as the "Red Flag Act") imposed a speed limit of 2 mph on motor vehicles in towns and 4 mph elsewhere and required a man to walk 60 yards ahead carrying a red flag. The Highways and Locomotives (Amendment) Act 1878 repealed the requirement for the man to carry a red flag, instead requiring him to walk at least twenty yards ahead to assist approaching horses and carriages. It retained the speed limits and empowered county councils to charge up to £10 for a licence to operate a locomotive on its roads.

The Locomotives on Highways Act 1896 deemed vehicles weighing less than 3 tons unladen to be carriages, thereby removing the restrictions on locomotives. A speed limit of 12 miles per hour (19 km/h) was imposed by regulations under the act. This led to the rise of motoring after 1896. As with cyclists, the larger motoring clubs, notably The Automobile Association (AA) and the Royal Scottish Automobile Club (RSAC) erected their own, idiosyncratic warning boards and direction signs on a wide scale.

Most were removed at the outbreak of the Second World War. Some escaped, including the one illustrated. This is from the years after 1910, when the AA had merged with the Motor Union and before it dropped "& M.U." from its signs.

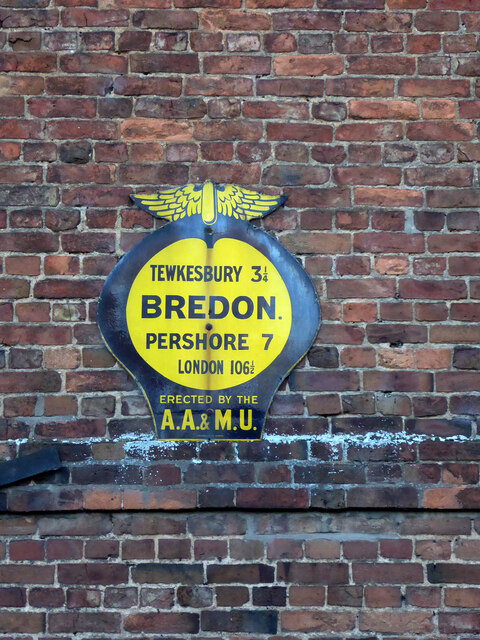
Old AA and Motor Union sign in Bredon, Worcestershire

=== Motor Car Act 1903; national traffic signs ===
The Motor Car Act 1903 further raised the speed limit for motor cars weighing less than 2 tons unladen to 20 mph. Local authorities could impose a limit of 10 mph "with a view to the safety of the public" and specify speed limits for vehicles weighing more than 2 tons. They already had powers to impose prohibitions and weight limits on roads and bridges using bye-laws.

In 1904 the Local Government Board (LGB) issued the Heavy Motor-car Order 1904 (SR&O 1904/1809), which increased the maximum unladen weight for motor cars to 5 tons, or 6½ tons with a trailer. This allowed the development of commercial motor vehicles, including buses and coaches.

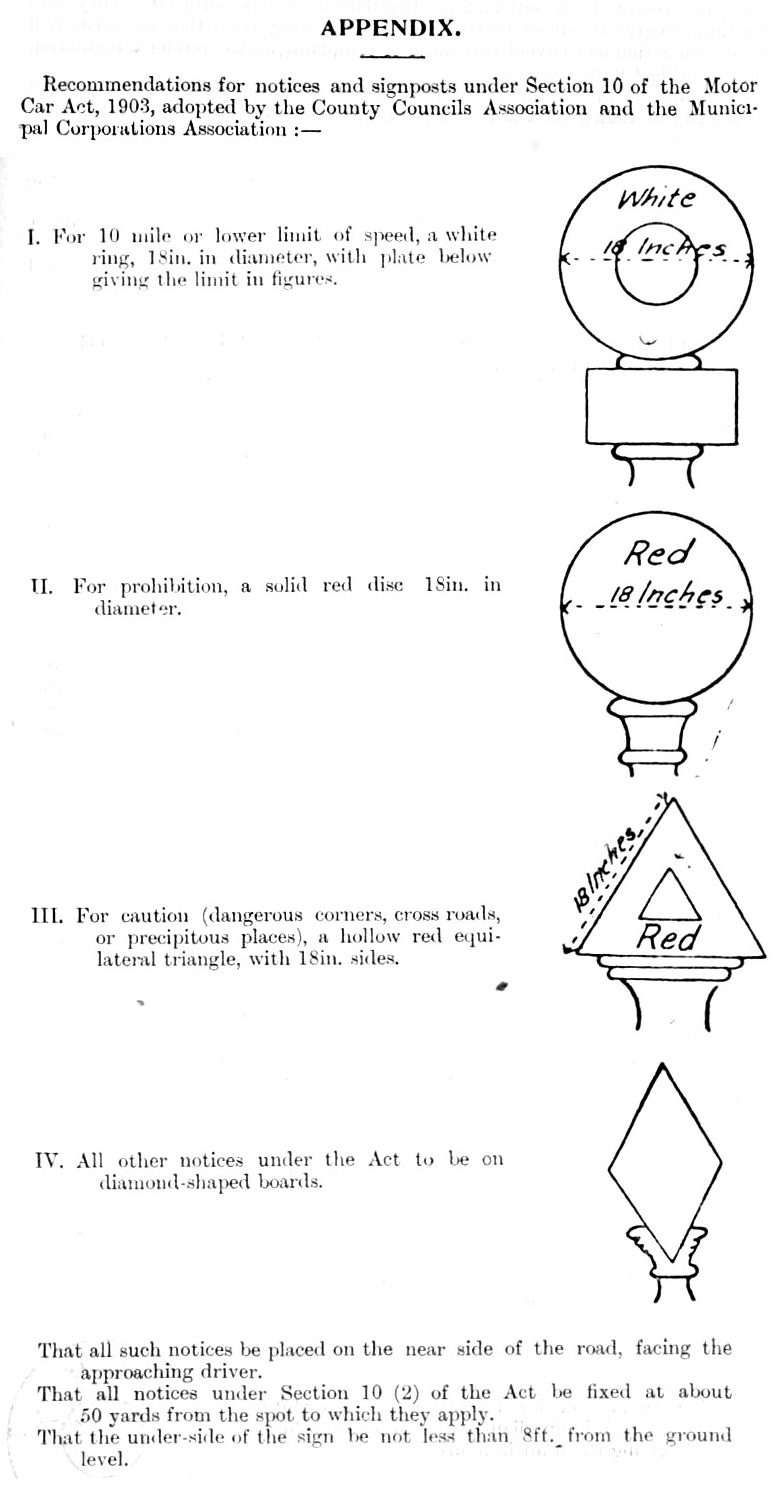
Recommendations for UK Traffic Signs, 1904 (Appendix to Circular of 10 March 1904)

Accompanying the covering letter which the secretary of the LGB sent to local authorities was an appendix (see image). This set out recommendations from the County Councils Association and the Municipal Corporations Association for four patterns of road signs. The circular expressed support for the recommendations, saying that if councils followed them, it wouldn't need to issue regulations.

Signs were to be set at least 8 ft (2.4 m) from the ground and, for caution signs, 50 yards (46 m) from their reference point.

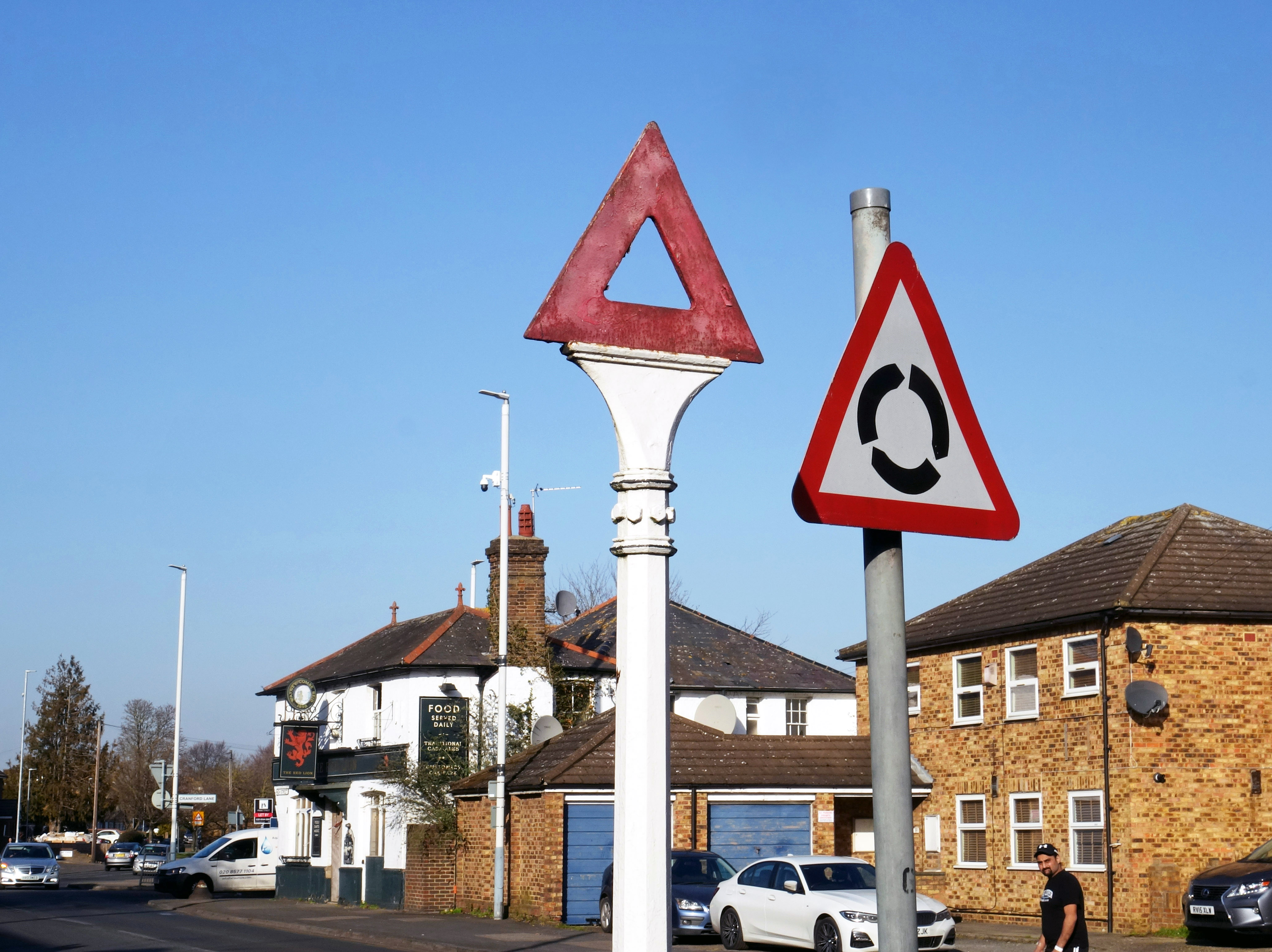
Caution sign on cast-iron post, Harlington, Hillingdon, London

Speed limit signs were only to be used where a local authority had imposed a limit, which had to be 10 mph or less. The plate beneath the white ring gave the speed limit, which applied only to motor vehicles: many cyclists could exceed 10 mph. It was customary for red bands to be painted on lamp standards, tram poles, etc. where a reduced speed limit was in force.

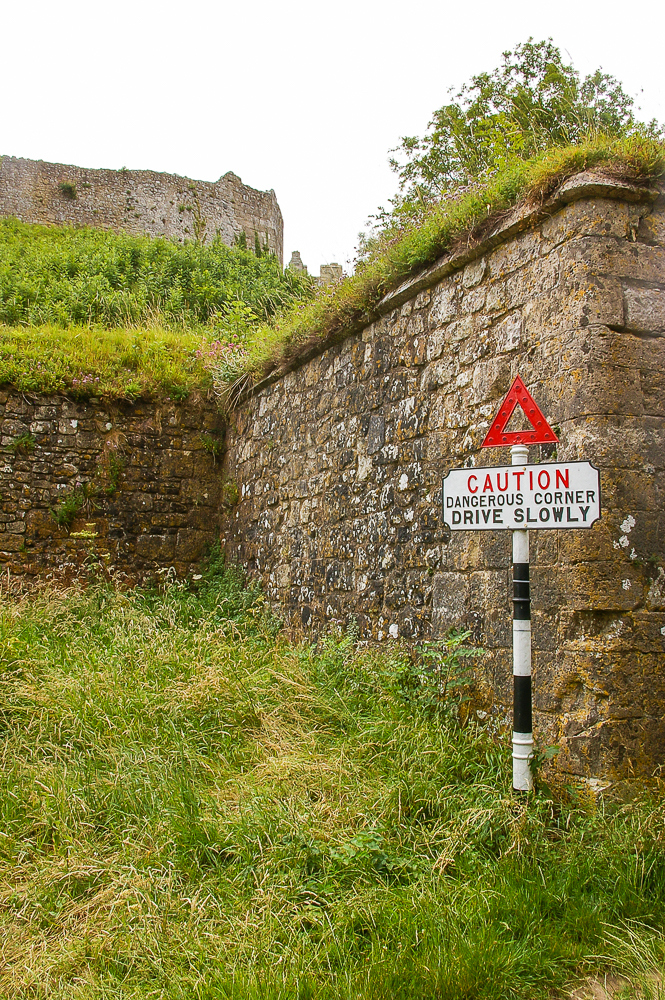
North-west Bastion, Carisbrooke Castle with a pre-1921-style Caution sign but a tubular post, so probably 1920s

Caution signs were warnings to motorists to slow down so that they could respond to the hazard ahead, whatever it was.

The diamond-shaped "other motor notices" were mainly placed to indicate weight and axle limits at bridges. Railway and canal companies used diamonds composed of two equilateral triangles, most with 18-inch (460 mm) sides; local authorities used tilted squares.

The earliest signs, including the post, were made entirely of cast iron. Two examples survive: a prohibition disc at Overstrand, Norfolk; and a caution triangle at Harlington, London (see image).

By 1914, manufacturers were offering Caution signs with plates which could be attached to specify the hazard. These included Dangerous Corner and School. Sometimes they also had an exhortation, e.g. "Drive carefully".

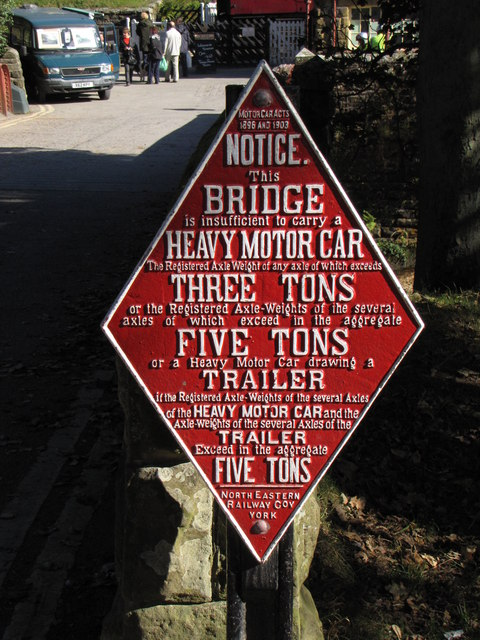
Diamond-shaped Motor Notice at Goathland, North Yorkshire placed by the North Eastern Railway Company

=== 1921 standardisation of road signs ===
A review of signage by a committee under (later Sir) Henry Maybury led to the issuing in 1921 of a circular, Standardisation of Road Direction Posts and Warning Signs Form 39. This strongly recommended the use of standard plates beneath the shapes from 1904 (except the diamond, which was complete in itself).

Caution signs were redesignated as danger signs and eight rectangular plates 12" wide by 21" high were defined containing a symbol and a word or two of explanation beneath.

The symbols were based on those which had been developed in continental Europe from 1909, with Maybury insisting that the symbol would from now on "be regarded as the principal means of indicating the nature of the danger".

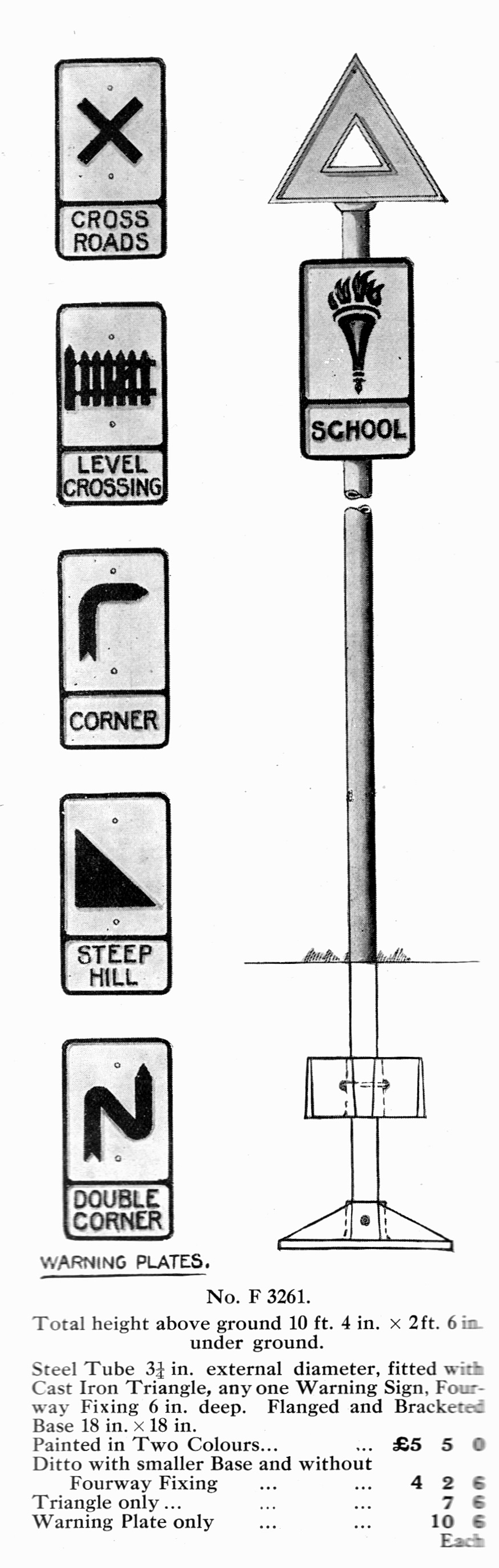
Advert for "Motor Sign Posts" in the Pryke & Palmer catalogue of 1930

Six of the symbols (the other two were mirror images of the corner and double corner) are shown on the advert for "Motor Sign Posts" of 1930 (see image).The least intuitive was the 'flaming torch of knowledge', which was used for 'School'. It was superseded by a silhouette of children in 1957.

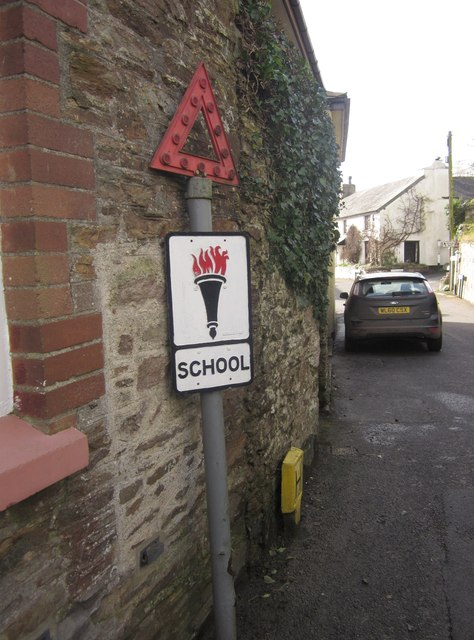
1933-style "Torch of Knowledge" sign at Main Street, Blackawton, Devon

Another significant change was the introduction of name boards at the entry to towns and villages. In some places these were combined with the red triangle and an exhortation, as at Colwall, Herefordshire.

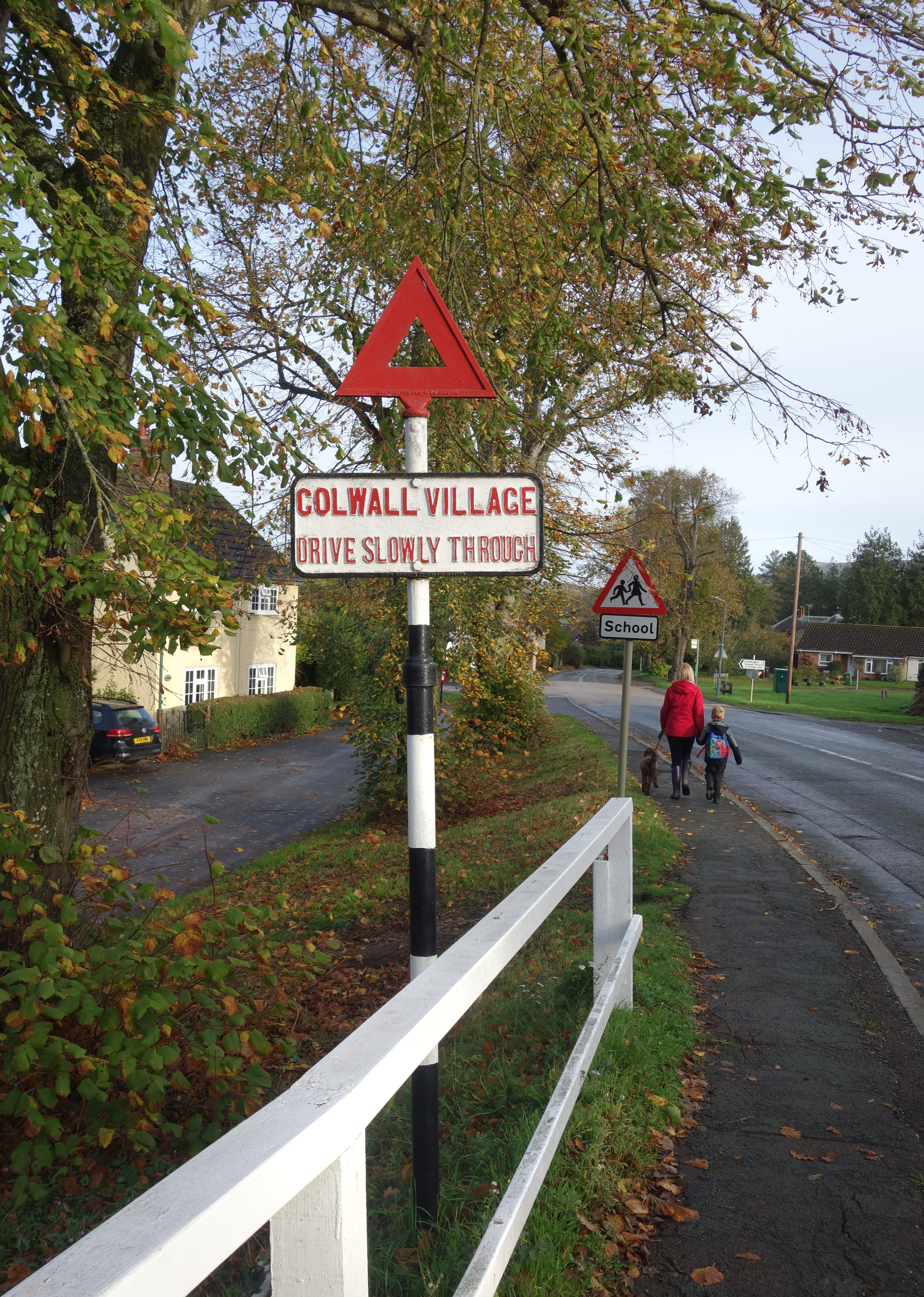
1920s 'Caution' sign combined with name of village, Colwall, Herefordshire. Note the one-piece casting of the triangle

Section 7(4) of the Roads Act 1920 allowed local authorities to make orders restricting the use of highways to heavy motors. A ministry circular set out recommendations for prohibition signs with rectangular plates beneath a red disc (see image).

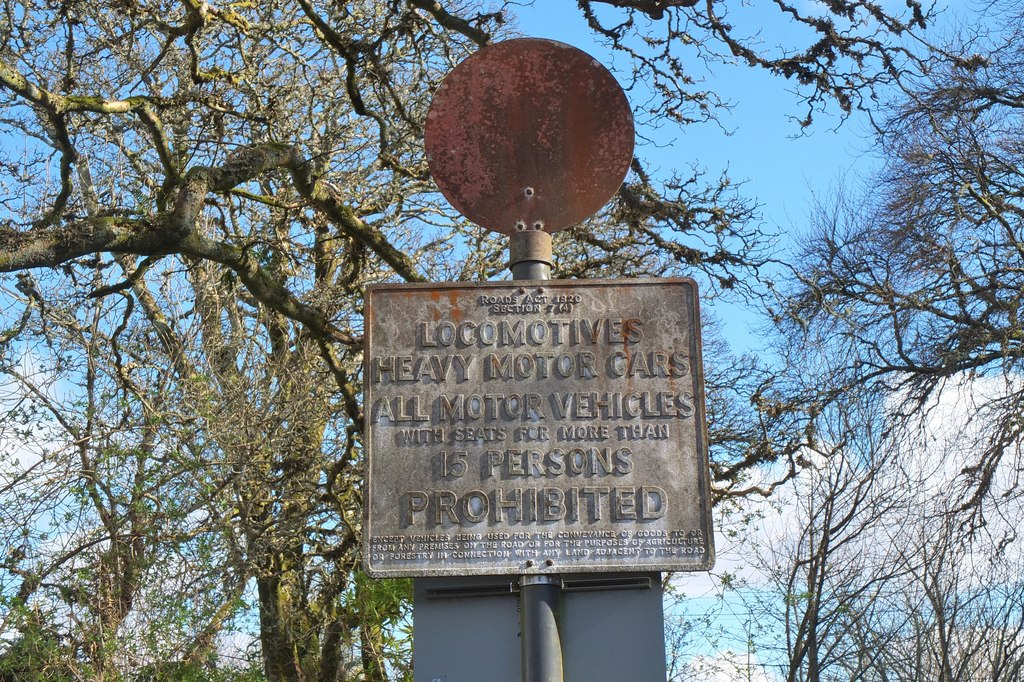
1920s Prohibition sign on heavy motors, Port Appin, Argyll. This sign cites the Roads Act 1920; later signs cite the Road Traffic Act 1930

In the late 1920s, motorists needed to understand both the new, standardised and the old Caution signs. The other types of 1904 sign remained in use: white ring for a reduced speed limit; red disc for prohibition; white diamond for motor notices (weight limits on bridges).

From 1926, gyratory systems (i.e. one-way clockwise) started to come into use in urban squares and at complex junctions, e.g. Marble Arch, Hyde Park Corner. Illuminated cast-glass signs were used in which the words "Turn Left – one way only" appeared in white on a blue background. Elsewhere, traffic was two-way around squares and junctions with a central feature, including roundabouts.

By the end of the 1920s, traffic lights had come into use in 50 towns and cities. The Ministry of Transport recommended a warning sign, 'Signals Ahead', which had a plate of the usual size depicting the signal head (with the lights coloured). This sign was surmounted not by a red triangle but a yellow disc with "Warning" in black capital letters across it. This echoed the 12" yellow globes (predecessors of Belisha beacons) which were sometimes placed above traffic signals to make them more conspicuous.

=== The early 1930s ===
==== 1930 Memorandum No. 291 (Roads) ====
In 1930 the Minister of Transport issued a circular advising local authorities to use the following additional danger signs:

- 'Road Junction' (three types: T-junction; side roads to the left and right)
- (Level) 'Crossing No Gates' (a 4-6-0 locomotive in steam)
- 'Dead Slow'

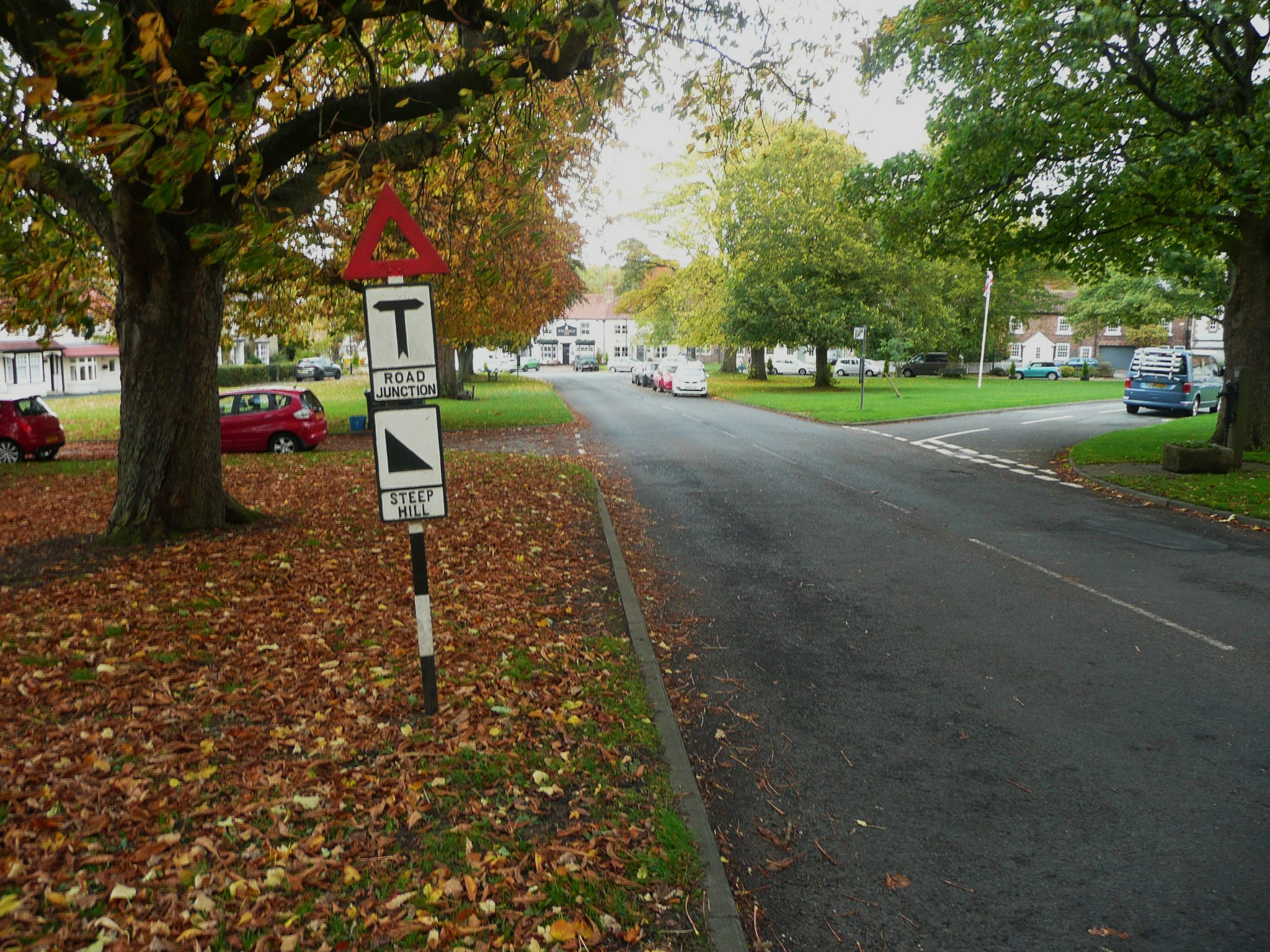
T-junction and Steep Hill signs, Hutton Rudby, North Yorkshire

The 'Dead Slow' sign was the crossroads or T-junction sign with new text, surmounted by a red caution triangle inside a red ring. However, this didn't change the rules at the major road: the driver on it still had to "exercise due caution"

A sign, 'One-way Street', was introduced with an arrow pointing in the direction of flow. It was regarded as informatory, as much for pedestrians as motorists, rather than an instruction to those on the carriageway.

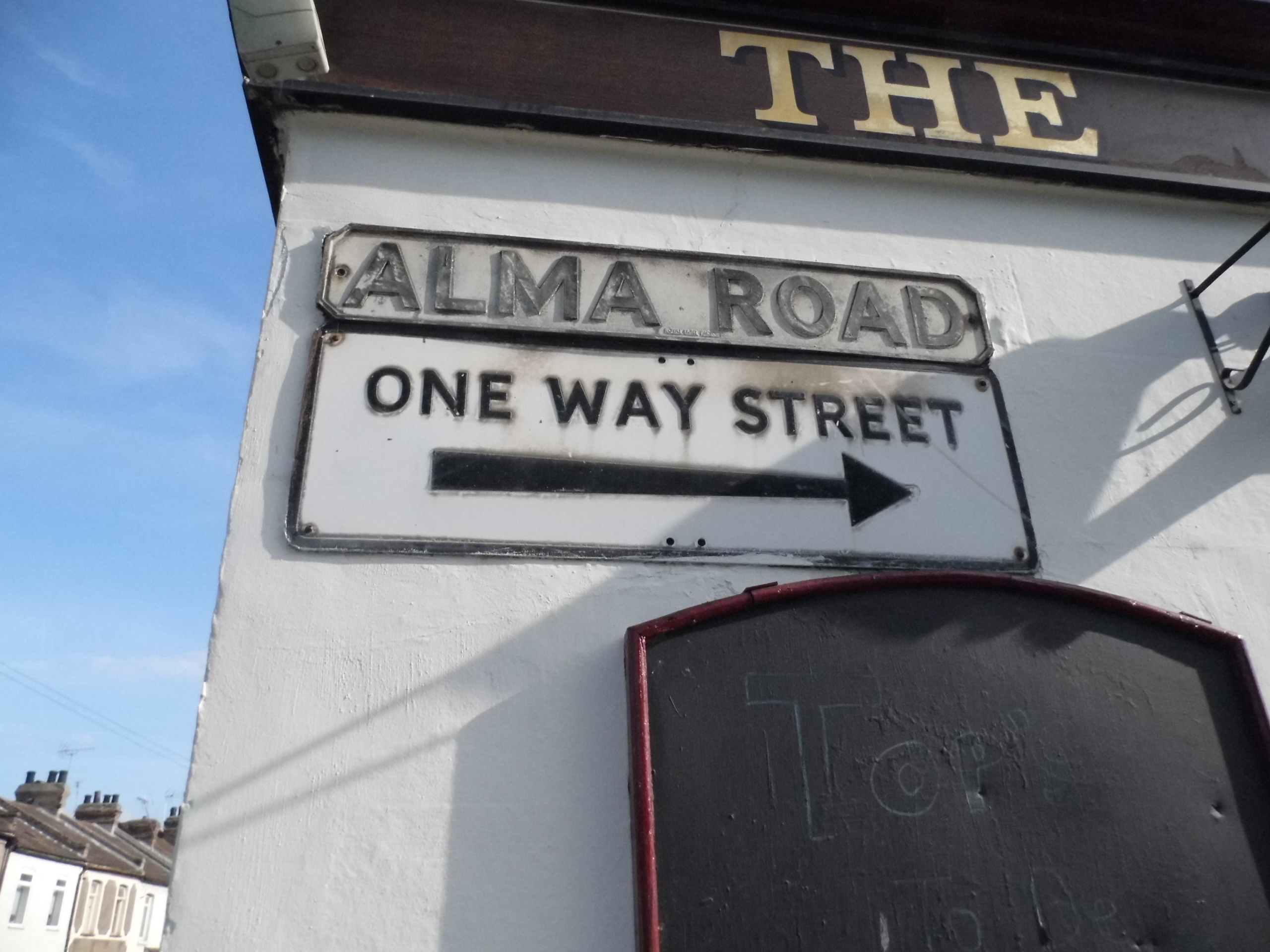
Cast-metal One Way Street sign, Swanscombe, Kent

A circular white "P" sign on a blue plate was introduced to show parking places. There was (and is) no general right to park on highways. By 1930, local authorities were under pressure to provide parking facilities. They did this either by designating parts of particular roads as parking places (marked by triangular metal studs) or by creating separate facilities on other land. In London, Leeds, Glasgow and some other places, cars parked on the road had to be left unlocked so that they could be moved by hand. Another white-on-blue sign with an arrow and the words "To Car Park" pointed the way.

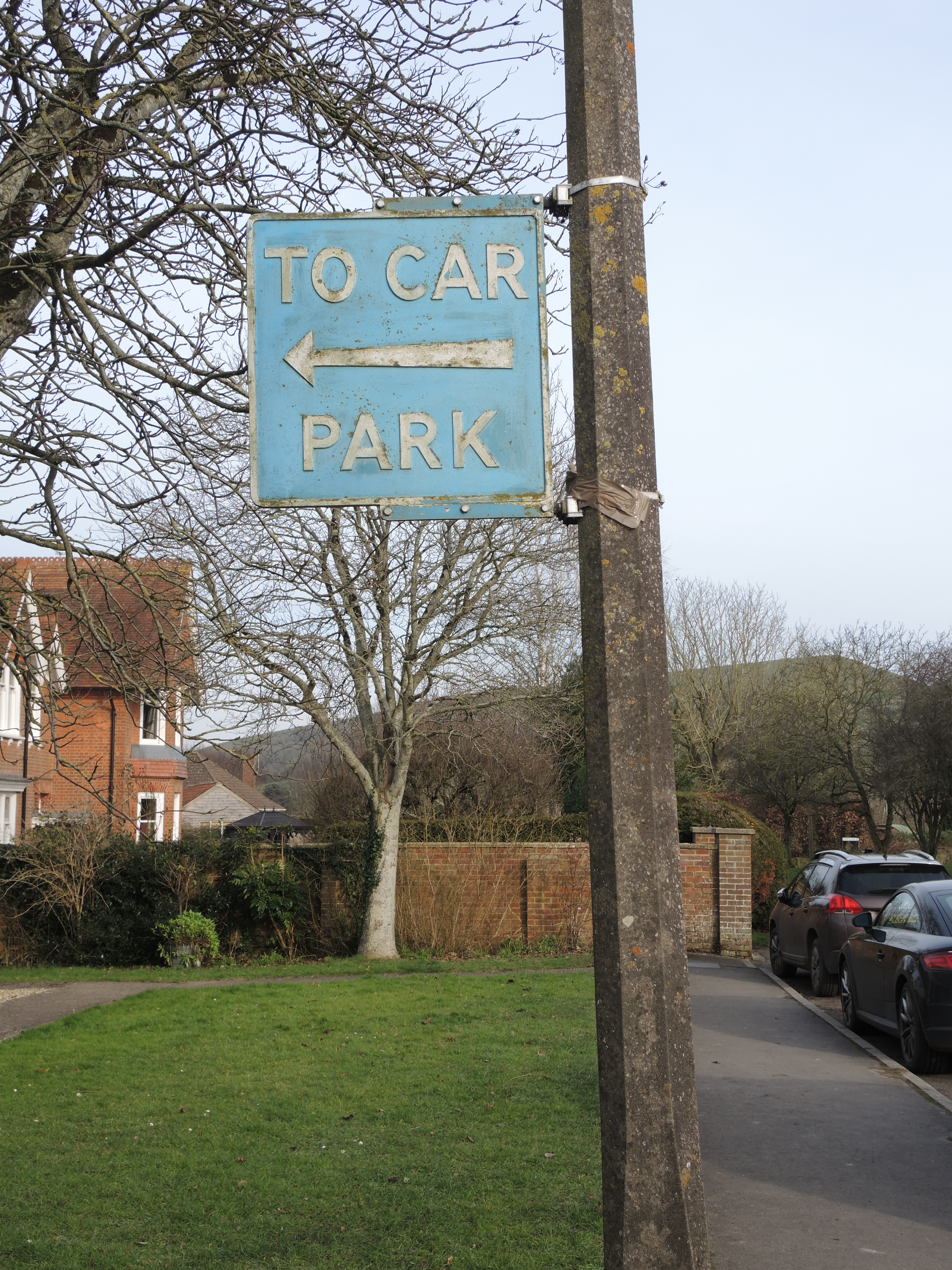
Cast-metal "To Car Park" sign, Bratton, Wiltshire

==== 1930 Road Traffic Act; Maybury Committee ====
The Road Traffic Act 1930 (RTA) reformed the regulation of motor vehicles and road traffic, It raised the default speed limits which the Motor Car Act 1903 had imposed, removing them completely from cars weighing less than 2½ tons.

The government took powers to mandate the traffic signs to be used and empowered local authorities to erect them. A departmental committee was set up in 1931 under Sir Henry Maybury to report on their design.

One constraint on the committee was the ratification in 1929 of the 1926 Paris Convention on Motor Traffic. This required the UK to use the symbols which the convention had agreed: sharp turn; cross roads, level crossings with and without gates; and uneven road. The symbol for a sharp bend was a tilted version of a double bend and the Convention required it to be used for all types of bend.

The committee recommended using separate symbols for left- and right-handed single and double bends as soon as the UK could either secure revision to the convention or escape from its commitment. This did not happen until the early 1950s; meanwhile the 1933 Regulations required new signs to use the international Bend symbol instead of the 'Corner' or 'Double Corner'.

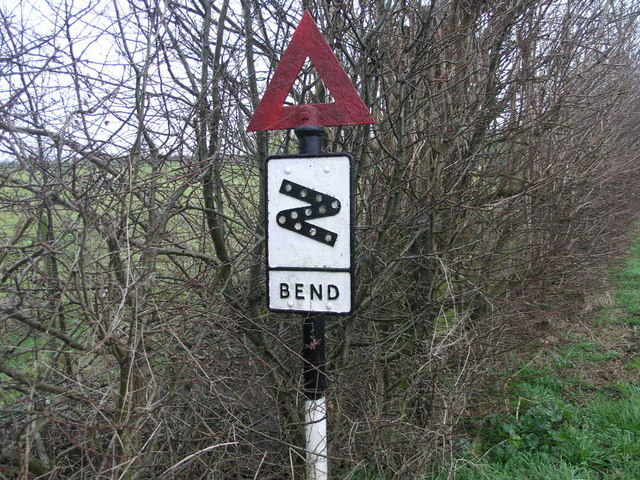
1926 Paris Convention Bend sign, Amber Hill, Lincolnshire

The UK did not subscribe to the 1931 Geneva Convention and so was not bound by it. However, the 'Parking Places' sign was changed to be square, which corresponded to that adopted by the 1931 Geneva Convention.

Other 1931 convention signs which the committee did not adopt but which were later adopted in modified form were:

- Speed limit, adopted for 30 mph in 1935
- No entry, adopted in 1950

The old red-disc prohibition signs were to remain with a new plate for use at bridges. There was to be a new style of plate with white-on-red text for 'No Entry: One-way Street', 'No Right Turn' and 'No Left Turn'.

Speed limit signs (white rings with a number beneath) were only used to show reduced limits imposed by traffic orders, bye-laws, etc. These were to be replaced by new white-on-red plates beneath a hollow red ring. The hollow red ring was also to be used with white-on-blue plates for Turn Left: One Way Only and Keep Left; the former were mainly used in one-way systems (including urban squares); the latter at the centre of roundabouts.

The plate of the 'Dead Slow' sign from the 1930 Memorandum was to be enlarged to become a new sign 'Slow: Major Road Ahead'. It retained the red triangle inside a red ring.

Red-triangle signs now had to have a rectangular plate showing a symbol with text beneath. The plate could be from

- the 1921 standardisation (except 'Corner' and 'Double Corner')
- the 1930 memorandum (except 'Dead Slow')
- new plates which the committee proposed:
  - 'Road Narrows'
  - 'Narrow Bridge'
  - 'Low Bridge'
  - 'Roundabout'
  - ' Hospital' (a white Maltese cross on a black shield)

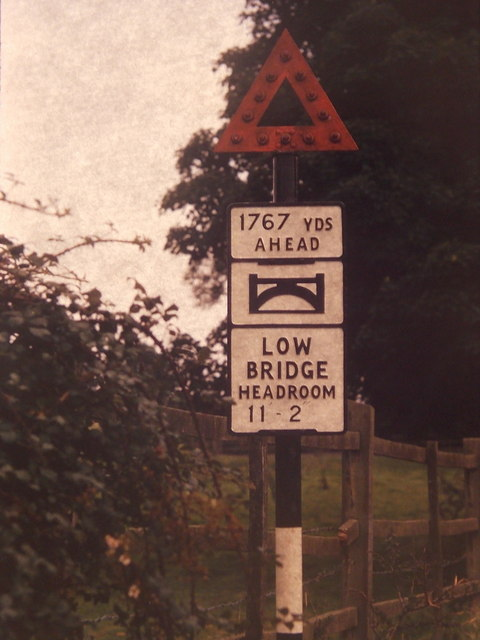
1933-style 'Low Bridge' sign with open spandrels (by the late 1930s they appeared as white-edged black triangles), Stoke Charity, Hampshire

In addition there was a landscape-format text-only plate for 'No Through Road'.

All signs were to be mounted on posts painted in black and white stripes.

To make signs visible at night, reflectors with glass lenses could be incorporated in the red triangle and the symbols on warning signs. Motorists saw these as reflected points of light forming a silhouette.

The committee reported in 1933 (the Maybury Report), and its recommendations were given effect by the Traffic Signs (Size, Colour and Type) Provisional Regulations 1933, made under Road Traffic Act 1930.

==== Consequences ====
In 1934, the Road Traffic Acts and Regulations handbook was published. This also clarified direction and distance signage, which remained in that form until 1964.

This was the end of non-standard permanent signs being erected by motoring clubs, such as the black and yellow vitreous enamel AA signs (although they continued to place temporary direction signs).

While the RSAC had ceased erecting signs, the Royal Automobile Club (RAC) had begun to do so to the official specification (save for the inclusion of the RAC badge).

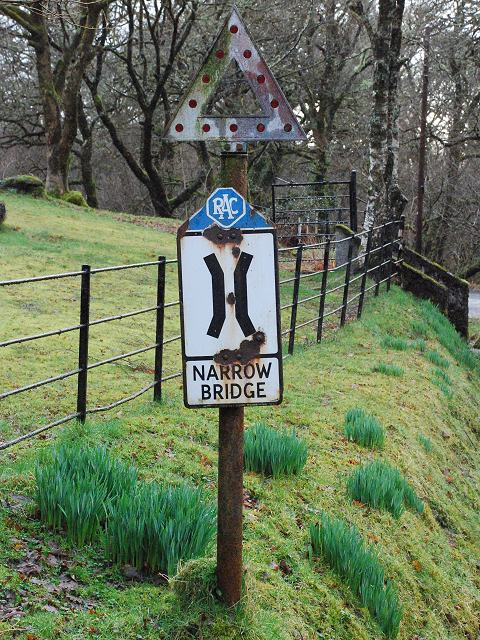
1933-style Narrow Bridge sign placed by RAC, formerly near Portinnisherrich on Loch Awe, Argyll

==== Road Traffic Act 1934 ====
After the Road Traffic Act 1930 had removed completely the speed limit on cars weighing less than 2½ tons, pedestrian fatalities increased, especially in built-up areas. The Road Traffic Act 1934 (RTA 1934) reintroduced a speed limit in built-up areas, setting it at 30 mph.

The act also introduced the driving test, but only for new drivers. In response to the number of pedestrian fatalities in built-up areas, the act introduced pedestrian crossings. These were marked by two rows of studs 8 inches (20 cm) apart and accompanied by Belisha beacons on the pavement, but at this date they weren't necessarily illuminated (some yellow globes were made of metal) let alone flashed like today's current standard.

In 1934, 'Hump Bridge' was added to the warning signs, while 1935 saw the provisions of the RTA 1934 come into force. This led to introduction of three signs of great long-term significance:

- Halt at Major Road Ahead
- 30 mph Speed Limit
- End of 30 mph Speed Limit

As with Slow: Major Road Ahead, Halt at Major Road Ahead was surmounted by a red triangle within a red ring. Its plate was distinctively T-shaped.

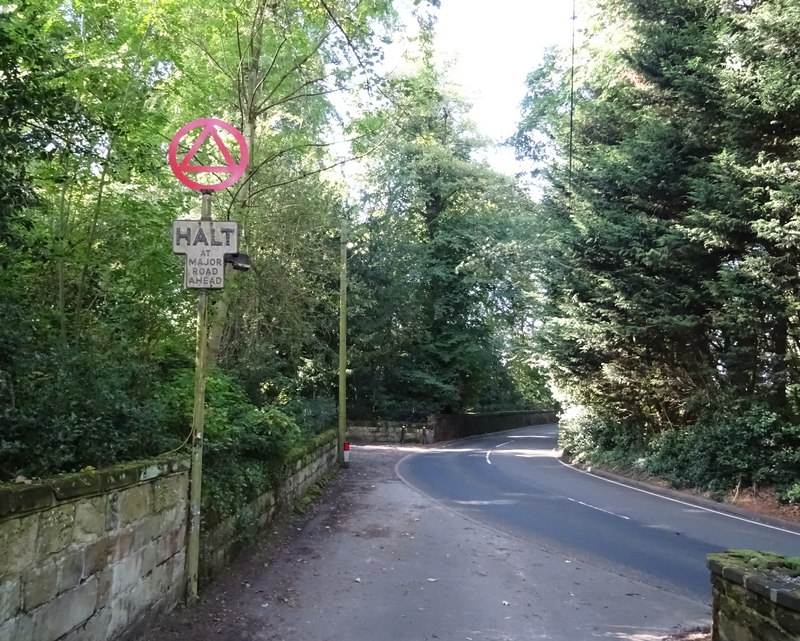
1935-style Halt at Major Road Ahead sign at Poulton Hall, Wirral

=== Signs from 1935 to 1950 ===
A graphic showing all signs commonly used in the late-1930s is here. It illustrates a blog post on the Historic England website about the history of The Highway Code. The signs were illustrated and their use reviewed in the 1944 Report of the Departmental Committee on Traffic Signs.

==== Prohibitory signs: red discs ====
The old red-disc signs for prohibitions on classes of vehicle, especially heavy motors, remained. The plates for these were rectangular with black-on-white text. There was a new plate to apply weight restrictions and speed limits at bridges.

A new colour scheme for plates − white text on a red background − was introduced to prohibit all vehicles from performing certain actions:.

- 'No Entry: One Way Street'
- 'No Right Turn'
- 'No Left Turn'

==== Restrictions and mandatory signs: hollow red rings ====
A hollow red ring with a plate beneath was used:

- to restrict the use of the highway in accordance with a traffic order, regulation or bye-law e.g. a speed limit less than 30 mph (black-on-white portrait-format plate);
- to give mandatory instructions, e.g. Turn Left (white-on-red landscape-format plate).

For restrictions, the text on the plate cited the order, regulation or bye-law which imposed the restriction and gave its gist.

There were two mandatory instruction plates:

- 'Turn Left: One Way Only'
- 'Keep Left: One Way Only'

There was also a smaller white-on-blue Keep Left sign which was used without a hollow red ring.

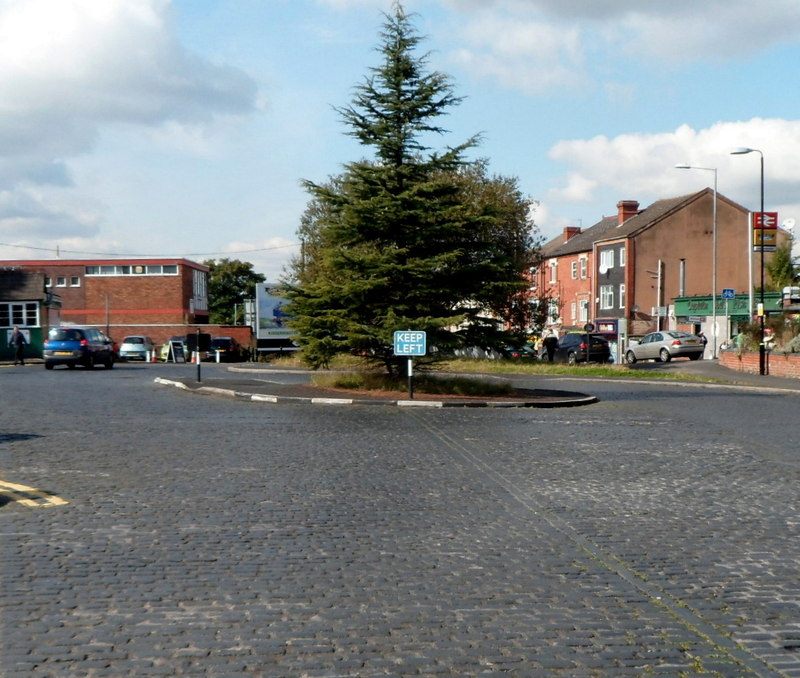
1933-style Keep Left sign outside Kidderminster Town railway station

==== 30 mph speed limit: red ring border to a white disc ====
The 30 mph speed limit sign was the first sign with a symbol inside a red border, in this case a ring. This was to become standard for speed limits after 1960 and for all red-bordered signs from 1964.

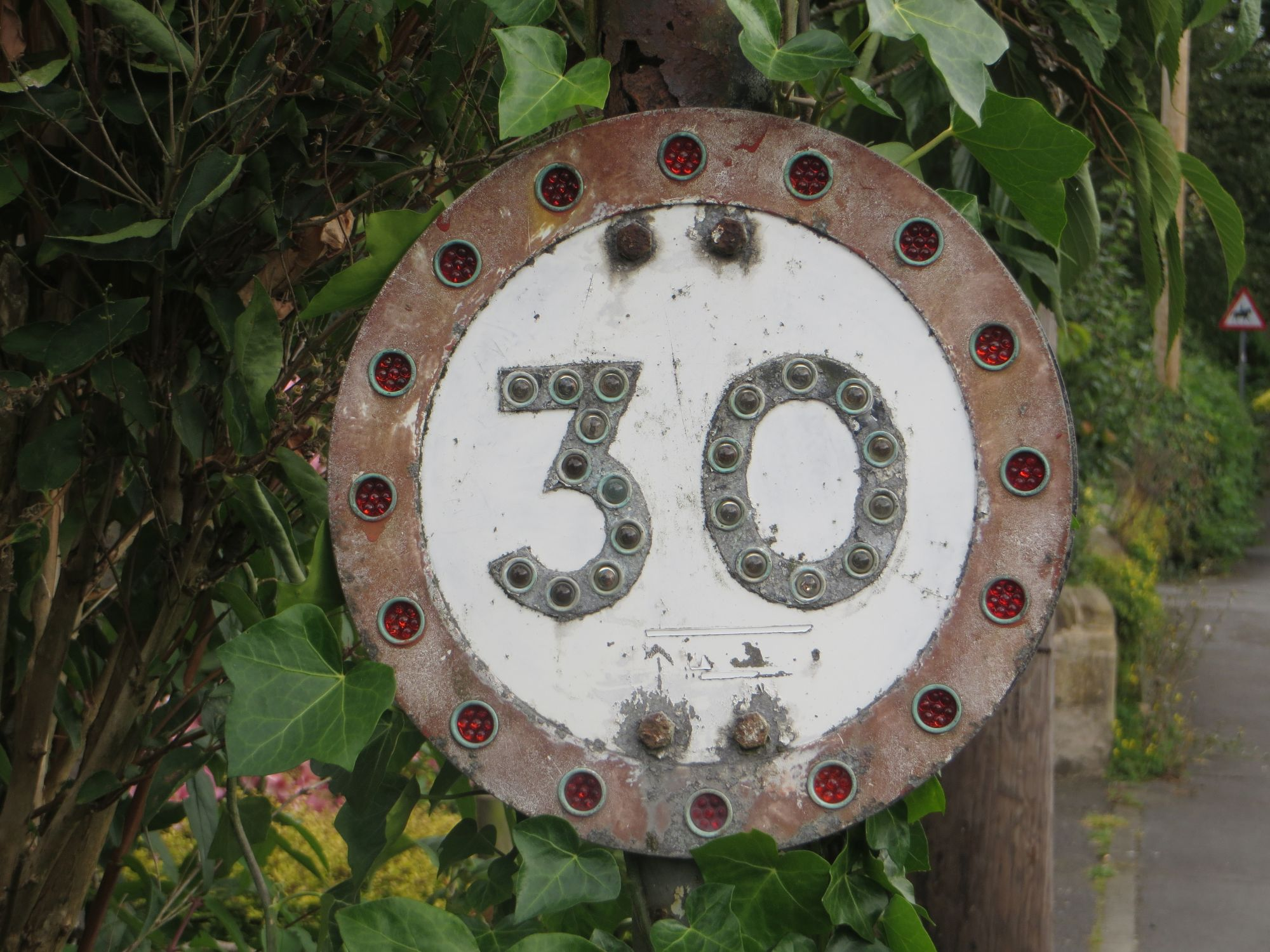
30 mph speed limit sign with reflectors on old A1, West Thirston, Northumberland

The "end of speed limit" sign was identical in size and shape to the speed limit sign so that it could be placed back-to-back with it. As an informatory sign, it was black on white. It remains in use.

==== Warnings with an instruction: red triangle inside a red ring ====
There were two signs surmounted by a red triangle (point upwards) inside a red ring. These were both a warning and an instruction:

- 'Halt at Major Road Ahead'
- 'Slow at Major Road Ahead'

==== Warning signs: red triangles ====
The design of some warning signs from 1921 and the 1930 memorandum was updated. The international 'bend' symbol superseded 'Corner' and 'Double Corner'.

Other warning signs were:

- 'Road Narrows'
- 'Narrow Bridge'
- 'Hump Bridge'
- 'Low Bridge'
- 'Roundabout'
- 'Hospital' (a Maltese cross was used)
- 'No Through Road' (text only)

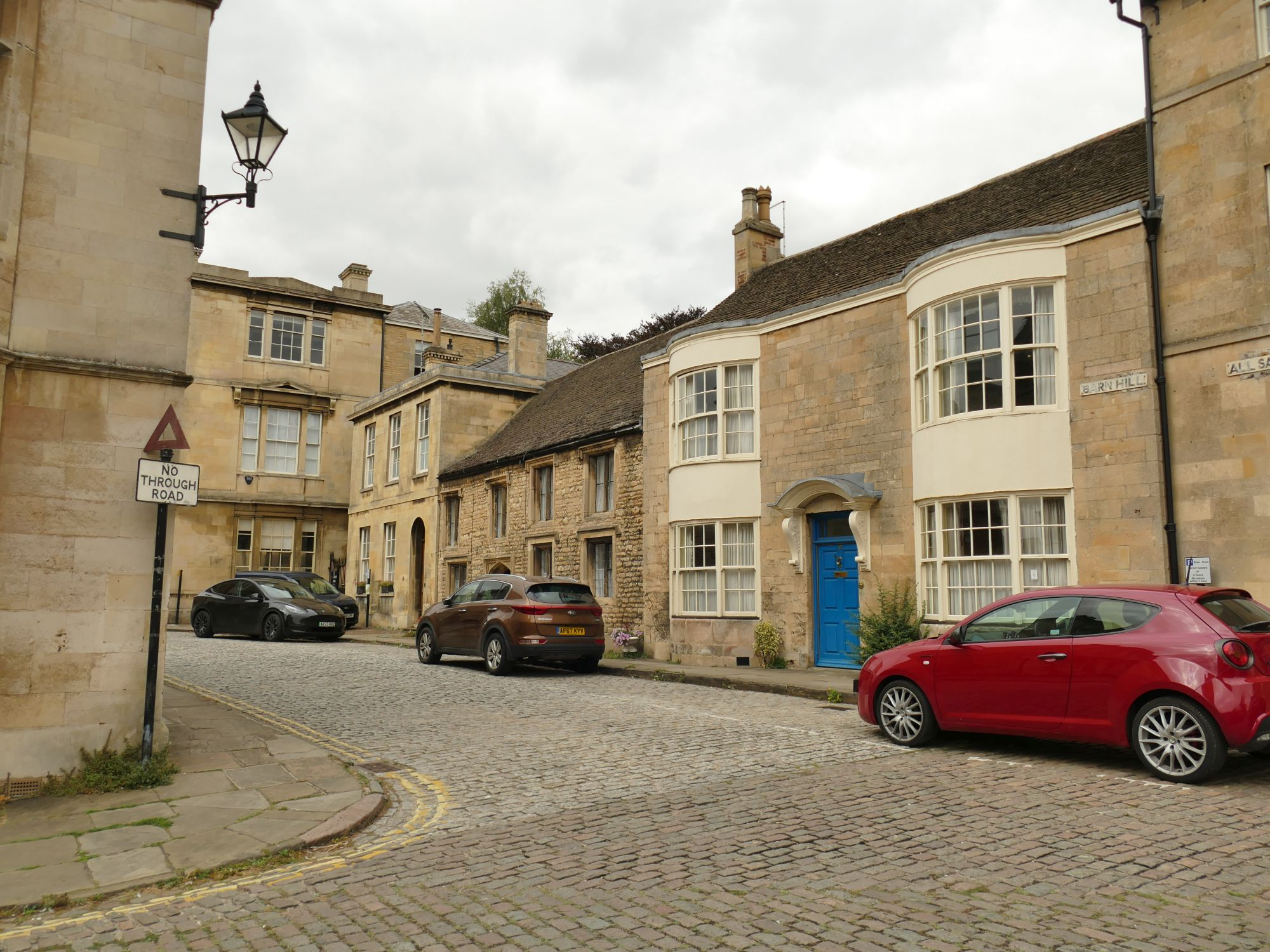
1933-style 'No Through Road' sign, Stamford, Lincs

=== World War II ===
As part of its anti-invasion preparations during World War II, the British government instructed all navigational signposts and railway station signs to be removed, in order to hinder any potential enemy ground movements. Some of the removed cast-iron signs were subsequently melted down for the war effort, while others were damaged or deteriorated during the conflict.

Post-war austerity left many local authorities unable to immediately replace the missing signs, prompting larger motoring associations to embark upon a programme to erect temporary road signs. These temporary signs were not required to conform to the standardisation laid down by the government and usually displayed the motoring association's logo and colour-scheme.

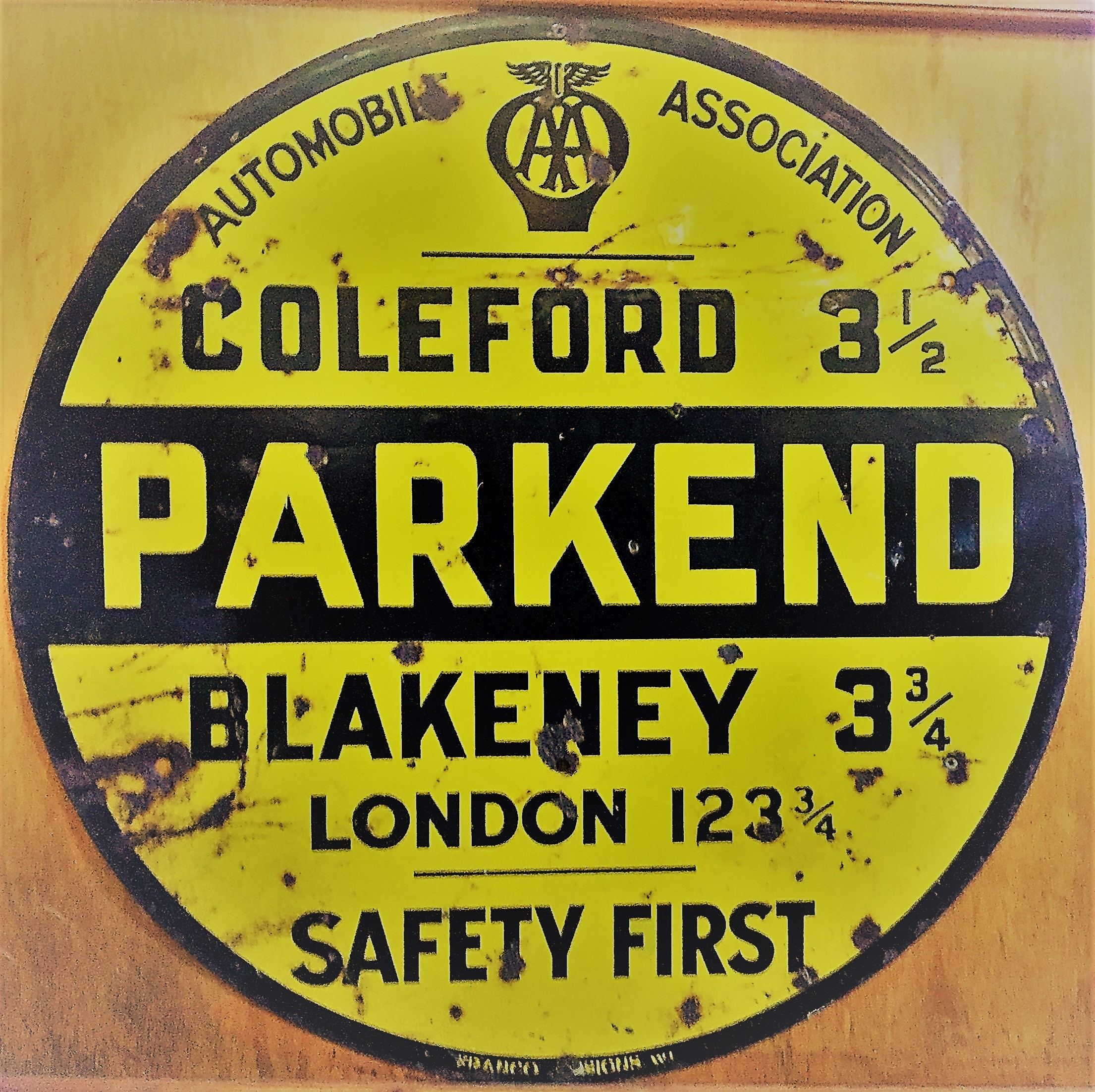
Temporary post-war AA road sign from Parkend, in the Forest of Dean, Gloucestershire

=== Post-war changes ===
==== 1944 Report of the Departmental Committee on Traffic Signs ====
In February 1943, the Minister of War Transport appointed a committee to review the system of road traffic signs and make recommendations. It reported in December 1944 but the report was not published until 1946.

The committee reported that the 1933 'No Entry: One Way Street' sign was often passed unwittingly and that, more generally, white text on a coloured background was insufficiently conspicuous or legible. It recommended the adoption of the 1931 Geneva No Entry sign, but with the words in black across the white bar.

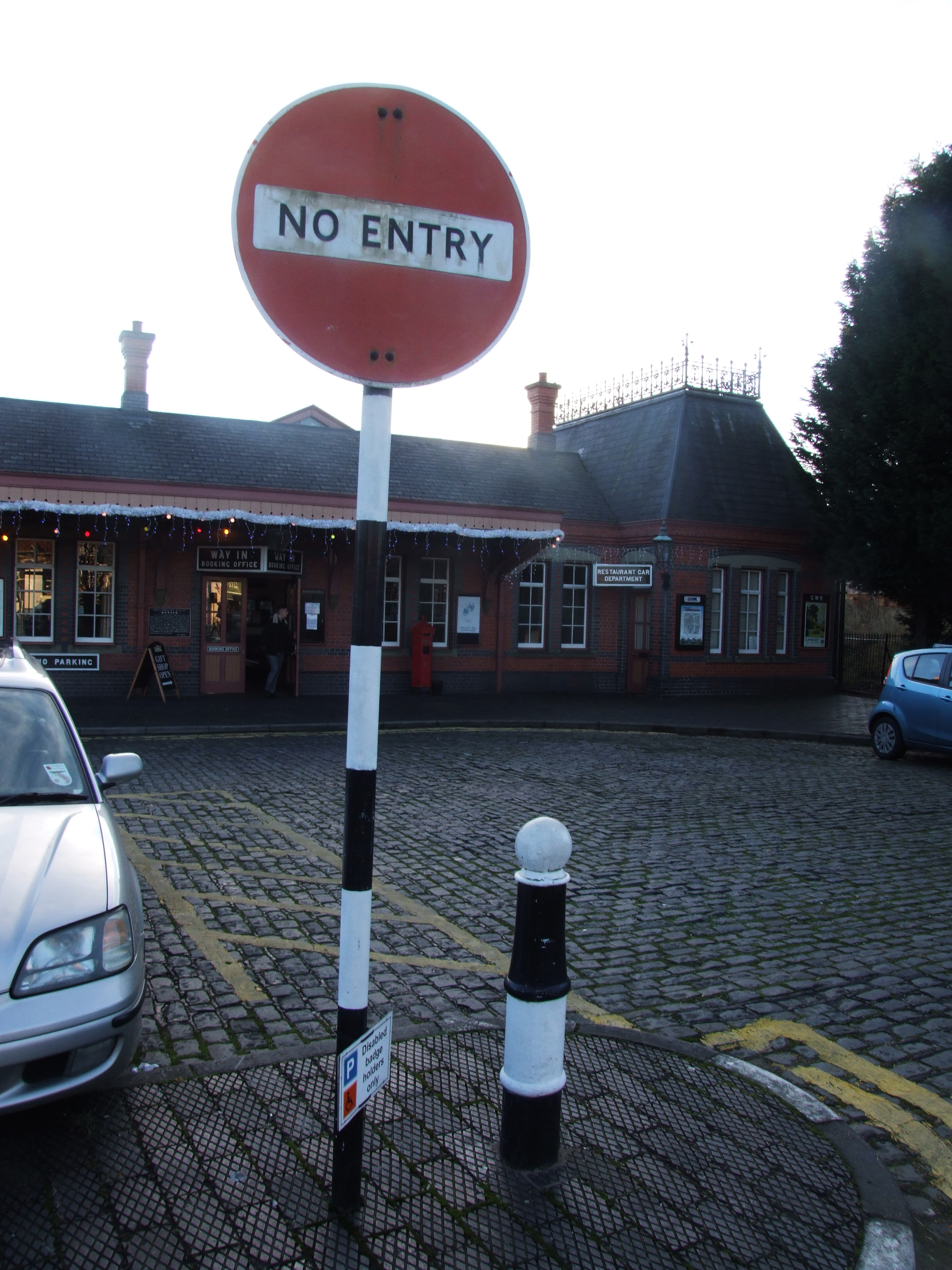
1950s No Entry sign, Kidderminster Town station

Give the experience with white text on coloured backgrounds, the committee recommended black text on white for most signs, including 'No Left Turn' and 'No Right Turn' (formerly white on red):

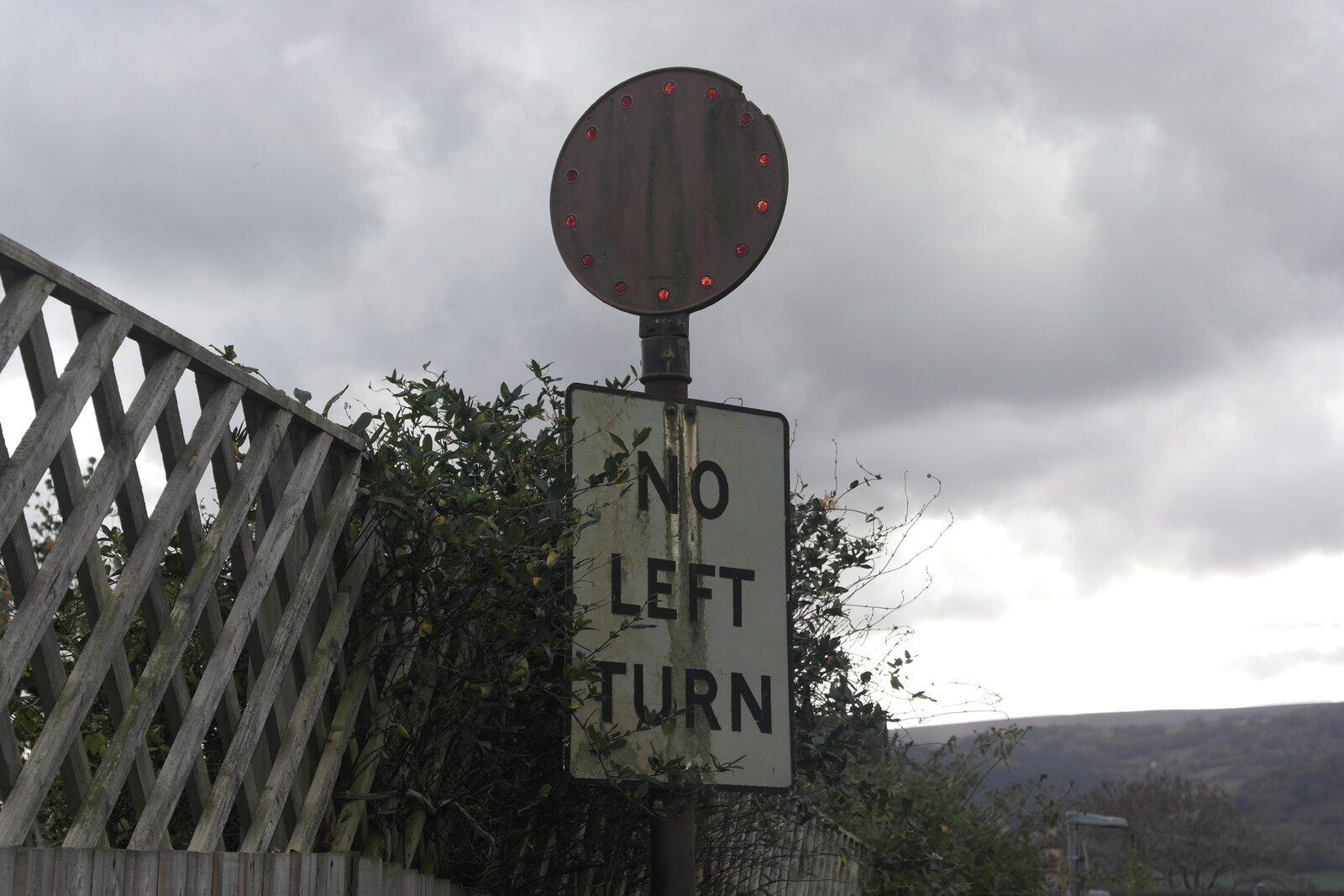
1950s 'No Left Turn' sign, Abergavenny, Monmouthshire

Although the 'No Left Turn' sign illustrated would have been brighter 50 years earlier, it makes understandable the committee's concerns about the visibility of coloured signs, particularly when covered in grime. Retroflective road signs lay 20 years in the future.

White on blue was retained for parking signs. Other white-on-blue signs became black on white, including Turn Left: One Way Only, The image shows it where a side road meets a dual carriageway rather than at the centre of a roundabout.

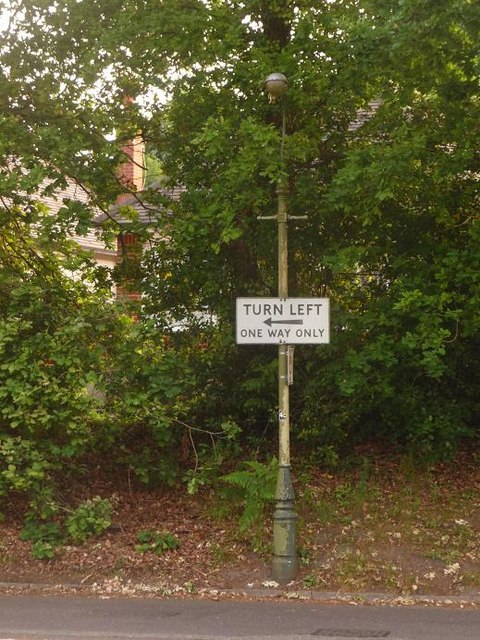
1950s Turn Left: One Way Only sign without its red ring, East Howe, Bournemouth

White on red was retained for (the enlarged) Road Works Ahead and STOP on Stop/Go boards. Red on white was used for the text-only signs Gates Closed and Caution Deep Ford.

The 'Major Road Ahead' signs were surmounted by a red triangle within a red ring. The committee recommended inverting the red triangle to bring the signs into conformity with the 1931 Geneva Convention. This used an inverted triangle (such as the modern Give Way sign) where a road met a more important one.

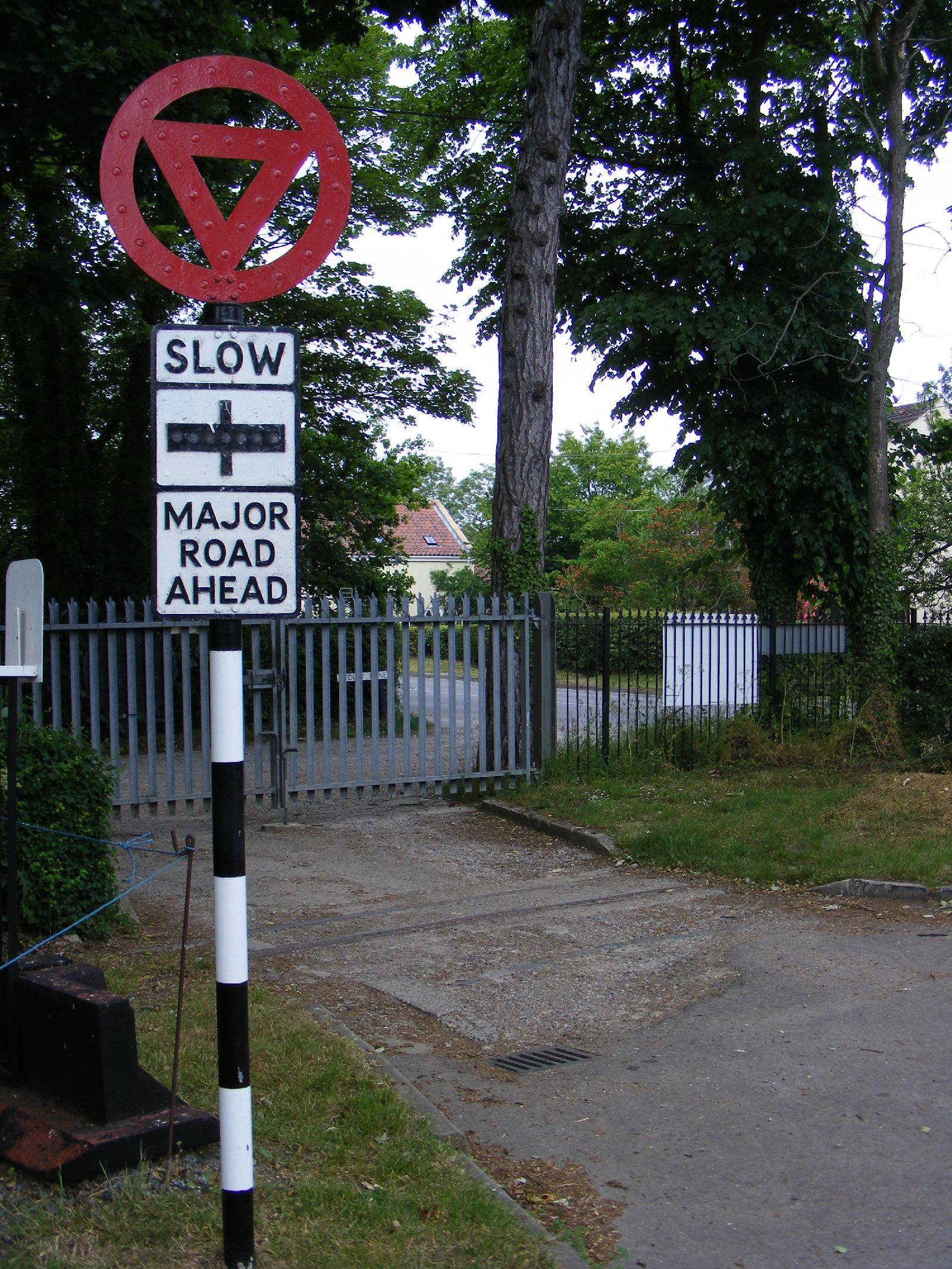
Slow at Major Road Ahead sign with inverted triangle, East Anglia Transport Museum

The committee recommended simplifying the text on the plates beneath the red disc of prohibition signs and the red ring of restriction signs, including speed limits less than 30 mph.

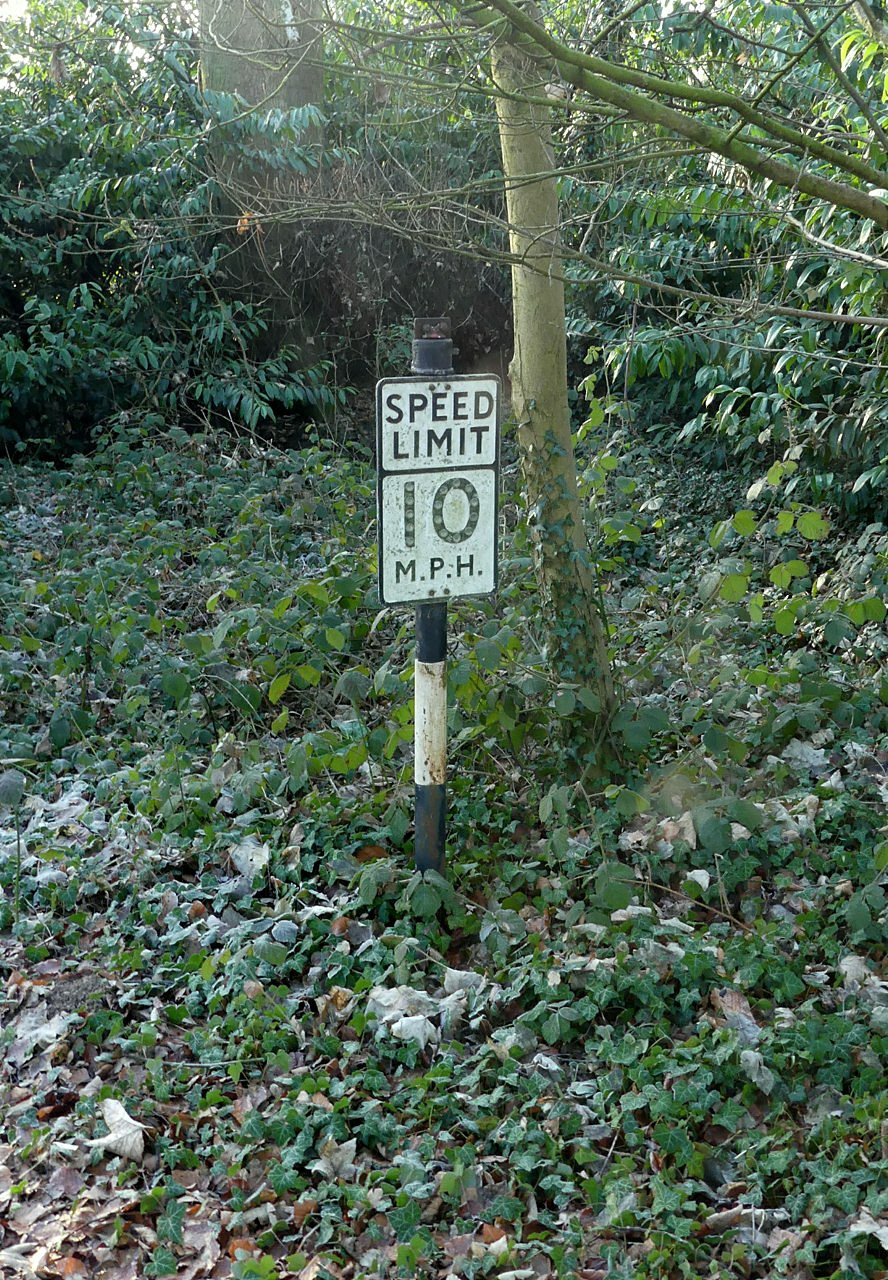
1950s Reduced Speed Limit sign without its red disc, Lambley, Nottinghamshire

The committee repeated the 1931 committee's desire to use separate signs for left- and right-handed single and double bends. Until that was possible, it suggested using a less-tight version of the international bend symbol and proposed a larger (14" x 27") sign using it for bends which continue for up to 2 miles.

New warning signs were to be added for:

- 'Children' (with the flaming torch of knowledge)
- 'Road Works Ahead' (white text on red background)
- 'Caution Deep Ford' (red text on white background)

Steep hills were to have their gradient specified, e.g. '1 in 5'.

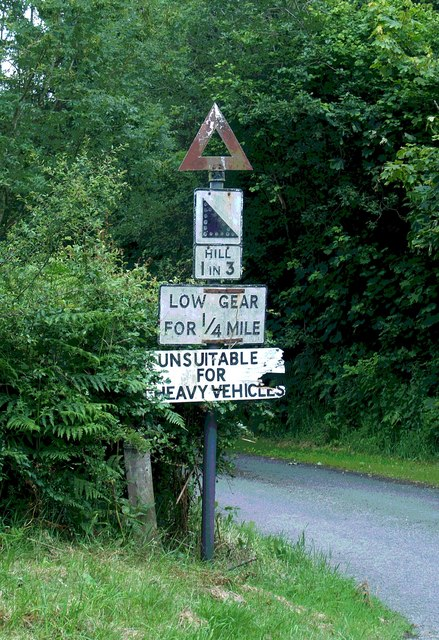
1950s Steep Hill with Gradient sign together with advisory text signs, near Llanfair Talhaiarn, Conwy

The signs for 'Hospital' and 'No Through Road' were to lose their red triangles as they were informatory rather than warnings:

Many symbols on warning plates were adjusted to make them better suited to 7/8 in (22 mm) diameter glass reflectors, the new standard. Symbols were enlarged to accommodate more reflectors. The 'Crossing No Gates' locomotive was changed from 4-6-0 to 0-6-0 to make the wheels larger.

The Belisha beacons at pedestrian crossings were all to be lit at night.

==== 1946 Highway Code ====
In 1946 the Ministry of Transport published a new edition of The Highway Code. This included warning symbols as proposed by the Departmental Committee, including the less-tight form of the international Bend symbol. The warning signs were brought into use in 1947 by special authorisation.

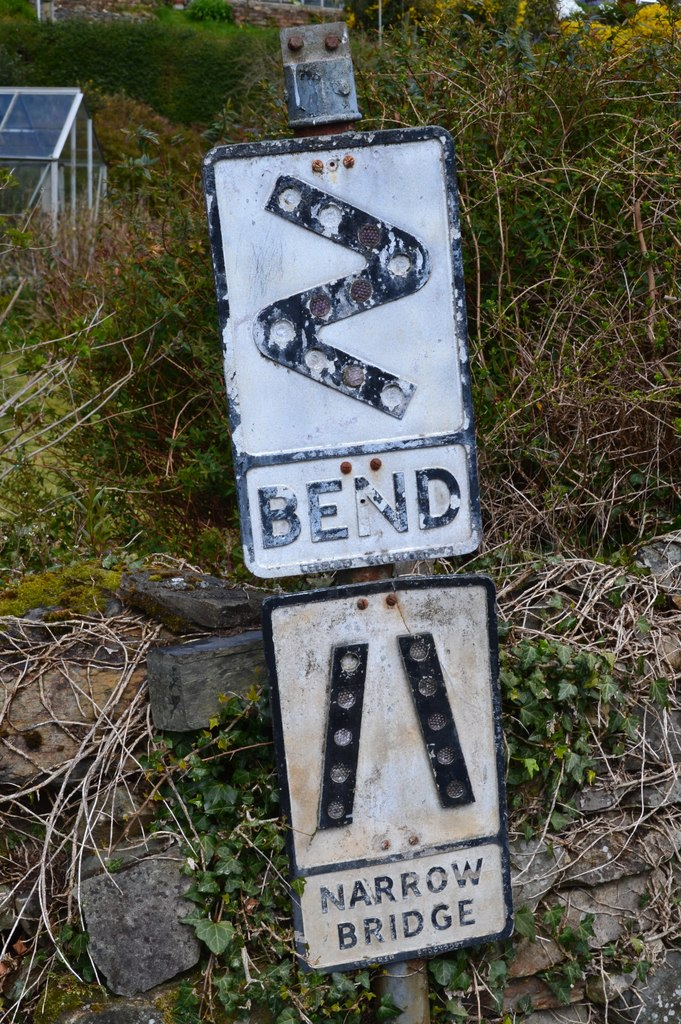
Post-war Bend and Narrow Bridge signs, Llanelltyd, Gwynedd

==== 1949 Geneva Conference ====
A UN World Conference of Road and Motor transport was held in Geneva in 1949. This led to the issuing of a Protocol on Road Signs and Signals which was signed by 27 nations, including most of those in Europe, but not the UK.

The protocol adopted signs based on symbols without words, including separate symbols for left- and right-handed single and double bends. The ministry remained opposed to symbols with words and considered prohibitive the cost of replacing all road signs at a time of economic stringency. Symbol-only signs were to be recommended by the Worboys Committee in 1963.

==== 1950 Traffic Signs Regulations ====
The Traffic Signs (Size, Colour and Type) Regulations 1950 (SI 1950/953) largely implemented the recommendations of the 1944 Report of the Departmental Committee on Traffic Signs. The only reference to signs for bend was to validate signs with the 1926 Paris Convention bend which were already in place.

The new 'No Entry' sign came into use, along with the inversion of the triangle within the ring in the 'Major Road' signs. 'No Right Turn' and 'No Left Turn' were shown beneath red discs while reduced speed limits were show beneath red rings. The text on prohibition plates was simplified and no longer cited the relevant legislation.

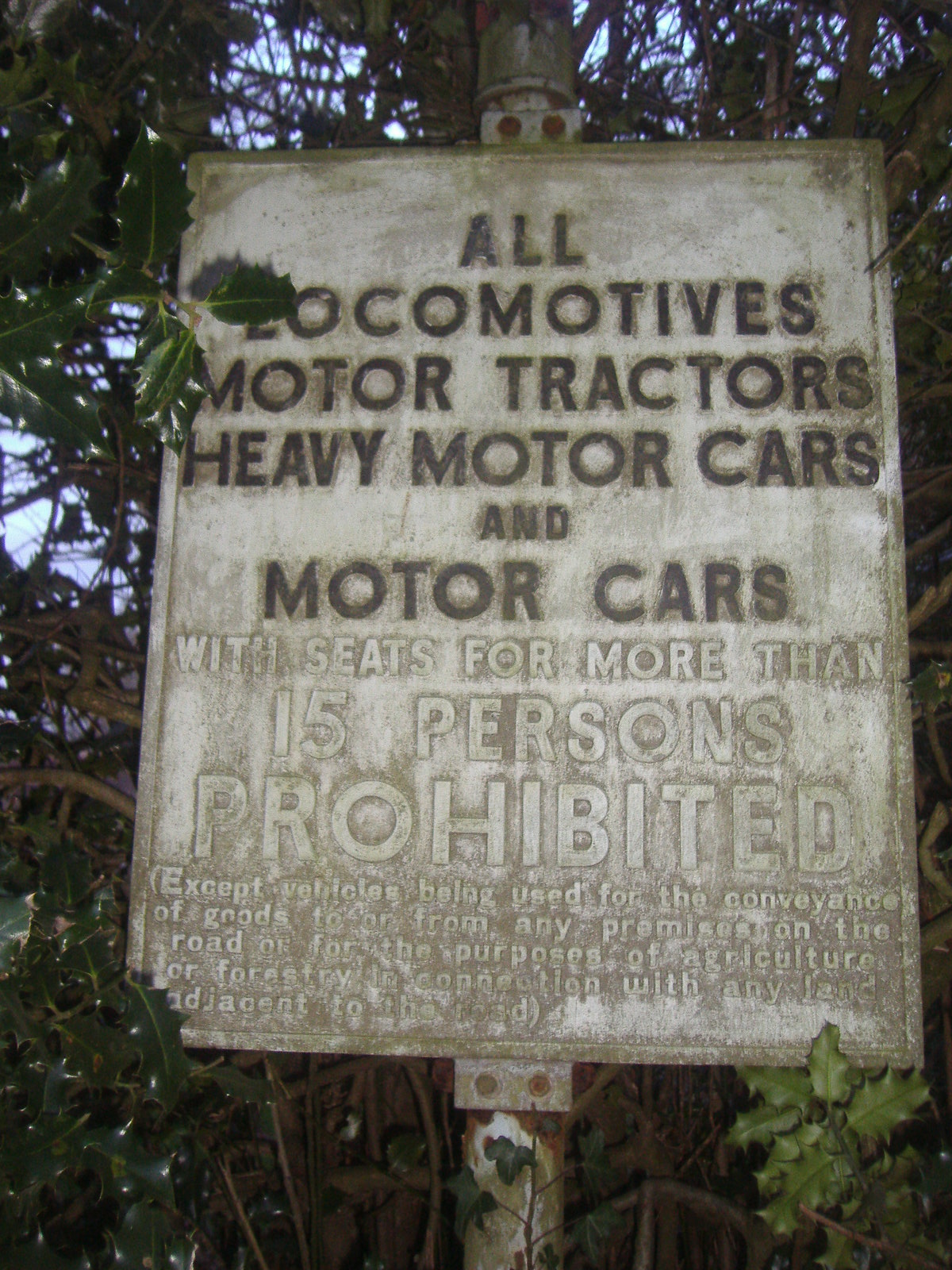
1950s Prohibition plate without citation to legislation, Abinger, Surrey

Text-only warning signs were introduced for 'Single Track Road with Passing Places', 'Single Line Traffic' and 'Swing Bridge'.

Informatory signs were added for the end of reduced speed limits.

==== 1954 Highway Code ====
The 1954 Highway Code was published after pedestrian crossings had acquired their zebra stripes (the first was installed in Slough in 1951) and the Belisha beacons flashed.

There were four pages of coloured signs, which generally followed the 1950 regulations but anticipated the 1957 regulations in some respects.

The 1926 Paris Convention bend had finally been consigned to history, except in the less-tight form used in the larger-format sign to show bends for a specified distance. In its place were the left- and right-handed single and double bends which the Ministry had been wanted to use in the 1933 Regulations.

Speed limits below 30 mph were now shown beneath red discs rather than red rings.

==== 1957 Traffic Signs Regulations ====
The Traffic Signs Regulations and General Directions 1957 (SI 1957/13) (TSRGD 1957) made design changes to many signs and simplified the text of prohibition plates. The crossroads sign changed from "X" to "+". Single and double bends finally appeared in regulations in the forms which the Maybury Committee of the early 1930s had wanted.

The torch symbol for 'School' became a schoolboy and girl marching off a kerb.

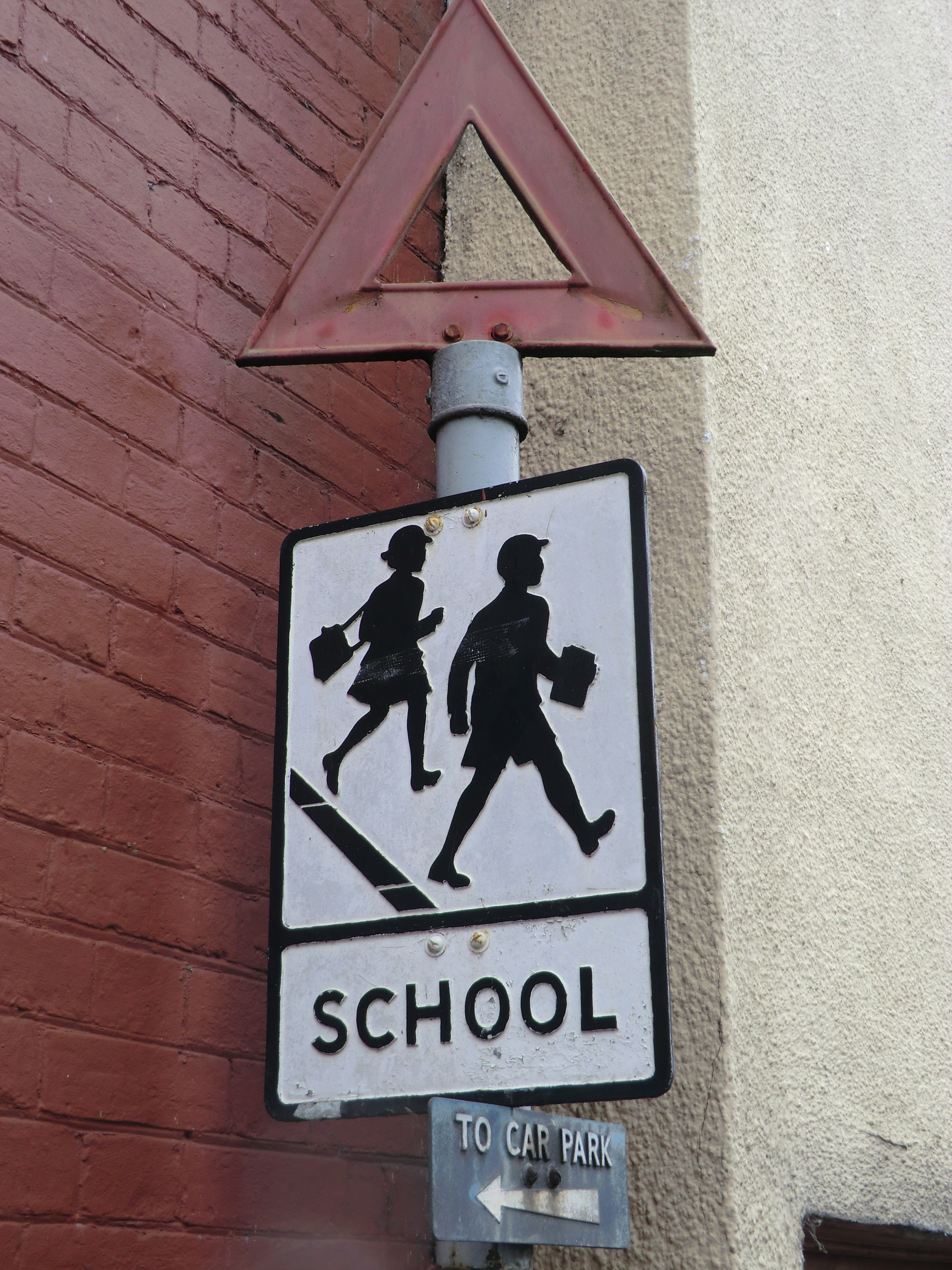
Post-1957 School sign and earlier cast-metal To Car Park sign, Glastonbury, Somerset.

Children were represented as a boy and girl playing handball by the kerb.

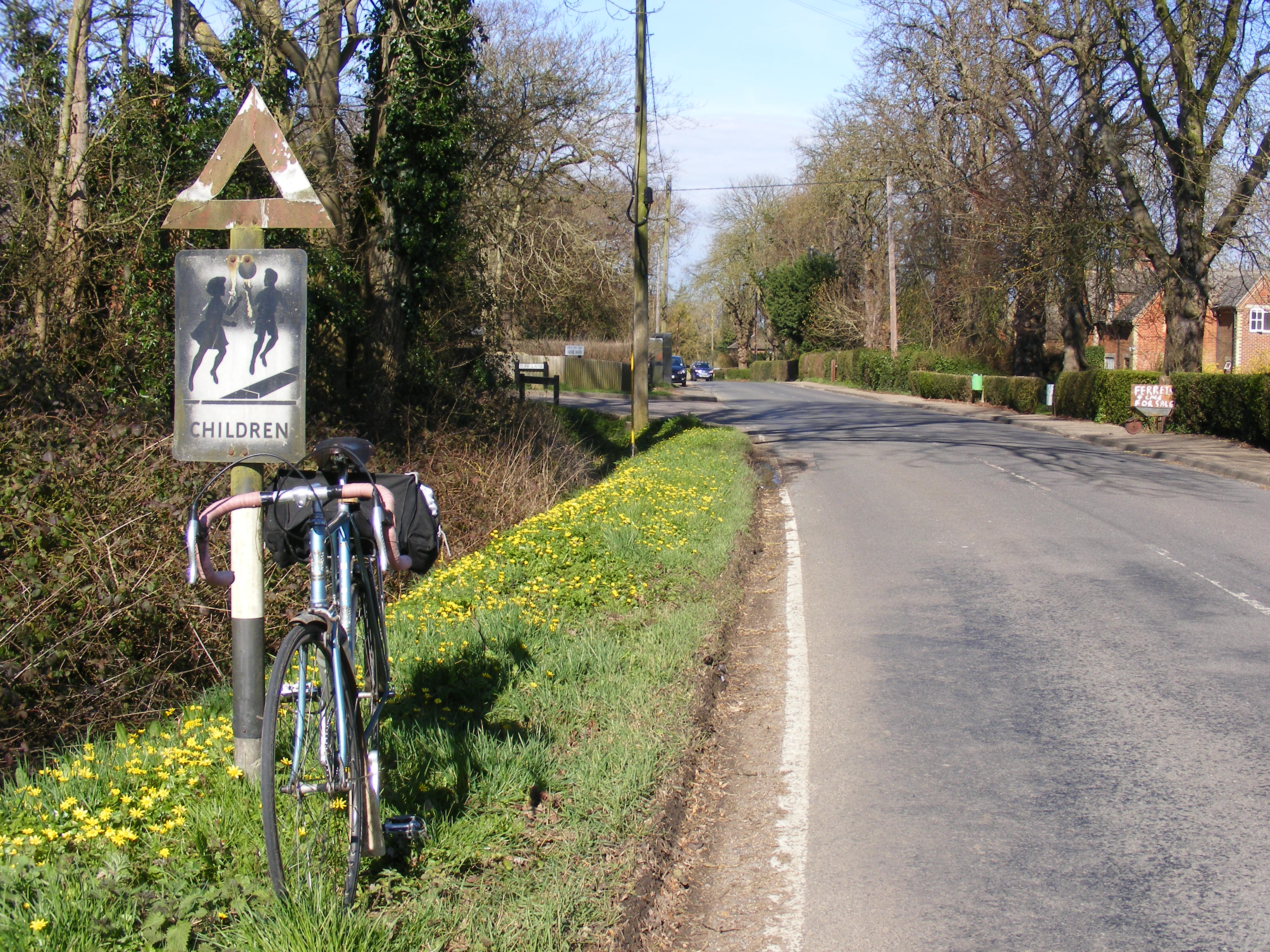
Post-1957 Children sign, Hatley St George, Cambridgeshire

One sign which had been considered by the wartime departmental committee, but rejected for lack of need, was Tram Pinch. This is where road-space is progressively reduced by a tram coming closer to the kerb. The sign was added in the regulations, ironically when trams were fast disappearing. A photo of the sign in use in Blackpool in 1962 can be seen here.

==== 1958-1960 Reform of speed limit signs ====
1958 saw the introduction of 40 mph speed limits on certain, mostly dual-carriageway, roads in London. A distinctive new sign from the Traffic Signs (40 mph Speed Limit) Regulations 1958 (SI 1958/302) was used, resulting in three distinct formats of speed limit sign.

In 1960, order was imposed: henceforth under the Traffic Signs (Speed Limits) Regulations 1960 (SI 1960/1124), all speed limit signs were to be of the format first used in 1935 for 30 mph signs. This differed from the UN Protocol sign only in the font used.

==== Manufacture of traffic signs ====
Early road signs were usually cast iron, but this was increasingly displaced by cast aluminium in the 1930s. Cast signs were designed to be maintained by being repainted with the raised lettering and symbol easily picked out by an untrained hand.

An alternative to casting and painting was vitreous enamelled sheet iron or steel.(as with the AA and RAC signs) In the 1950s cast signs were quickly displaced by sheet metal (usually aluminium) which could be embossed to simulate casting.

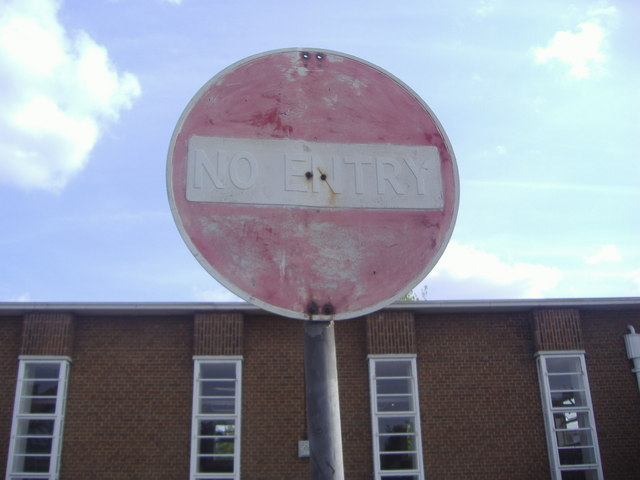
No Entry sign at Kenton Library, London. The embossed letters across the central band which had been black were painted white after Worboys.

Later, sheet metal signs were coated with adhesive plastics, which could be made reflective, famously by Scotchlite. Such signs had become almost universal by the reforms of the early 1960s.

=== Direction signs to 1963 ===
Pre-Worboys direction signs can occasionally be seen.

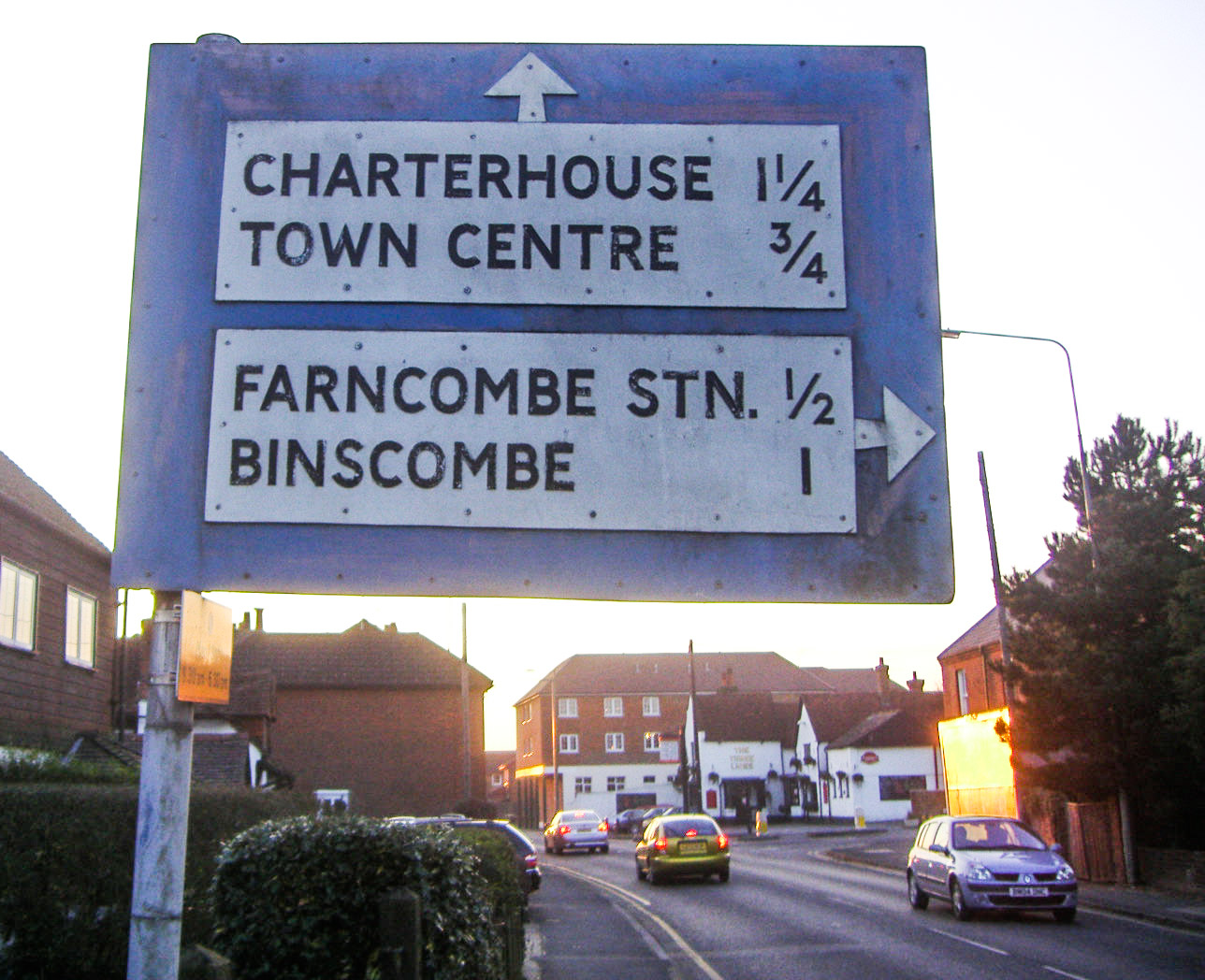
A pre-Worboys road sign on Meadrow, in Farncombe. Only a handful of these pre-1963 signs still exist.

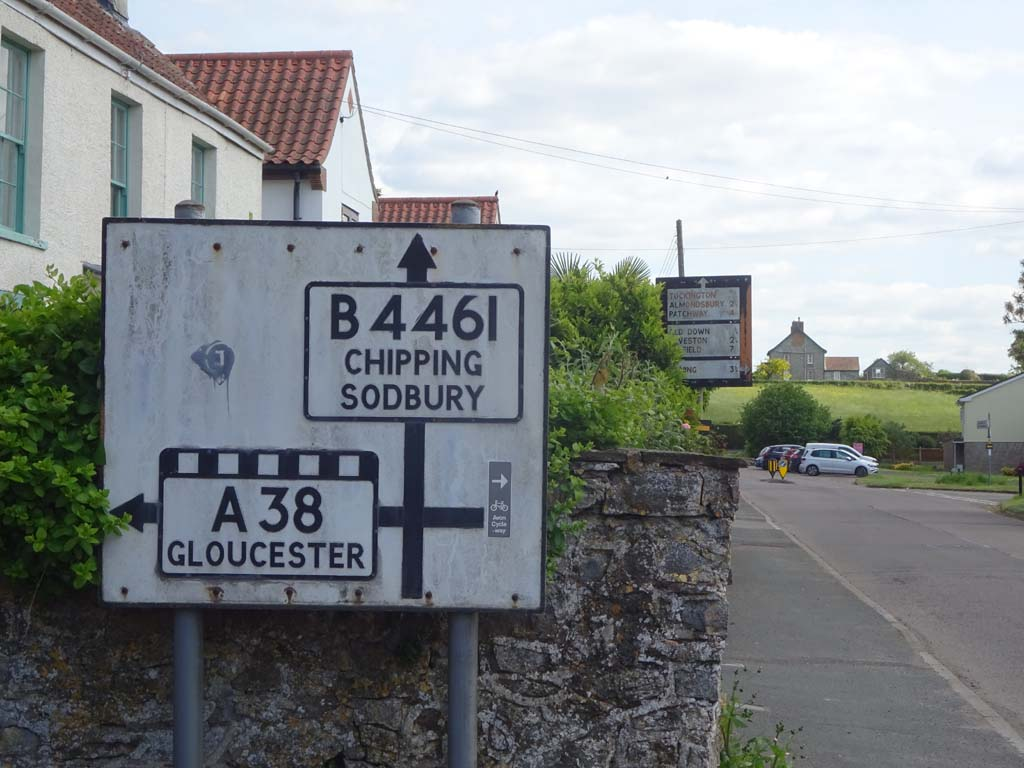
New Road, Olveston, South Gloucestershire

=== 1960s reforms ===
The major reform of UK road signage to better reflect European practice happened in two stages. The first was associated with the first motorway construction project and the development of a signage system for it by the Anderson Committee of 1957. Although it was additional to the existing signage, it set several benchmarks that were developed under the Worboys Committee of 1963 that was largely responsible for the road signage system effected from 1964, which is still current.

Until Worboys, the most notable difference between Continental European and UK signs was the use of symbols without text wherever possible, eliminating language and making the signs international. UK signs (other than the newer speed limit signs) had two parts: the shape at top and the plate beneath, while Continental signs had the symbol within the shape.

The Worboys Committee recommended that the Continental practice was adopted in the UK. The 'New Traffic Signs' of 1964 were part of the most comprehensive reformation of the UK streetscape ever. Unlike previous government efforts to regulate signage, which tended to be cumulative, Worboys argued a modernist position of starting from a clean slate, with all previous signs being deemed obsolete and subject to total and systematic replacement.

As a result, local authorities were charged with massive resignage programmes. Order and Prohibition signs were almost all replaced within a couple of years, with the warning and direction signs taking longer. Few pre-1964 warning signs survived more than about ten years; those which survive today tend to be in obscure and remote locations.

More direction signs have survived as their replacement was not deemed essential. Some have now become part of local heritage and are expensively preserved.

The design of traffic signs currently in use was mainly developed in the late 1950s and the early 1960s. Additional colour-coding on direction signs was introduced in the mid-1980s. There were three major steps in the development of the system.

- The Anderson Committee established the motorway signing system.
- The Worboys Committee reformed signing for existing all-purpose roads.
- The Guildford Rules introduced features to indicate different categories of route.

=== 1957-1962: Anderson Committee ===
In 1957, a government committee was formed to design signs for the new motorway network. A system was needed that could be easily read at high speed. Colin Anderson, chairman of P&O, was appointed chairman; T. G. Usborne, of the Ministry of Transport, had charge of proceedings.

Two graphic designers were commissioned to design the system of signage: Jock Kinneir and his assistant (and later business partner) Margaret Calvert. The new signs were first used on the Preston bypass in 1958. These were the signs allocated to motorways by the Anderson Committee in 1962. They were replaced in 1975.

=== 1963: Worboys Committee ===
The UK government formed another committee in 1963 to review signage on all British roads. It was chaired by Sir Walter Worboys of Imperial Chemical Industries. The result was a document that defined traffic signing in Britain, the Traffic Signs Regulations and General Directions (TSRGD). It was first introduced on 1 January 1965 but has been updated many times since. It is comparable with the Manual on Uniform Traffic Control Devices in the United States. The TSRGD is a Statutory Instrument that prescribes the sign faces and permitted variants that may be used on UK roads.

The TSRGD is supported by the Traffic Signs Manual (TSM), which consists of eight separately-published chapters which provide "the codes to be followed in the use, siting, and illumination of signs both on all-purpose roads and motorways. It also covers temporary signs for use in connection with road works, in an emergency by the police, and temporary route signing by motoring organisations and highway authorities."

=== 1994: Guildford Rules ===
To eliminate sign clutter in the mid-1980s, a colour-coding system was developed to indicate different route types on a single sign. The system, also adopted in Ireland, became known as Guildford Rules, after trials in Guildford, Surrey. In July 1994, the system was officially adopted across the United Kingdom by Local Transport Note (LTN) 1/94, The Design and Use of Directional Informatory Signs. This LTN superseded designs laid out in the 1981 TSRGD and Circular Roads 7/75.

Among the changes blue bordered 'local direction signs' were eliminated, merged with the black bordered non-primary route sign. This was due to years of issues with inconsistent use of blue-bordered signs and a lack of consensus as to the difference between a 'local direction' and a 'non-primary route'. The inclusion of warning and regulatory signs on direction signs was expanded to more directional signs and improvement instructions on incorporating them onto direction signs. A list of regional destinations and primary destinations was provided to improve consistency.

LTN 1/94 required that any pre-Worboys (pre-1964) directional signs were to be replaced as soon as possible, and no later than 1 January 2005. Local direction signs with blue borders were to be replaced by 1 January 2015, and all other changes having no specific deadline for change, aside from a in-theory 2015 goal; owing to the general life span of a traffic sign dating to the 1980s and early 1990s having lapsed by that point.

Revised lists of primary destinations for England and Scotland were released in March 2012. The Guildford Rules are still referred to for guidance on direction sign implementation, as the Department for Transport has not published Chapter 2 'Informatory signs' for the Traffic Signs Manual, covering direction signs as of June 2025.

== Design ==
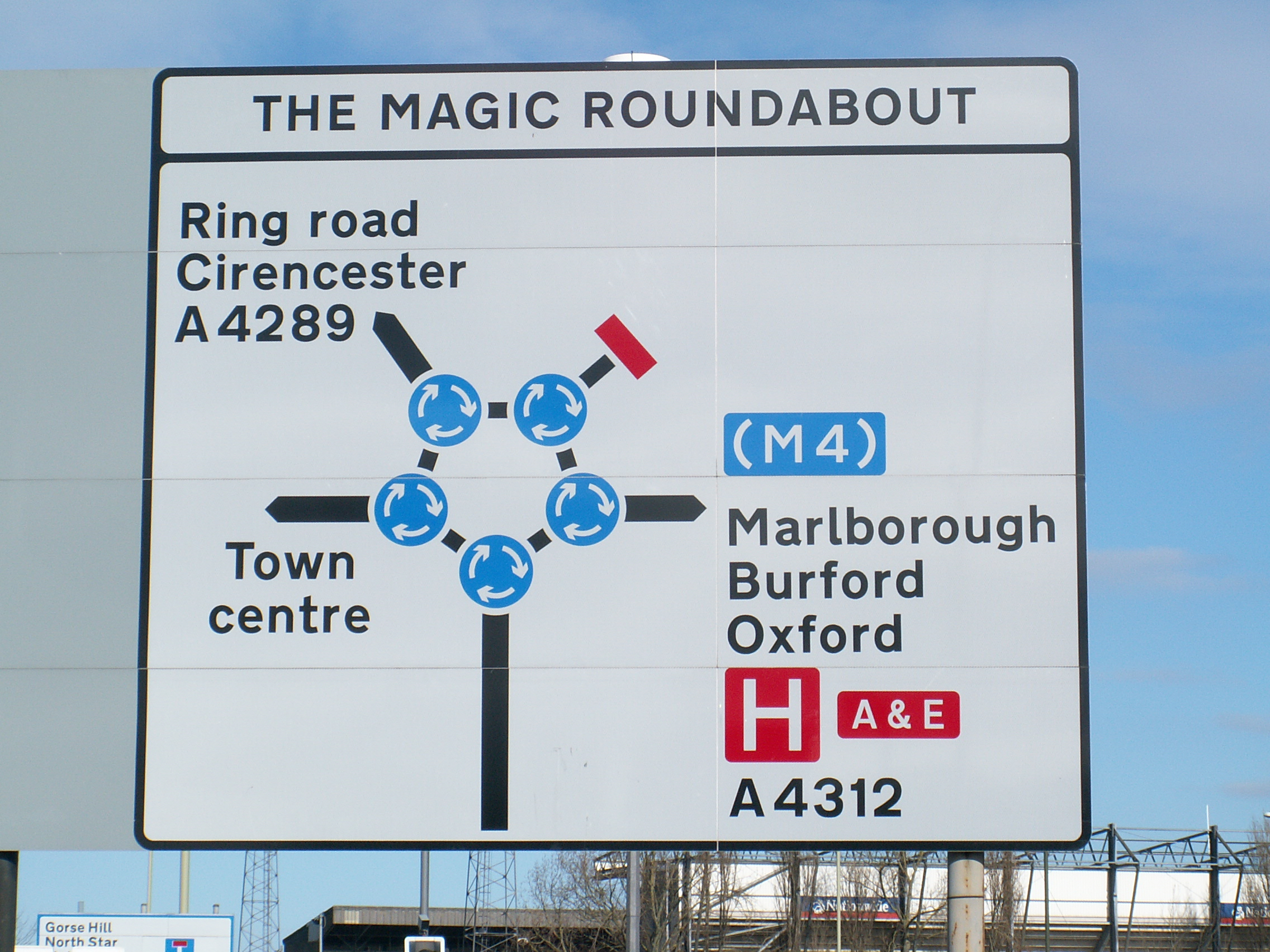
A sign at the Magic Roundabout in Swindon incorporating mini-roundabouts into signage. (The correct method, introduced in the 1994 TSRGD, is to use a black disc with a central white dot for each mini-roundabout.) This peculiarity is common in Wiltshire.

Detailed guidelines govern road signs in the United Kingdom. The basic units of measurement used by sign designers and typographers are the 'x-height' (the height of the lower case letter 'x') and the 'stroke width' (sw) (4 sw = 1 x-height). The sizes of borders, symbols and arrows and the spacing and layout of the sign face are expressed in sw, so that all the elements remain in proportion. The x-height of a sign is dictated mainly by the speed of traffic approaching it; hence 300 mm (12 inches) x-heights are common on motorways, whereas parking signs are mostly at 15 mm (1/2 inch) or 20 mm (3/4 inch) x-height.

=== Shape ===
Almost all signs have rounded corners.

=== Units of measurement ===
The United Kingdom uses mostly imperial units on road signs for distance measurements and speed limits. Vehicle weight limits are signed only in metric (TSRGD 1981) but older signs with height, width and length restrictions may show metric units in addition to imperial. For distances only miles and yards are used. From March 2015, all new height, width and length restrictions must have dual metric-imperial units.

Whilst yards are used on signs, the DfT's TSM (Traffic Signs Manual) generally places temporary road work distance signs at their respective places in metres (within an allowed 10% tolerance), meaning a temporary road sign indicating 200 yards (180 metres) actually indicates 200 metres (220 yards).

=== Colours ===
Three colour combinations are used on Worboys direction signs depending upon the category of the route. All roads are categorised as either motorways (white on blue), primary routes (white on dark green with yellow route numbers), or non-primary routes (black on white).

TSRGD 1994 also prescribed a system of white-on-brown direction signs for tourist and recreational attractions. TSRGD 2002 updated this and introduced a system of black-on-yellow signs for roadworks. As of 2026, TSRGD 2016 is the version in force.

On advance direction signs, as introduced under the Guildford Rules, the background colour indicates the category of route on which it is located. On all directional signs, destination names are placed on the colour appropriate to the category of route used from that junction. A panel of one colour on a different colour of background, therefore, indicates a change of route status. A smaller area of colour, called a patch, surrounds a bracketed route number (but not its associated destination) to indicate a higher status route that is joined some distance away. A patch may only be coloured blue or green.

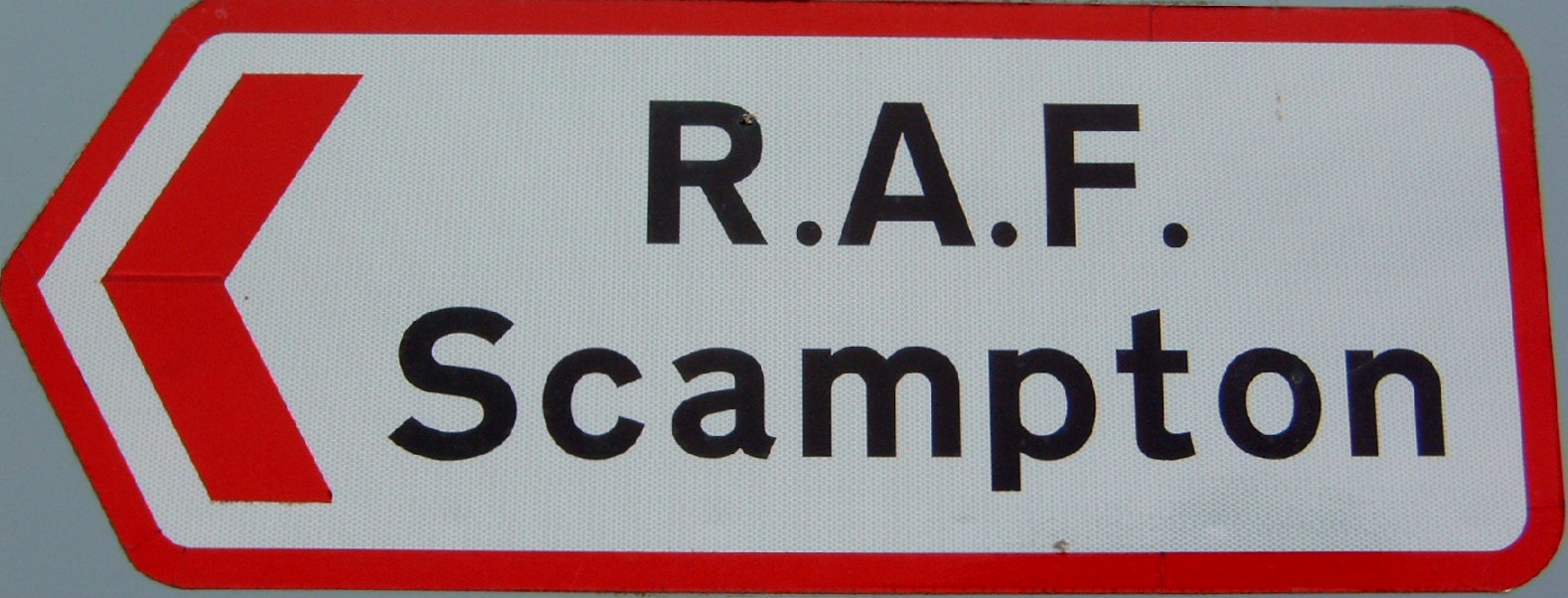
Ministry of Defence road sign

Signs indicating a temporary change, such as roadworks or route diversions, are denoted with a yellow background. Usually, these signs use a simple black on yellow colour code, more complex signage use the conventional signs superimposed onto a yellow background.

In some areas, such as the Dartmoor National Park, additional signs and colours are used to distinguish road conditions. In addition to the national colour schemes, the park also uses white signs with a light blue border and text to denote routes suitable for medium-sized vehicles and white signs with a brown border and text for routes suitable for cars and small vehicles only. The park also uses fingerpost signs for routes suitable for local traffic only. These routes are publicised in park leaflets and other media.

For ease of reference, the main colour-coding rules may be summarised as below:

Sign background	Border	Lettering	Usage	Ruleset
Blue	White	White	Motorways M1, A1(M)	Anderson
Green	White	White (with yellow route numbers)	Primary routes A2	Worboys
White	Black	Black	Non-primary routes A335, B190	Worboys
White	Black	Black	Local destinations	
White	Blue	Black	Local destinations	Worboys, now defunct and replaced by above
Brown	White	White	Tourist attractions	
Black	White	White	HGV routes	
White	Red	Black	Ministry of Defence sites	
Yellow	Black	Black	Temporary/diversion	Guildford

The colour-coding for panels on signs may be summarised as below:

Panel background	Border	Lettering	Usage	Ruleset
Blue	White	White	Motorways	Guildford
Green	White	White	Primary routes	Guildford
Brown	White	White	Tourist attractions	Guildford
White	Red	Black	Ministry of Defence sites	Guildford

=== Typefaces ===
Two typefaces are specified for British road signs: Transport and Motorway.

Transport is a mixed-case font and is used for all text on fixed permanent signs except route numbers on motorway signs. It is used in two weights: Transport Medium (for light text on dark backgrounds) and Transport Heavy (for dark text on light backgrounds).

Motorway has a limited character set consisting of just numbers and a few letters and symbols needed to show route numbers; it has elongated characters and is designed to add emphasis to route numbers on motorways. Motorway is used to sign all route numbers on motorways themselves, and may also be used on non-motorway roads to sign directions in which motorway regulations apply immediately (such as motorway slip roads). Motorway Permanent is light characters on a dark background; Motorway Temporary is dark on light.

Transport Medium and Motorway Permanent were developed for the Anderson Committee and appeared on the first motorway signs. The other two typefaces are similar but have additional stroke width in the letters to compensate for light backgrounds. These typefaces are the only ones permitted on road signs in the UK. Although signs containing other typefaces do appear occasionally in some places, they are explicitly forbidden in government guidelines and are technically illegal.

=== Language ===
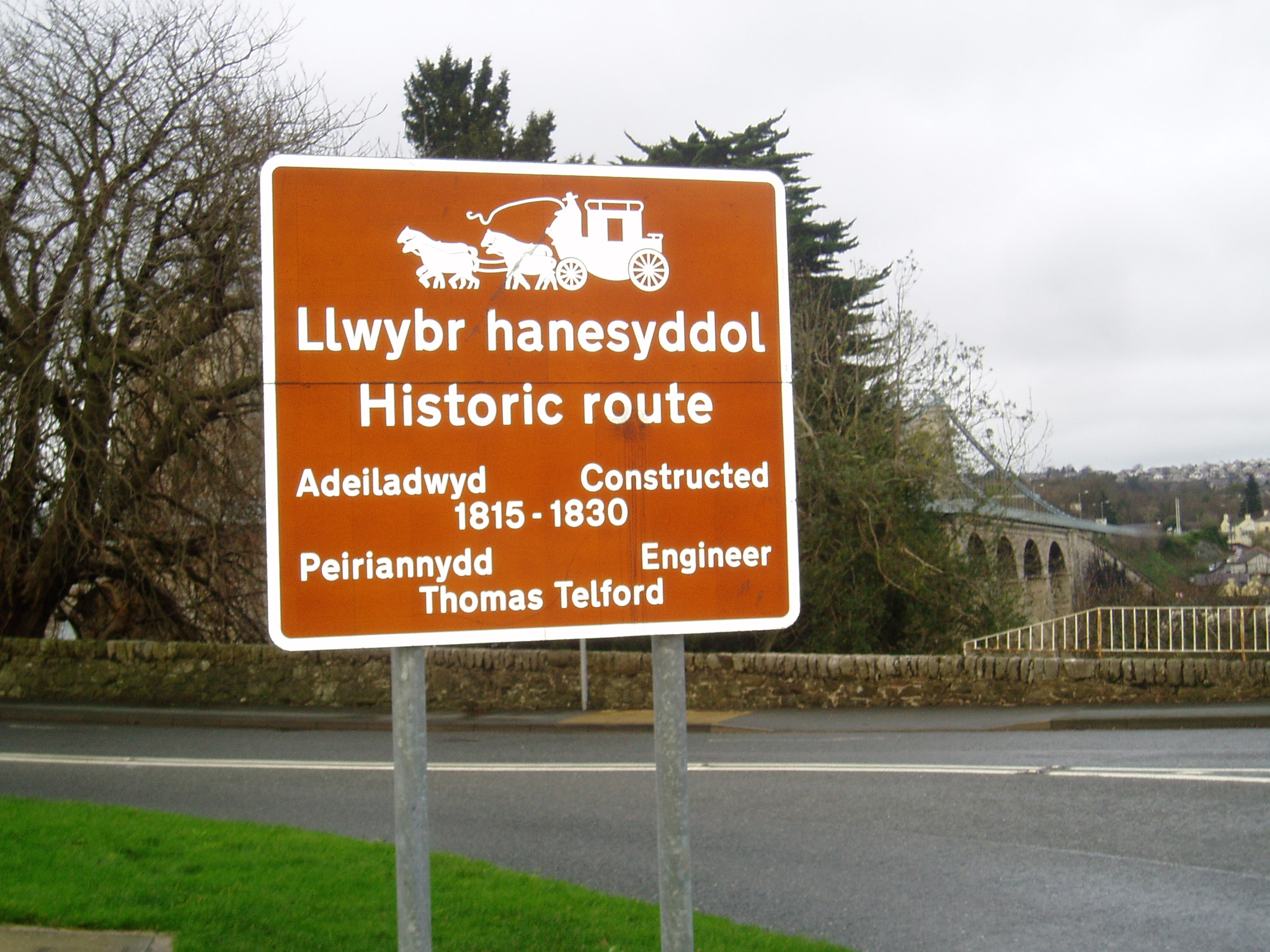
Signs in Wales are generally bilingual, such as this "historic route" sign on the A5 near Menai Bridge.

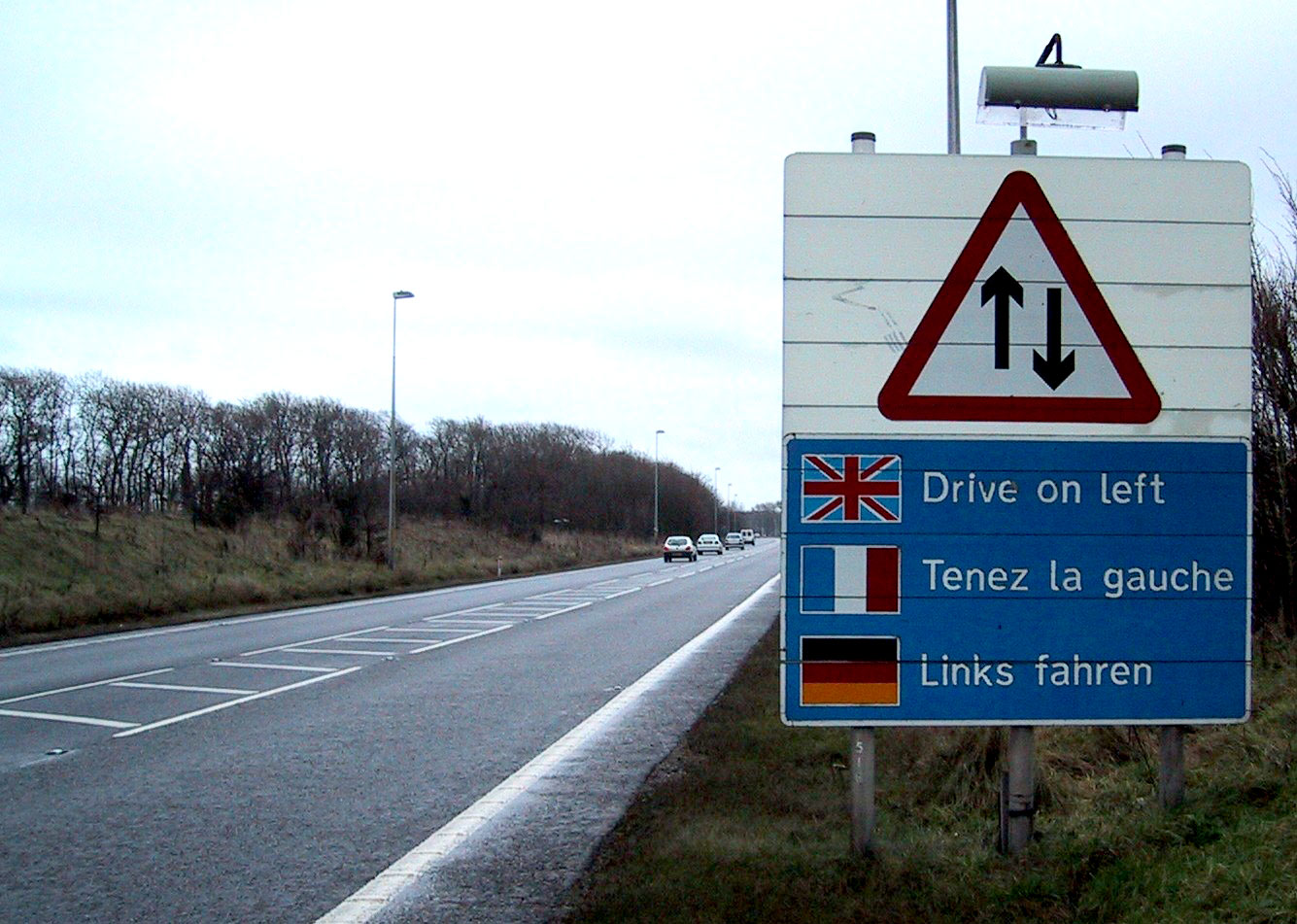
Multilingual sign in Kent

Bilingual signs are used in Wales. Welsh highway authorities, until 2016, could choose whether the signs in their area were "English-priority" or "Welsh-priority", and the language having priority in each highway authority's area appeared first on signs. Most of south Wales used English-priority while western, mid, and most of northern Wales were Welsh-priority. New regulations that came into force in 2016 mandate all signs to be in Welsh first, with the existing "English-priority" signage being replaced only when they otherwise would. Bilingual signs were permitted by special authorisation after 1965, and in 1972 the Bowen Committee recommended that they should be provided systematically throughout Wales.

A small number of multilingual signs exist in the UK on major roads that leave major ports (such as the Port of Dover). They give the UK standard speed limits and remind drivers to drive on the left, in English, French, and German. Multilingual 'no stopping' signs exist in several locations on the M25.

Another example of multilingual signs in the UK are for Escape Lanes (or Runaway truck ramps) warning not to block the escape lane in English, French, German and Spanish.

In the Scottish Highlands and Islands, many road signs have Scottish Gaelic in green or orange, in addition to English in black. This is part of the Gaelic language revival encouraged by many, including the Scottish Government and Bòrd na Gàidhlig.

In 2024, the Department for Infrastructure in Northern Ireland, announced a pilot for introducing the first bilingual road signage in Northern Ireland. In 2026, the first bilingual road signs, as well as road marking, arranged with Irish first and then English, were introduced to the Gaeltacht Quarter, Belfast, as part of a pilot experiment in the area for the signage, to be used for the wider rollout of bilingual signage across Northern Ireland.

=== Retroreflection ===
Road signs in the UK must be retroreflective in order for drivers to read them at night. There are three commonly used grades of materials used:

- Class 1 (engineering grade) is a low-performance glass bead product, it was the first reflective material used on the UK network and invented by 3M. Today in the UK it is used only for street nameplates and parking signs.
- Class 2 (high-intensity) is generally a microprismatic product which uses truncated cube corners to return light to the driver. It is commonly used for directional signs or less important regulatory signs. There are also high-intensity glass bead products that meet this class.
- Class 3 (diamond grade) is a high end microprismatic product for important signs, those on high-speed roads and in areas of ambient lighting where a driver may be distracted by the light clutter. Class 3 can be divided into two divisions; 3A for long distance and 3B for short distance. Currently, the only product that performs to these levels is Diamond Grade DG3.

== Categorisation ==
=== Warning signs ===
The importance of a warning sign is emphasised by the red border around its edge and the triangular shape. Some warning signs do not have a red border like sharp deviation. The priority of traffic through the junction is indicated by the broader line. Signs shown below exclude low bridges, railway and tramway level crossings, bus and pedal cycle facilities and road works.

STOP or GIVE WAY ahead

Plate use with "STOP" triangle to give the distance to STOP line

Plate used with "GIVE WAY" triangle to give the distance to GIVE WAY line

Crossroads

T-junction

Side road on right (Note: Left if symbols reversed)

Staggered junction, first on left (Note: Symbol may be reversed)

Traffic merges from the left (Note: Right if symbol reversed)

Traffic merges onto the main carriageway, from left

Roundabout

Plate used with warning signs where a reduction in speed is necessary

Bend to right

Junction on a bend

Junction on a bend

Crossroads on a bend

Double bend first to the left

Plate used with "roundabout" or "bend" signs

Advisory speed limit in miles per hour

Sharp deviation of route to the left (Note: Right if chevrons reversed)

Road narrows on both sides

Road narrows on the right

Single file traffic in each direction

Road wide enough for only one line of vehicles

End of dual carriageway

Two-way traffic

Two-way traffic on route crossing ahead

Steep hill downwards (10% is equivalent to 1:10)

Steep hill upwards (20% is equivalent to 1:5)

Plates used with "steep hill" signs

Plates used with "steep hill" signs

Plates used with "steep hill" signs

Hump bridge

Opening or swing bridge

Tunnel

Traffic signals ahead

Plate used with traffic signals ahead sign to indicate part-time traffic signals

Part time traffic signals ahead

Zebra crossing

Pedestrians ahead

Frail pedestrians likely to cross

Children

"School" plate used with the children sign

"School patrol" plate used with the children sign

"Playground" plate used with the children sign

Pedestrians in road for distance shown

Disabled pedestrians. (Note: "Disabled" may be varied to "Blind")

"Disabled children" plate used with the children sign

Cattle

Plate used with "cattle" to indicate supervised cattle crossing ahead

Sheep

Wild horses or ponies

Accompanied horses or ponies likely to be in or crossing the road

Horse-drawn vehicles likely to be in the road

Wild animals

Migratory toad crossing

Wildfowl

Small wild animals likely to be in the road (Note: This sign is not in TSRGD and was specially authorised for each local authority, e.g. Hull)

Cattle grid

Plate used with "cattle grid" for indication of bypass for horse-drawn vehicles and animals

Agricultural vehicles

"Farm traffic" plate

Worded warning (Note: "Ford" may be varied to "Flood", "Gate", "Gates" or "No smoking")

Try brakes after crossing a ford or before descending a steep hill

Ice or Snowdrifts

Plate used with "ice" (Note: May be varied to "snowdrifts")

Quayside or river bank

Water course alongside road

Uneven road

Soft verges

Plate used with "soft verges" for distance shown

Slippery road

Hump or series of humps

Distance for which humps extend

Direction to and distance for which humps extend

Direction and distance to hump ahead

Low-flying aircraft or sudden aircraft noise

Low-flying helicopters or sudden helicopter noise

Gliders likely

Risk of falling or fallen rocks

Other danger ahead (Note: This sign must be accompanied by an information plate specifying the nature of the danger)

Fire station ahead, STOP when lights show (Note: "FIRE" may be varied to "AMBULANCE")

Distance over which hazard extends

Distance to hazard

Distance and direction to hazard

Area infected by animal disease

Oncoming traffic will be in the middle of the road

Side winds

Slow-moving military vehicles likely to be in or crossing the road

Slow-moving vehicles ahead

Plate for "slow-moving vehicles" to show distance over which slow lorries extends

Traffic queues likely ahead

"Queues likely" plate

==== Hazard plates ====
The exclamation mark warning sign requires a plate indicating the specific hazard. This plate can read many possible texts; all of which are shown below.

Accident

Blasting

Blind summit

Dust cloud

Fallen tree

Frost damage

Hidden dip

Overhead cable repairs

Road liable to flooding

Smoke

=== Regulatory signs ===
Signs in circular red borders are prohibitive, whether or not they also have a diagonal red line. Circular blue signs mainly give a positive (mandatory) instruction. Such circular signs may be accompanied by, or placed on, a rectangular plate (information) that provides details of the prohibition or instruction; for example, waiting and loading plates and zone entry signs.

'Stop' signs (octagonal) and 'give way' signs (inverted triangle) are the two notable exceptions, the distinctive shapes being recognisable even if the face is obscured by dirt or snow.

Stop before crossing the transverse line on the road and ensure the way is clear before entering a major road

Give way to traffic on the major road (English Language Only)

Give way to traffic on the major road (English and Welsh Language)

No Entry for vehicular traffic

All vehicles prohibited except pedal cycles being pushed by hand

Information plate used in addition to previous sign

Plate for "vehicles prohibited", all vehicles prohibited from 'Play Street' during the period indicated except for access

Motor vehicles prohibited. (Note: This sign may display an exemption plate (for example: 'Except buses'))

Motor vehicles except solo motorcycles prohibited. (Note: This sign may display an exemption plate (for example: 'Except for access'))

Solo motorcycles prohibited.

Towed caravans prohibited

Pedestrians prohibited

Ridden or accompanied horses prohibited

Horse-drawn vehicles prohibited.

Articulated vehicles prohibited

Track–laying vehicles prohibited

Goods vehicles exceeding an unladen weight of 7.5 t prohibited.

End of prohibition of goods vehicles exceeding the maximum unladen weight indicated in a previous sign

Vehicles exceeding length indicated prohibited (metric).

Vehicles exceeding length indicated prohibited (imperial).

Vehicles carrying explosives (such as fireworks) prohibited. This sign is not actually in the regulations but separately approved by the DfT.

Additional plate required on "prohibited: vehicles carrying explosives" sign because the sign is not included in the TSRGD

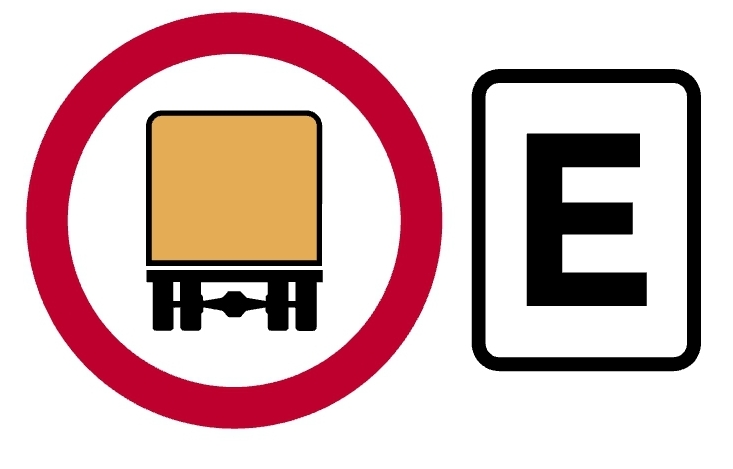
Vehicles carrying dangerous goods with the restriction code indicated by the sign are prohibited from the tunnel.

Vehicles exceeding width indicated prohibited (imperial and metric).

Vehicles exceeding height indicated prohibited (imperial and metric)

Vehicles exceeding a gross weight of 33 t prohibited from crossing the bridge or structure. (Note: The exception plate is optional, but this is the only exception permitted.)

Exception plate for allowing access to premises where there is no other route. (Note: Usage restricted to specified regulation signs, other exceptions may be shown)

Except for loading and unloading by goods vehicles

No overtaking

Priority must be given to vehicles from the opposite direction

Priority must be given to vehicles from the opposite direction (supplementary panel)

No U-turns for vehicular traffic

No right turn for vehicular traffic

No left turn for vehicular traffic

Stop, children crossing ahead (Handheld sign) (Note: Sign can only be displayed by a person at a patrolled crossing.)

Stop before crossing, Police ahead

Prohibitions which apply to a decorative area which is not part of the public highway. (Note: The word 'animals' and/or the prohibited pedestrians sign may be omitted)

Vehicular traffic must turn left

Vehicular traffic must turn ahead in the direction indicated by the arrow

Vehicular traffic passing the sign must keep to the left of the sign

Dual carriageway Plate

One-way plate

Mini-roundabout; vehicles must give way to traffic from the right and pass to the left of the central markings unless physically unable to do so

No waiting

Clearway, no stopping

One-way traffic

Controlled Parking Zone

End of controlled or voucher parking zone

=== Speed limit signs ===
The United Kingdom national speed limit for cars and motorcycles is 70 mph (110 km/h) on a motorway and dual carriageway, and 60 mph (97 km/h) on a single carriageway road. In urban areas where there is electric street lighting the speed limit is 30 mph (48 km/h), or 20 mph (32 km/h) in Wales, unless otherwise signed.

National speed limit applies

Minimum speed limit of 30 mph (48 km/h)

End of 30 mph (48 km/h) minimum speed limit

Entrance to a 20 mph (32 km/h) per hour speed limit zone

End of 20 mph (32 km/h) zone

Area in which cameras are used to enforce the speed limit regulations

Average speed check

Speed Camera

Speed camera ahead with reminder of 30 mph (48 km/h) speed limit

National speed limits

Speed limits are in miles per hour (Northern Ireland only)

Maximum speed 20 mph (32 km/h)

Maximum speed 30 mph (48 km/h)

Maximum speed 40 mph (64 km/h)

Maximum speed 50 mph (80 km/h)

Maximum speed 60 mph (97 km/h)

=== Low bridge signs ===
Bridges with a clearance of less than 16 feet 7 inches (5.05 m) are normally signed. Signs were formerly only in feet and inches, but from 2015 new or replacement signs must contain both imperial and metric measurements. The signs used at a low bridge depend on the type above the road. If a beam bridge with a horizontal clearance, the roundel is used and the limit is a prohibition. However, if the bridge is an arch over the road, warning signs are used as the height varies across the width of the carriageway. Bridges particularly at risk from strikes may have a variable message sign that is activated by high vehicles passing through an infra-red beam. When the sign is activated four amber lamps flash, the top pair alternating with the bottom pair.

Warning of maximum headroom of arch bridge/overhanging structure some distance ahead (sign also used at the bridge itself)

Supplementary plate informing height limit warning is of an overhanging building

Warning of maximum headroom of arch bridge directly ahead (metric)

Warning of maximum headroom of arch bridge directly ahead (imperial)

Supplementary plate used with arch bridge warning signs

=== Level crossing signs ===
Some level crossings in the United Kingdom do not have gates or barriers. These crossings will have several signs posted on approach and at the crossing.

Level crossing with gate or barrier ahead

Level crossing without gate or barrier ahead

Trams likely to be crossing ahead

Warning of light signals at a level crossing ahead (the sign may also be used at a lifting bridge, fire station or airfield)

Electrified overhead cable ahead

Supplementary plate informing height of overhead cables at level crossing ahead

Risk of grounding at level crossing ahead

Information sign for large vehicles informing to phone at automatic level crossing

Information sign for very large vehicles to phone before crossing railway

Telephone at level crossing

Direction to telephone at level crossing

Countdown marker to level crossing (3)

Countdown marker to level crossing (2)

Countdown marker to level crossing (1)

Supplementary plate warning drivers to not block the level crossing

Supplementary plate at multiple track automatic level crossings warning of a second train

Single track level crossings without gates or barriers

==== The Private Crossings (Signs and Barriers) Regulations 2023 ====
Additional signs for level crossings used on private roads and paths are laid down in the Private Crossings (Signs and Barriers) Regulations 2023 (SI 2003/1112).

Warning sign for a level crossing with a user operated gate ahead

Stop look and listen sign

Target for crossing gate

Sign for use at a crossing where the railway or tramway is equipped with overhead electric wires

Sign for use at a crossing where the track has an electric live rail or rails

==== The Private Crossings (Signs and Barriers) Regulations 1996 ====
Additional signs for level crossings used on private roads and paths are laid down in the Private Crossings (Signs and Barriers) Regulations 1996 (SI 1996/1786).

Warning sign for a non-vehicular crossing

Instruction sign for a vehicular crossing without a telephone

Target for crossing gate

Sign for use at a crossing where the railway or tramway is equipped with overhead electric wires

Sign for use at a crossing where the track has an electric live rail or rails

Supplementary sign for use with sign shown in Diagram 103 or 107, where the crossing is used for animal traffic

Sign for use at crossings where there are overhead electric wires, and a roadway approach has a steep slope, and a long load, such as farming machinery may strike the wire.

Instructions to horseriders at a crossing where the railway or tramway is equipped with overhead electric wires

=== Bus and cycle signs ===
Some roads and pavements are shared with cyclists and buses. The word "local" on the bus symbol means the only buses that may use the lane are those running a local service. Where the word "local" is not shown, the lane may be used by any vehicle designed to carry more than eight passengers, excluding the driver, and local buses. Solo motorcycles may use the lane where the motorcycle symbol is shown on the signs. Other vehicles may enter and stop in a bus lane to load and unload unless signs alongside the lane indicate otherwise.

Buses prohibited.

Riding of pedal cycles prohibited. (Note: Schedule 5 of the traffic signs regulations specifically state that the use of this sign is not backed by any legislation)

Cyclists crossing or cycle route ahead

Shared route for pedal cycles and pedestrians only

Segregated track and path for pedal cycles and pedestrians only

Route for use by pedal cycles only

Route for use by tramcars only

Route for use by buses and tramcars only

Contra-flow bus lane

Route recommended for pedal cycles on the main carriageway of a road

End of bus lane

Junction ahead leading to a parking place for pedal cycles

With flow cycle lane

Bus lane with traffic proceeding from both ways (reminder for pedestrians)

With-flow cycle lane ahead

Parking place for buses only during the times shown

Contra-flow bus lane which pedal cycles may also use with traffic approaching from the right (reminder for pedestrians)

=== Pedestrian zone signs ===
Areas such as high streets and shopping areas may be signed as "pedestrian zones". Restrictions are detailed on zone entry signs and repeater plates. The entry signs may indicate that buses, taxis, disabled badge holders or permit holders may enter the zone. Examples of zone entry signs include:

Entry to and waiting in pedestrian zone restricted except for loading during the period

End of restrictions associated with a pedestrian zone

Waiting restriction repeater signs within the pedestrian zone

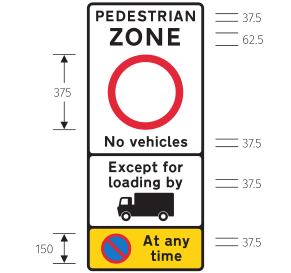
No vehicles allowed in pedestrian zone except for lorries during the period with no waiting at any time

No motor vehicles allowed in pedestrian zone Mondays to Saturdays except for loading from lorries between 7am & 11am and between 4pm and 8pm

=== Loading bays and parking signs ===
Both signs and road markings indicate waiting restrictions. On-street parking places may be designated for a particular class of vehicle (e.g. solo motorcycles or car) or a specific type of user (e.g. permit holders or disabled badge holders). Parking may be free or paid for (e.g. "pay and display" or parking meters).

There may be a time limit on the period of stay and a minimum time before returning to a particular parking place. Where a plate does not indicate the days of the week, the restrictions apply at the same times on every day, including Sunday. Where the time of day is not shown, the controls apply for 24 hours. If a bank holiday falls on a day when the controls are in operation, the controls apply in the normal way unless the plate states that they do not. Special restrictions may apply on days when a large event is being held.

Waiting prohibited except for loading and unloading during the period indicated

Waiting prohibited except for loading and unloading during the period and in the direction indicated

Waiting prohibited in designated off-highway loading area during the period indicated

Continuous prohibition on loading and unloading

Bay reserved for loading and unloading only

Waiting prohibited in the direction indicated (upper panel), and loading and unloading prohibited in the direction indicated (lower panel)

Parking place

Parking place reserved for disabled badge holders only

Parking for all vehicles, with restrictions on length of waiting time and return period (not necessarily free, though the sign must state if not free)

Parking place reserved for voucher parking during the period indicated

Direction to a parking place available only on the day specified

Vehicles may be parked partially on the verge or footway

Vehicles may be parked wholly on the verge or footway

End of an area where vehicles may be parked partially on the verge or footway

End of an area where vehicles may be parked wholly on the verge or footway

=== Motorway signs ===
For use on busy motorways and other wide roads where verge mounted signs would be frequently obstructed by other traffic.

An advance direction sign (ADS) generally has blue, green or white as its background colour to indicate the status of a road (motorway, primary or non-primary) on which it is placed. Except on the main carriageway of a motorway, coloured panels are used to indicate routes from the junction being signed that have a different status. A direction sign (DS) should always be a single colour indicating the status of the road to be joined, although there are a few rare exceptions to this rule.

The Heavy and Medium typefaces were designed to compensate for the optical illusion that makes dark lines on pale backgrounds appear narrower than pale lines on dark backgrounds. Hence destinations are written in mixed case white Transport Medium on green and blue backgrounds, and in black Transport Heavy on white backgrounds. Route numbers are coloured yellow when placed directly on a green background. Some signs logically show the closest destination on the route first (i.e., on top), while others show the most distant settlement first. On a roundabout DS, the route locations are usually listed with the closest destination at the bottom and the furthest away at the top when going straight ahead, and likewise going left and right. However, many left-right signs more logically indicate the closest destination at the top with further afield destinations listed in descending order.

Destinations and roads which cannot be directly accessed on a driver's current actual route but can be accessed via an artery route of that carriageway, are displayed in brackets.

All types of ADS (but not DS) may optionally have the junction name at the top of the sign in capital letters in a separate panel.

A route confirmatory sign is placed either after a junction where distances were not shown on the ADS or DS or is placed on an overhead information sign but does not show distances to the destinations along that route.

End of motorway regulations, including the national speed limit in 1 mile

Start of motorway regulations, including the national speed limit

Number of route reached from a motorway exit road

10 miles (16 km) to the next motorway service area

Junction ahead with another motorway

Entrance to motorway service area, or similar facility within the length of a motorway where motorway regulations cease to apply

Motorway junction ahead, displaying the route number and destination reached by taking this route

Route number of the motorway with destinations and distances to places along or reached from that route

Direction to a motorway at the junction shown, indicating route number and destination reached

Entrance to a motorway service area

Availability of motorway service areas ahead with distances

Availability of motorway service areas ahead with distances and names of operators

Approach sign to motorway service area listing operator and six franchises available at the stop.

Approach sign to motorway service area listing operator and six franchises available at the stop. These are the only signs allowed to display brand logos.

Leave the Motorway for A38 to Mansfield and Matlock (via. A615). Continue for the North, Leeds and Sheffield.

Additional traffic lane joining from the left ahead

Suggestion for motorists to pull over at the next motorway services if they have been driving for a long time.

==== Motorway signals ====
Motorway conditions

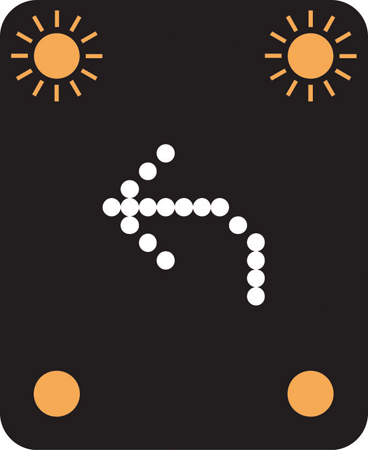
Leave motorway at next exit

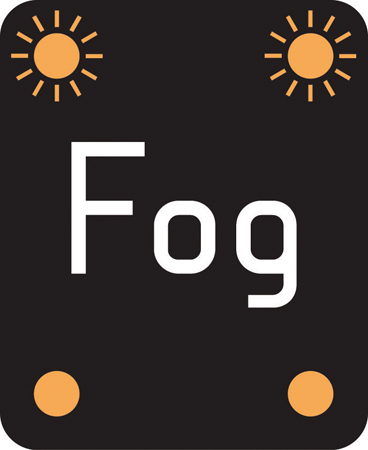
Risk of Fog ahead. Proceed with caution

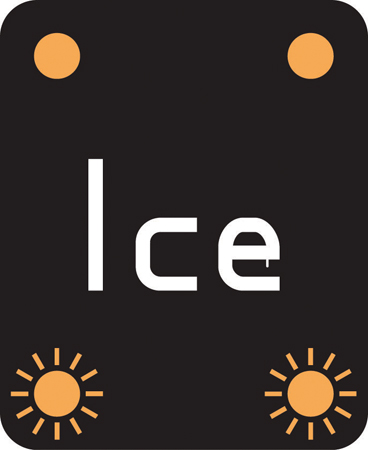
Risk of Ice ahead. Proceed with caution

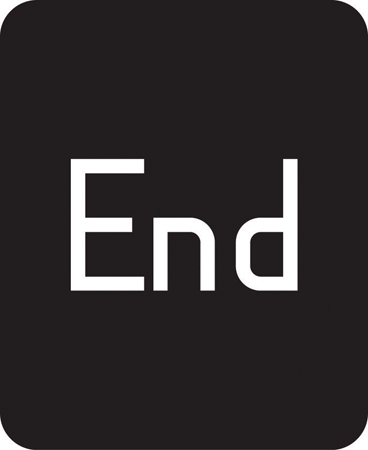
End of temporary restrictions

Temporary speed advisories

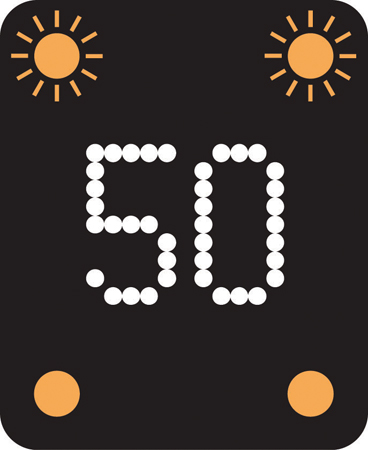
Temporary speed advised of 50 mph (80 km/h) due to prevailing traffic or weather conditions.

Lane restrictions

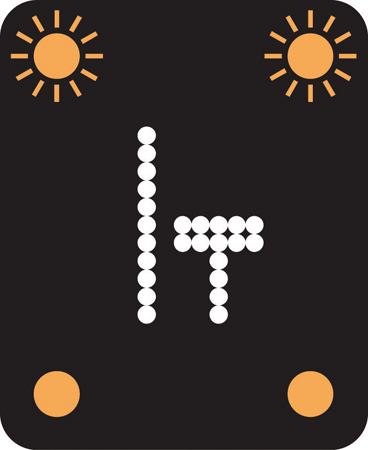
Lane 2 is closed ahead. Use lane 1 and proceed with caution.

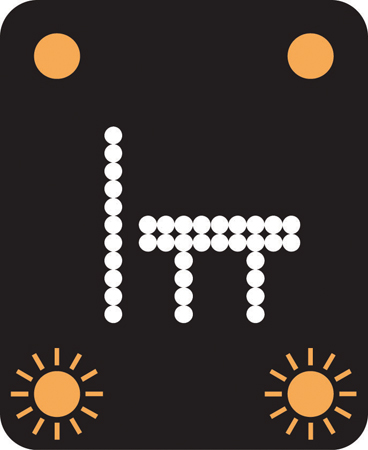
Lane 2 and 3 closed ahead. Use lane 1 and proceed with caution.

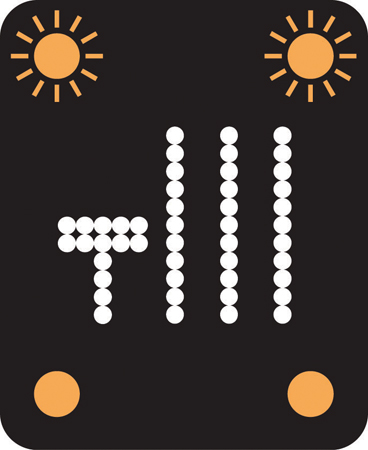
Lane 1 closed. Use lanes 2, 3 and 4, Proceed with caution

Motorway closed

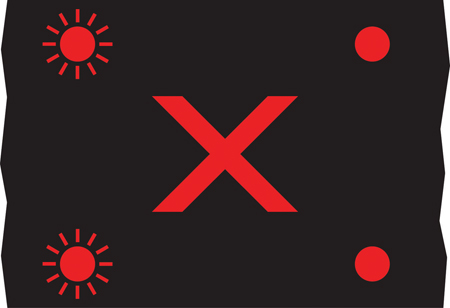
Do not enter the traffic lane directly below. (Note: A previous signal may direct you into an adjacent lane. More than one lane may be closed to traffic. If all lanes display a red cross, the motorway ahead is closed. Motorists caught using the traffic lane are subject to a fine of £100 and will receive points on their licence.)

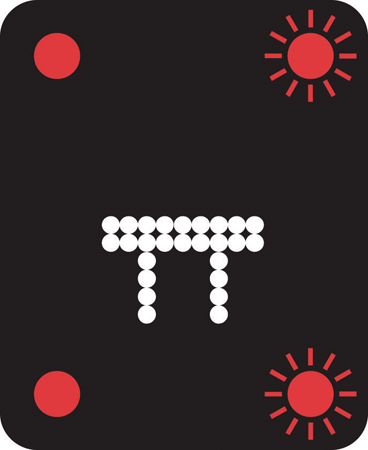
Both lanes closed. Do not enter the motorway when the red lamps are flashing in pairs from side to side

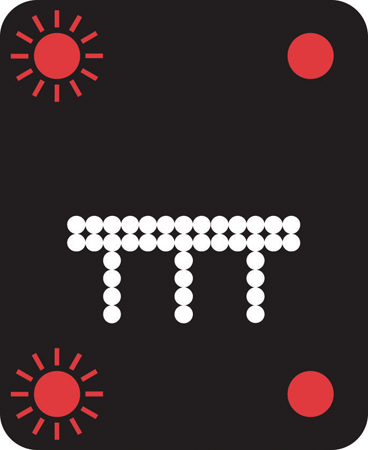
All three lanes closed. Do not enter the motorway when the red lamps are flashing in pairs from side to side

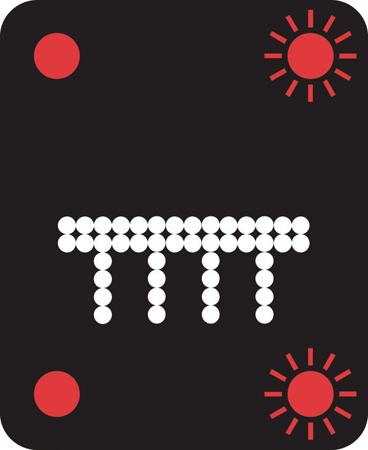
All four lanes closed. Do not enter the motorway when the red lamps are flashing in pairs from side to side

=== Directional road signs ===
The term "directional sign" covers both advance direction signs (ADS), placed on the approach to a junction, and direction signs (DS) at the junction itself, showing where to turn. A DS has a chevron (pointed) end, and this type is also referred to as a flag-type sign.

300 yd (270 m) to a roundabout or the next point at which traffic may leave a primary route

200 yd (180 m) to a roundabout or the next point at which traffic may leave a primary route

100 yd (91 m) to a roundabout or the next point at which traffic may leave a primary route

Junction ahead of a primary route with a non-primary route through a town or village that has been by-passed

Additional traffic lanes joining from the right ahead. Traffic in the right-hand lane joins the main carriageway. Traffic on the main carriageway has priority over joining traffic (primary route)

Additional traffic lane joining from the left in 200 yd (180 m). Traffic on the main carriageway had priority over joining traffic from the right-hand lane of the slip road (primary routes)

==== Tourist destinations ====
Tourist information

Camping and caravan site 300 yd (270 m) ahead

Steam railway tourist attraction 300 yd (270 m) ahead

Picnic area 150 yd (140 m) ahead

Direction to tourist attraction indicated by a symbol

Direction along a route passing through places of interest recognised by a regional tourist organisation (VisitEngland version)

Direction and distance to a picnic area

Direction and distance to a Tourist Information point or centre

Junction ahead from a motorway exit slip road to the tourist attractions shown

Direction of the route to a tourist attraction for pedestrians

Junction ahead leading to a tourist attraction

Youth hostel 200 yd (180 m) in the direction indicated

Junction ahead from a motorway exit slip road to the tourist attractions shown

Historic castle tourist attraction 10 mi (16 km) ahead

Tourist information

Stopping place for buses used for carrying tourists to allow passengers to take photographs

Motorway junction ahead leading to a town or geographical area containing several tourist attractions and a Tourist Information Point or Centre

Distance ahead to a parking place with a Tourist Information Point, picnic site, public telephone, public toilets and viewpoint

=== Diversion routes ===
Emergency diversion routes are marked with black symbols on a yellow patch (square, triangle, circle, or diamond). These mark diversionary routes in the event that the road ahead is closed for any reasons. Motorists can navigate following the symbol and can find their way back to the original road at a junction above the closure. The four symbols may be a solid shape or just outlines. They are most commonly placed on directional signs, following the route number (e.g. A 25) but may be free standing.

Motorway exits have trigger signs that are normally covered. In the event of a closure, the sign is uncovered and will say, for instance, "To rejoin M6 follow (symbol)". Following the symbol will allow rejoining at a later junction.

On minor roads a simple black on yellow sign with an arrow and the word 'Diversion' is used, as in the last sign below.

Solid circle – Emergency diversion route for motorway and other main road traffic

Solid triangle – Emergency diversion route for motorway and other main road traffic

Hollow square – Emergency diversion route for motorway and other main road traffic

Hollow diamond – Emergency diversion route for motorway and other main road traffic

Diversion trigger sign – Main road closed, follow diversion to arrive at the same location

For triangle diversion, turn right

Diversion sign on minor roads or for road works starting to left.

=== Information signs ===
Informational signs are usually rectangular and generally blue with white text.

One-way traffic

Pass either side to reach the same destination (Note: Often incorrectly used to mean pass either side regardless of destination)

Traffic has priority over vehicles coming from the opposite direction

No through road

Unsuitable for heavy goods vehicles

Unsuitable for long vehicles

No hard shoulder for 400 yd (370 m)

Location of weight restriction ahead with indication of an alternative route (Note: may show a different restriction or that the restriction is gross weight rather than unladen weight)

Passing place on a narrow road (This sign may be either a diamond or a square)

=== Roadworks and temporary signs ===
Roadworks are normally signalled with a triangular, red-bordered warning format is used to indicate that there are works ahead. The graphic is of a man digging. Within the roadworks, diversions and other instructions to drivers are normally given on yellow signs with black script.

Road works

Loose chippings

Lanes bend ahead

Restrictions apply. No vehicles over width shown

Diversion for motorists travelling to destination

Temporary Advisory speed limit in miles per hour

Get in Lane. HGV use left lane, all other vehicles use right lane

Police accident

=== Street name signs ===
Legally street name signs are not defined as traffic signs in the United Kingdom; this therefore gives authorities flexibility on the design and placement of them. They can be fixed to a signpost, wall, lamp column or building. The text can be in many different fonts but normally either the Transport typeface used on road signs or the serif font designed by David Kindersley. In many areas, the sign will also show the name of the local authority, its coat of arms, or part of the street's postcode.

=== Location identifiers ===
Numbered location markers of one type or another are used to identify specific locations along a road. Historically, milestones were used, but since the early 20th century they fell into disuse. However, for administrative and maintenance purposes, distance marker posts and driver location signs have been erected on motorways and certain dual carriageways. The numbers on distance marker posts are embedded into emergency roadside telephone numbers and are used by the emergency services to pinpoint incidents. The advent of the mobile phone meant that drivers were not accessing location information embedded into motorway emergency telephone systems, and since 2007 driver location signs have been erected on many motorways. These contain important information about the location and carriageway direction.

=== Traffic lights ===
Standard traffic light, with three lamps

A standard traffic light with a supplemental 'no left turn' sign attached

A traffic light with attached tram signal lamp, indicating proceed to trams.

A traffic light intended for bicycles

'Wig-wag' signal (Common at level crossings, fire and ambulance stations)

Pedestrian light

=== Icons ===
Animal-drawn vehicles

Animal-drawn vehicles

Elderly people

Frogs

Horses

Small wild animals

Caravans

Cattle

Horses

Wild animals

Children

Roadworks

Quayside or riverbank

Cars

Ducks

Sheep

Pedestrians

Pedestrians

Motor vehicles, except motorcycles

Motor vehicles, except motorcycles

Ferry

=== Obsolete ===
==== Post-Worboys ====
Crossroads ahead (1965–1975)

T-junction ahead (1965–1975)

Side road ahead (1965–1975)

Staggered crossroads ahead (1965–1975)

Traffic merges from the left (1965–1994)

Traffic merges onto the main carriageway (1965–1994)

Series of bends ahead (1965–1975).

Steep hill upwards ahead (1965–1975, replaced with % gradient)

Steep hill downwards ahead (1965–1975, replaced with % gradient)

Multiple-track level crossing without gate or barrier (1981–1994)

Zebra crossing (1965–1994)

Children (1965–1994)

Children (1994–2016)

Stop (1965–1975)

Stop – children crossing (1965–1994)

Lorries prohibited (1965–1975)

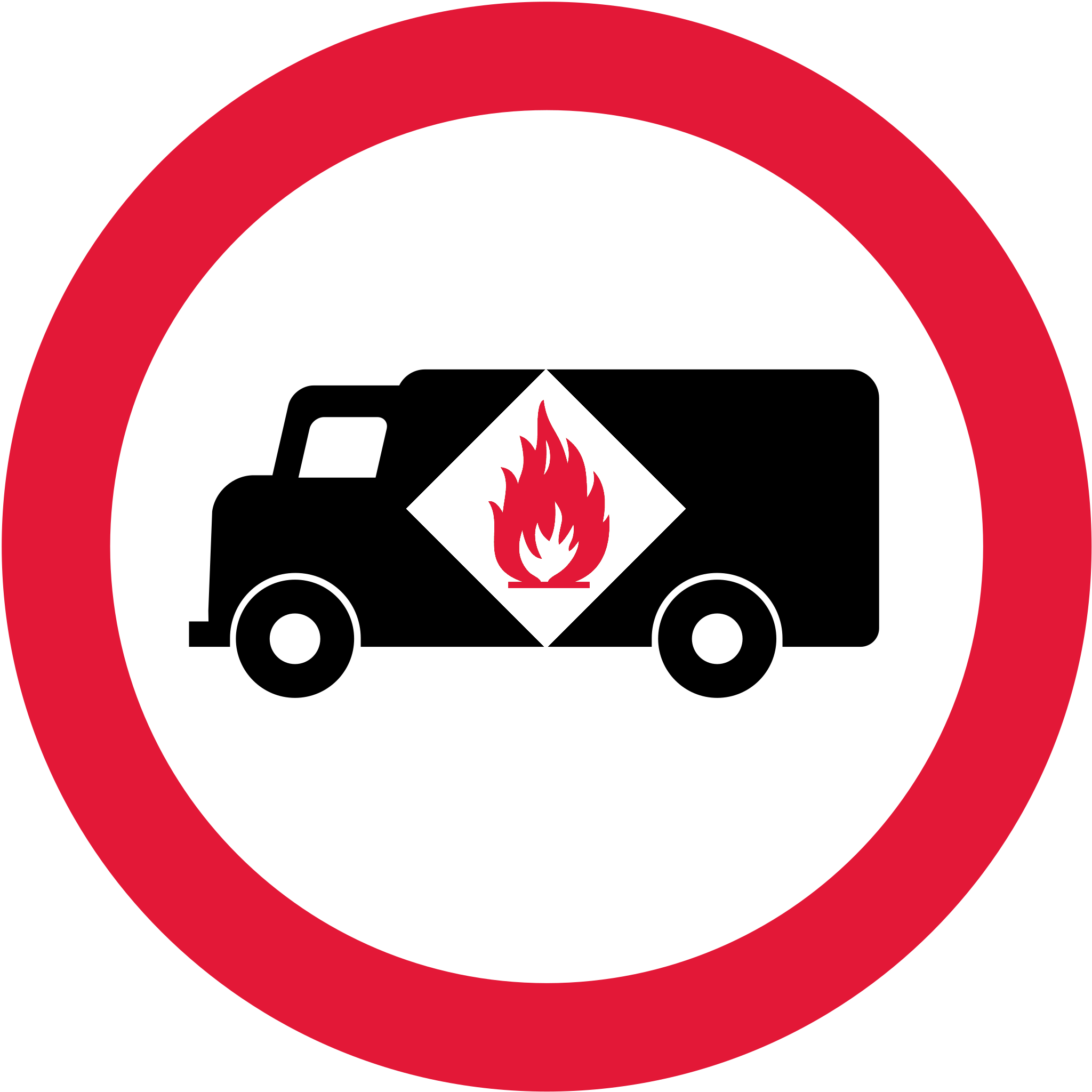
No vehicles laden with inflammable liquids (1967)

Vehicles exceeding width indicated prohibited (1965–2016, defunct imperial only sign, new signs must show both metric and imperial)

Buses and coaches prohibited (1965–1975)

Foggy conditions may exist (1975–1994)

Icy conditions may exist (1975–1994)

Snowdrifts may exist (1975–1994)

Right-hand lane of a 2 lane dual carriageway closed ahead (1975–1981)

Change of carriageway ahead (1975–1994)

Vehicles exceeding height indicated prohibited (1975–2016, defunct imperial only sign, new signs must show both metric and imperial)

Vehicles and loads exceeding weight in tons indicated prohibited (1965–1981)

Vehicles and loads exceeding weight in tonnes indicated prohibited (1981–1994)

Vehicles exceeding the indicated unladen weight in tonnes prohibited (1994–2011, replaced with lower-case t)

Vehicles exceeding an indicated gross weight prohibited from crossing bridge (1994–2011, replaced with lower-case t)

==== Pre-Worboys ====
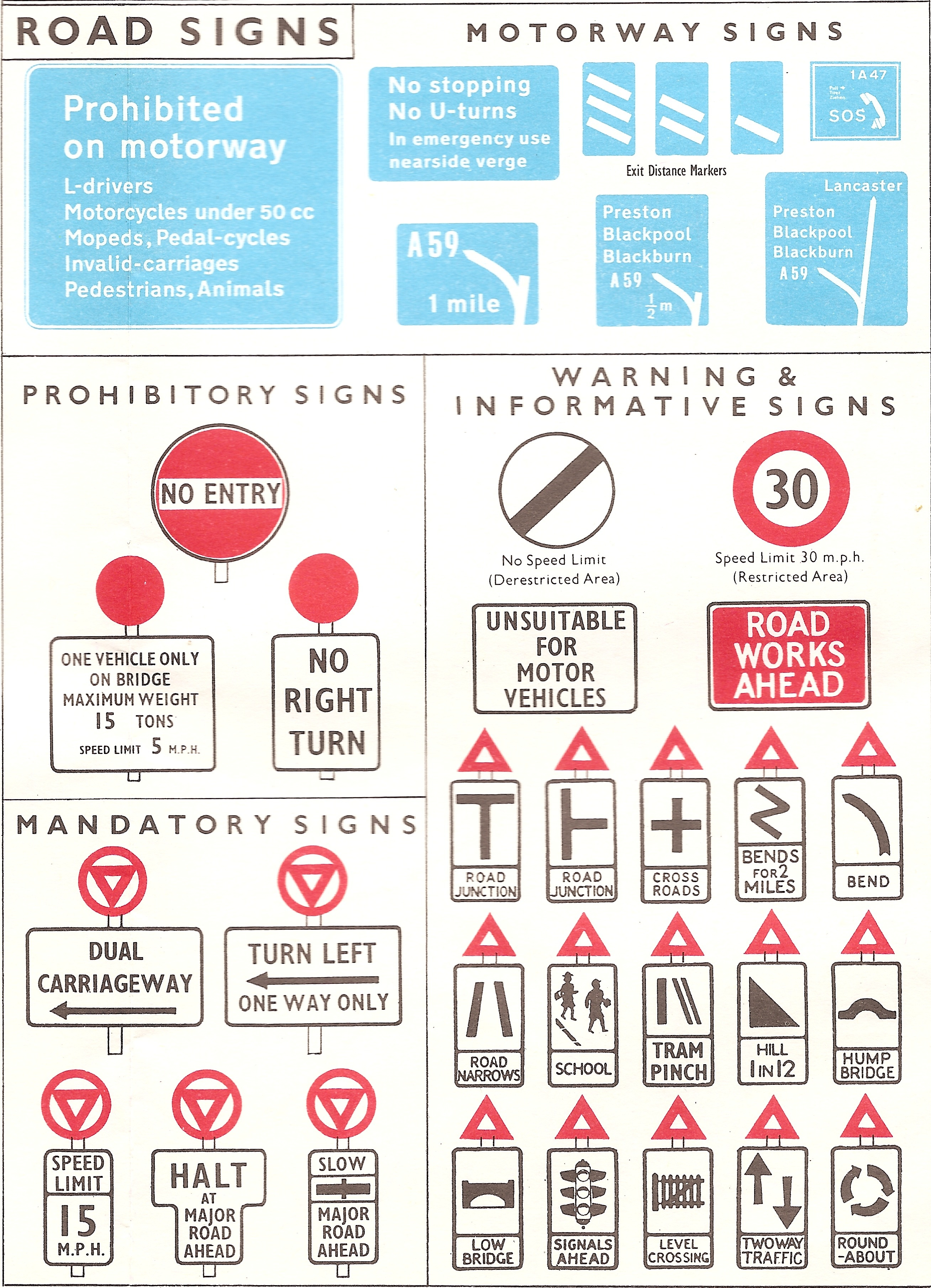

No Entry

No Right Turn

Cross Roads

Turn Left

Keep Left

Road Works Ahead

Ford

Approach Direction Sign

Junction Direction Sign

No Waiting

No Entry

No Cycling

Speed Limit

National Speed Limit Applies

Parking

Cross Roads

Speed Limit except Built-up Areas

Turn Right

Roundabout

No Left Turn

Signals Ahead

Two Way Traffic

Level Crossing with No Gates

Halt at major road ahead

Slow, major road ahead

Motor vehicles prohibited

== Northern Ireland ==
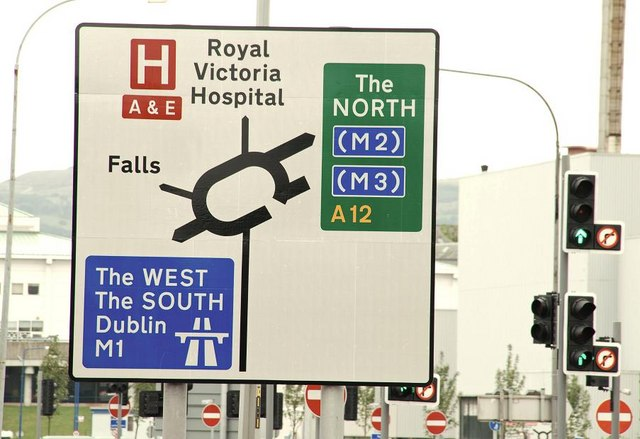
Roundabout direction sign in Northern Ireland. Destinations in the Republic are styled the same as domestic destinations without alluding to an international border.

The designs of road signs in Great Britain as prescribed in the Traffic Signs Regulations and General Directions (TSRGD) apply specifically to England, Scotland and Wales. These regulations do not extend to Northern Ireland. Traffic signs in Northern Ireland are prescribed by The Traffic Signs Regulations (Northern Ireland) 1997 and are administered by the Northern Ireland Assembly.

Northern Ireland signs are broadly the same those in Great Britain, although changes made in Great Britain are often not made in Northern Ireland at the same time. One example is the series of bends ahead sign, which was removed from TSRGD in 1975 but only removed from the Northern Ireland regulations in 1979.

Country	Drives on...	Speed units	Warning sign style
Northern Ireland	left	mph	

In 2026, bilingual road signs in Irish and then English, were first introduced in the Gaeltacht Quarter, Belfast as part of a pilot, for the wider rollout of bilingual signage across Northern Ireland.

== Crown Dependencies ==
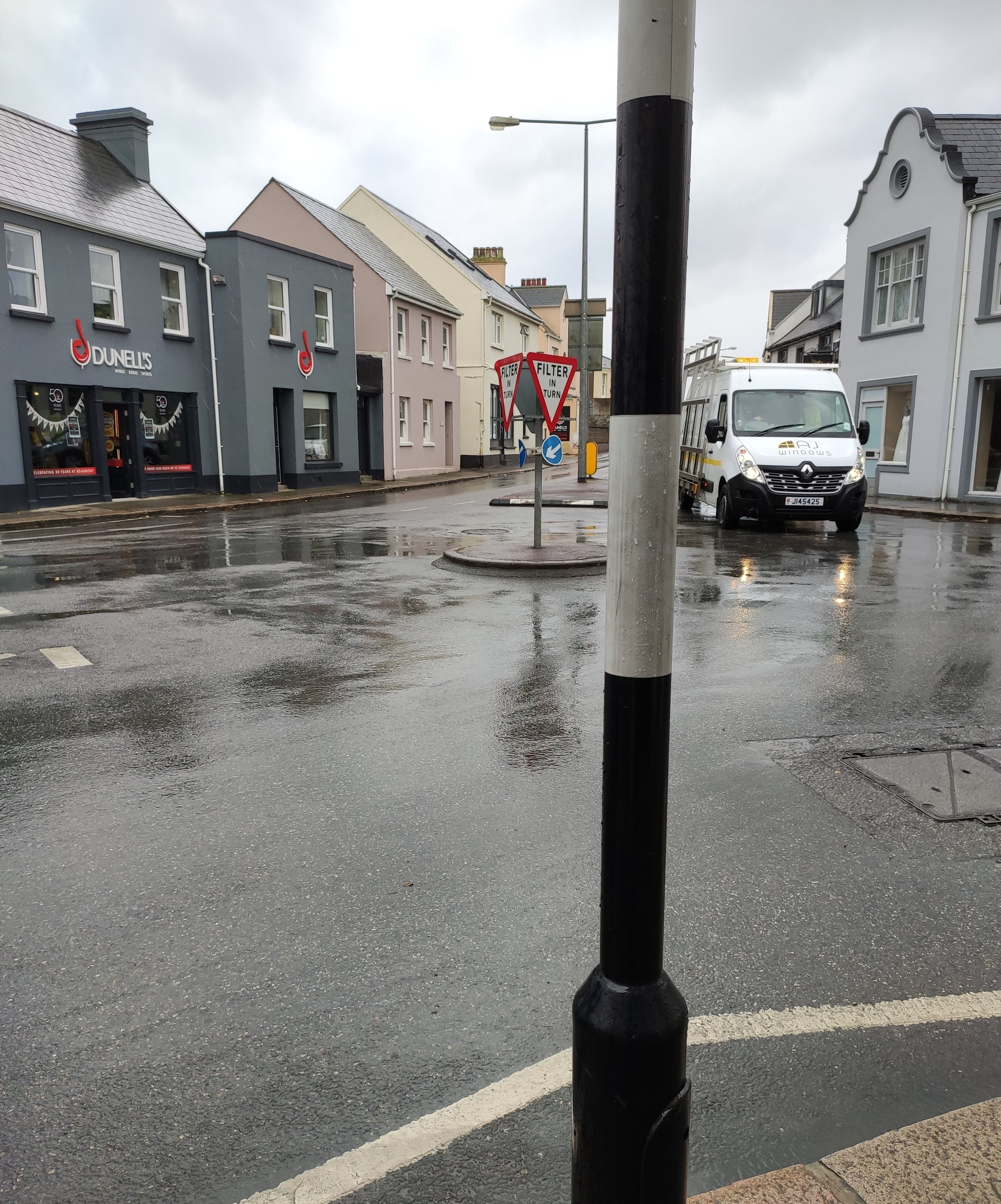
Filter in turn road signs in Jersey.

The designs of road signs as prescribed in the Traffic Signs Regulations and General Directions (TSRGD) do not extend to other territories that come under the jurisdiction of the Crown. Road signs in the Channel Islands and the Isle of Man are under the jurisdiction of their local legislatures. Although the policy in these territories is to align their road signs with those prescribed in the TSRGD, small variations may be seen.

=== Isle of Man ===
The Tynwald (Isle of Man Parliament), through its Traffic Signs (Application) Regulations 2003, explicitly included Part I of the TSRGD into Manx law, but not the other parts of that legislation. One of the consequences of this partial incorporation is that while in England and Wales speed limit signs had to appear on both sides of a carriageway until 2016, this was not necessary for the Isle of Man. Likewise, an all-way stop is permissible in the Isle of Man, whilst it has been prohibited in Great Britain since 2002.

The use of the derestricted sign differs according to jurisdiction: in the Isle of Man it means no speed limit applies, whereas in Jersey it denotes a 40 mph (64 km/h) speed limit, which is the highest permitted speed on the island.

=== Channel Islands ===
Guernsey and Jersey have a unique sign "filter in turn", which is a give way without priority. It is similar to the all-way stops found elsewhere in the world, although there is no requirement to halt.

Filter in turn sign (used in Jersey and Guernsey)

==== Jersey ====
In Jersey, road signs and markings are regulated by the Traffic Signs (Jersey) Order 1968.

The standard bus stop road marking (Diagram 1025) is painted white on Jersey roads, and a unique smaller bus stop marking is found at most stops, which lacks the stop cage.

By article 18, the Minister for Infrastructure may cause a yellow line to be placed transverse across a minor road. This indicates a 'give way' rule, as normally indicated by double white dashed lines elsewhere. The standard give way triangle (Diagram 1023) is painted yellow, even at approaches to white give way lines at roundabouts.

Parking signage is considerably different. Unloading bays (Diagram 1018J) allow loading and unloading of goods and are painted yellow with yellow upright signs. Otherwise parking signs indicate 'paycard' or 'Disc' limit restrictions. A single yellow line (Diagram 1017) indicates a 24-hour waiting restriction.

At the end of all one-way roads, the marking 'NO ENTRY' is placed to ban entry for vehicles.

The Z-bend sign (Diagram 514) is prescribed and still used. The end of a cycle track can be indicated by a blue cycle track sign with a red stripe.

In Jersey, traffic signals follow the French pattern, omitting the red-amber phase.

In Jersey, there are less onerous requirements for the signage of speed limits than the UK. Repeater signs are never used for 40 mph (64 km/h), and are sometimes used for 30 mph (48 km/h) where there are street lights (which would not be necessary in the UK). Furthermore, there is no requirement that speed limit signs appear on both sides of the carriageway (consequently they often only appear on one).

==== Guernsey ====
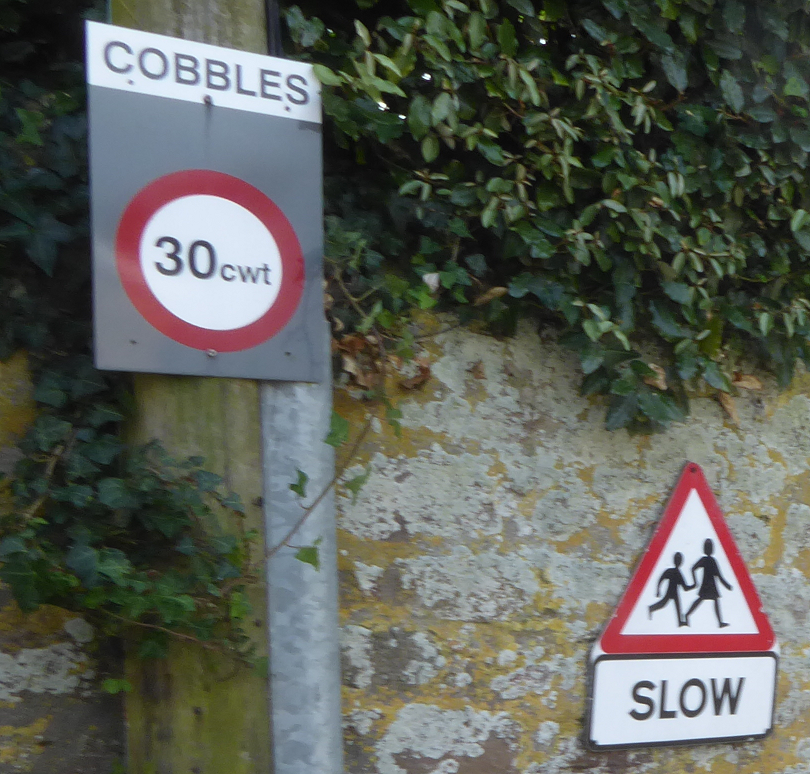
A weight restriction sign on Alderney using hundredweight

Pedestrian crossing indication sign used in Guernsey

Weight restriction signs in Guernsey use hundredweight ("cwt") as a unit rather than the tonne, although one cwt was redefined as exactly 50.8023 kg in 1991. Roads are generally narrow, with an all-island speed limit of 35 miles per hour (56 km/h); however, lower speed limits apply on certain roads. There are seasonal speed limit changes that see the speed limit of 35 miles per hour reduced to 25 miles per hour (40 km/h) on some coast roads during the summer months.

Most road markings are the same as those in the UK, with the exception of:

A yellow line across the exit of a minor road means stop and give way to traffic on the major road. A yellow arrow painted on the road warns of a yellow stop line ahead.

Junctions marked filter-in-turn. At these junctions, all directions have equal priority.

Yellow kerb-side no-stopping lines are single lines and mean you must not stop for any reason other than to avoid an accident.

Guernsey devolves road markings and signs to Alderney and Sark. Sark does not permit road transport, aside from cycles and farm vehicles. Alderney has some different road markings, but the signs are broadly the same as Guernsey.

Territory	Drives on...	Speed units	Warning sign style
Isle of Man	left	mph	
Jersey	left	mph	
Guernsey	left	mph	
Alderney	left	mph	

== Overseas territories ==
The Overseas territories have much more autonomy regarding their use of signs and these can vary quite significantly from those used in Great Britain.

=== Akrotiri and Dhekelia ===
Road signs in Akrotiri and Dhekelia, on Cyprus, are controlled by the Ministry of Defence and maintain the same designs as the Republic of Cyprus. Speeds are in kilometres per hour, distances are in kilometres. Some signs are in Turkish as well as English and Greek.

=== Anguilla ===
Anguilla mostly uses the same road signs as the United Kingdom with minor differences. Anguilla's roads occasionally cross large dish drains requiring a vehicle to slow down to cross. Because of this, the territory has its own unique dip sign.

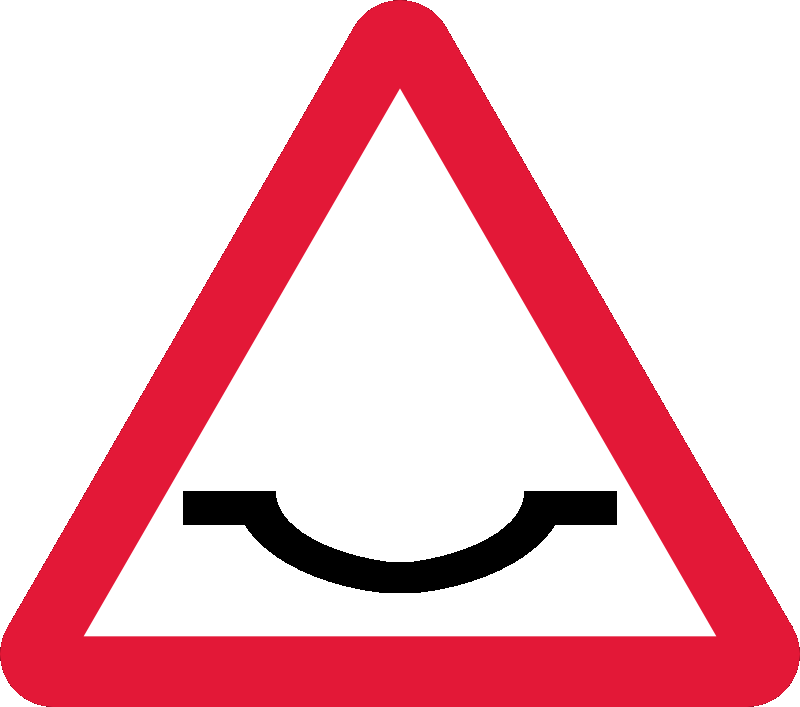
Dip sign

=== Ascension Island ===
Ascension Island mainly uses signs similar to the UK's, but the yellow diagonal signs common to the United States are also found on the island.

US-influenced signs are seen in Ascension Island.

=== Bermuda ===
Bermuda mostly uses the same style as the United Kingdom, with some exceptions. Speed limit signs are in kilometres per hour and occasionally miles per hour, and all limit signs have this marked. Longer distances are typically in kilometres, however shorter distances are signed in yards. Height and width sign restrictions are in both imperial units and metric. No entry signs have "NO ENTRY" written in black down the centre as was often used in the UK prior to 1965. Goods vehicles are prohibited by class rather than weight: a list of prohibited vehicle classes will usually accompany a generic "no lorries" sign. Bermuda still uses the Z-bend sign, phased out in the UK since 1975.

Road signs used in Bermuda
20 km/h speed limit sign

No entry sign

Goods vehicles prohibited sign

Series of bends ahead (Z-bend) sign

=== British Indian Ocean Territory ===
The British Indian Ocean Territory's road signs are modelled on those of the United States' Manual on Uniform Traffic Control Devices.

=== Cayman Islands ===
The road signs of the Cayman Islands are similar to the UK's; the only main difference is some signs have allowable alternatives from the United States' Manual on Uniform Traffic Control Devices, mainly for parking restriction signs. The warning sign for dead ends is one of the only signs to follow the United States standard in the Road Code, although other US-influenced signs are listed for use near schools.

In practice, the Transport typeface is not used and signs are written in all caps. Pedestrian crossings are often marked with a US-style sign instead of a Belisha beacon.

Dead end signs on the Cayman Islands
Warning sign

Information sign for vehicles

=== Falkland Islands ===
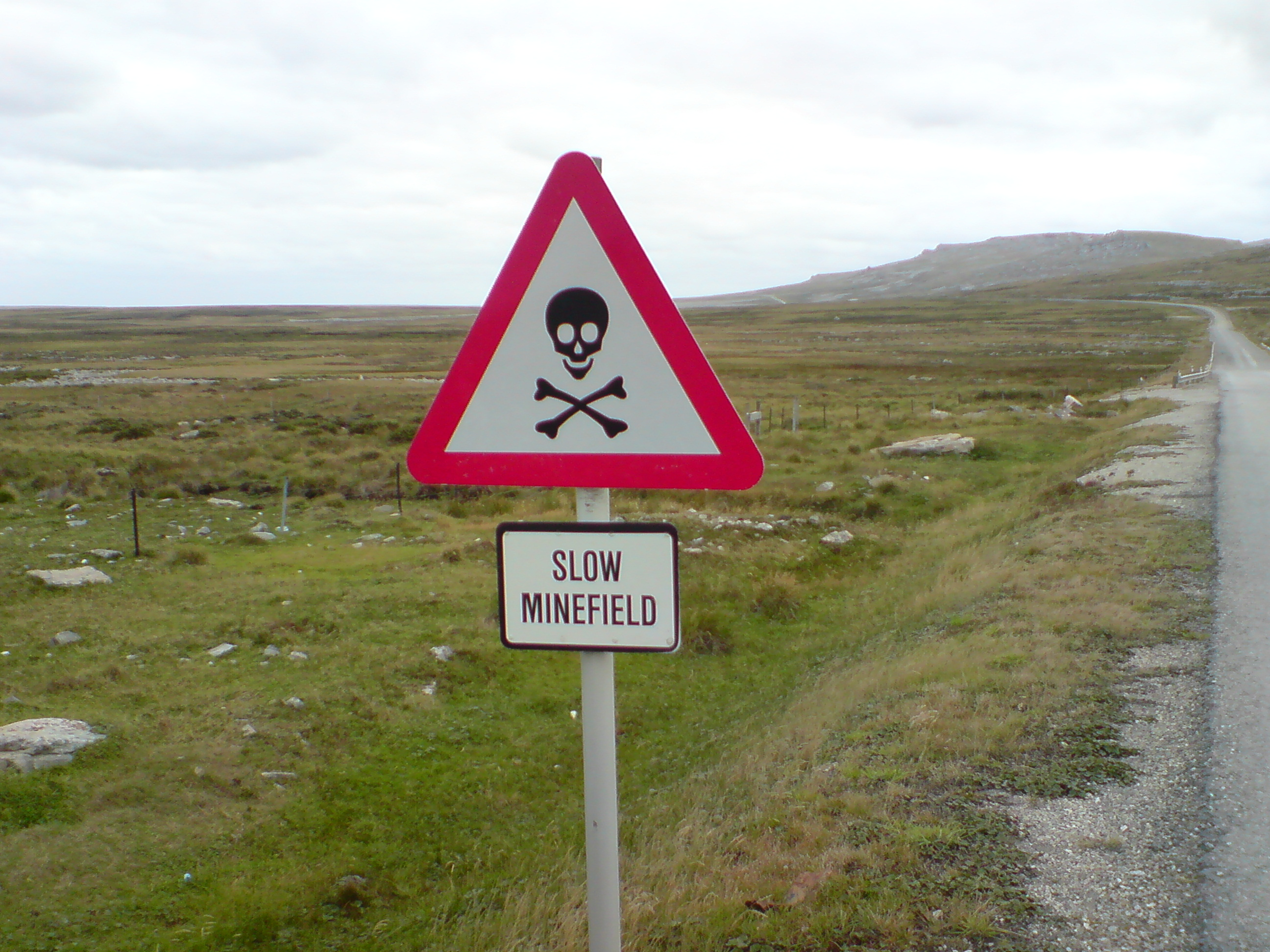
A warning sign in the Falkland Islands

The Falkland Islands' road signs are similar to the UK. There is an additional road sign used in the Falklands to denote a minefield. One distinction is that the standard urban speed limit in Stanley is 25, rather than 30, which would not be allowed on public roads in the UK as it is not a multiple of ten.

=== Gibraltar ===
The road signs of Gibraltar are similar to the UK, with some signs being reversed to reflect driving on the opposite side of the road. There are some warning signs specific to Gibraltar, mainly to do with the unique wildlife of the territory. Speed limits and distances are in metric, in keeping with the rest of the Iberian Peninsula. However, height and width clearance warning and regulatory signs are both in imperial and metric.

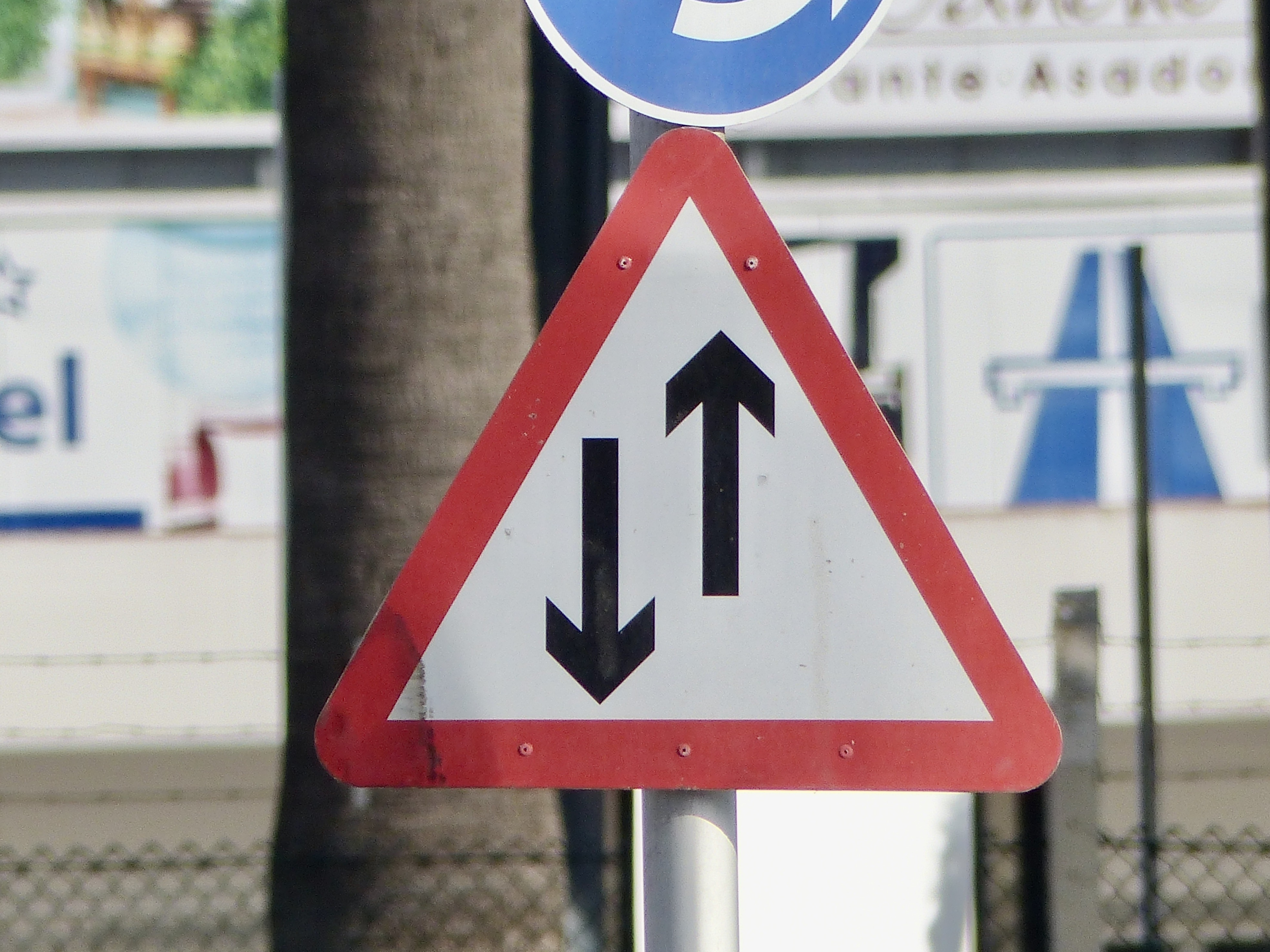
Two-way traffic warning sign in Gibraltar, flipped from the British standard to reflect Gibraltar driving on the right

Selected reversed UK road signs used in Gibraltar

=== Montserrat ===
The road signs of Montserrat are similar to those of the UK. No entry signs have "No Entry" written in red capital letters down the centre, similar to the design used in the Bahamas.

No Entry sign on Montserrat

=== Pitcairn Island ===
Road transport in Pitcairn is primarily by quad bike. Signs are modelled on those used in New Zealand, although they are not kept in step with New Zealand updates. Pitcairn uses a unique slow down sign seen in neither the UK nor New Zealand – a red octagon with "Slow Down" in white capital letters.

Road signs in Pitcairn
New Zealand's watch for children sign is sometimes used in Pitcairn.

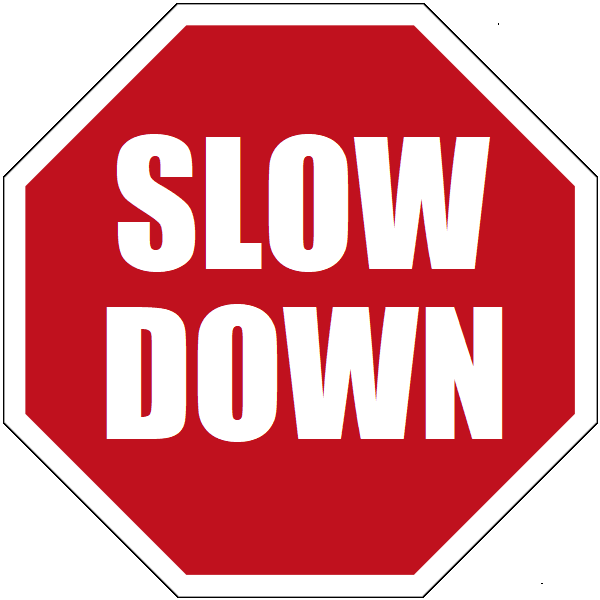
The slow down sign, unique to Pitcairn.

=== Saint Helena ===
The road signs on Saint Helena are similar to the UK's.

=== South Georgia and the South Sandwich Islands ===
South Georgia and the South Sandwich Islands inherited the traffic regulations of the Falkland Islands when it was made a separate territory in 1985. There are very few roads on the island and they are all gravel and unmarked.

=== Turks and Caicos Islands ===
The lack of road signs and official street names in the Turks and Caicos Islands was blamed for emergency vehicles not reaching their destination promptly, the government has since embarked on a programme of labelling roads and installing signs. Roads are labelled in a similar way to the United States and Canada. Road signs are similar to those of the UK, although older MUTCD-influenced signs, including US-style speed limit signs, have not been actively replaced and are still seen.

Brown signs are sometimes erroneously used instead of green to denote primary routes. Officially, green is used for primary routes and white for local routes, as in the UK. There are no traffic lights in the Turks and Caicos Islands, most intersections are roundabouts.

=== Virgin Islands ===
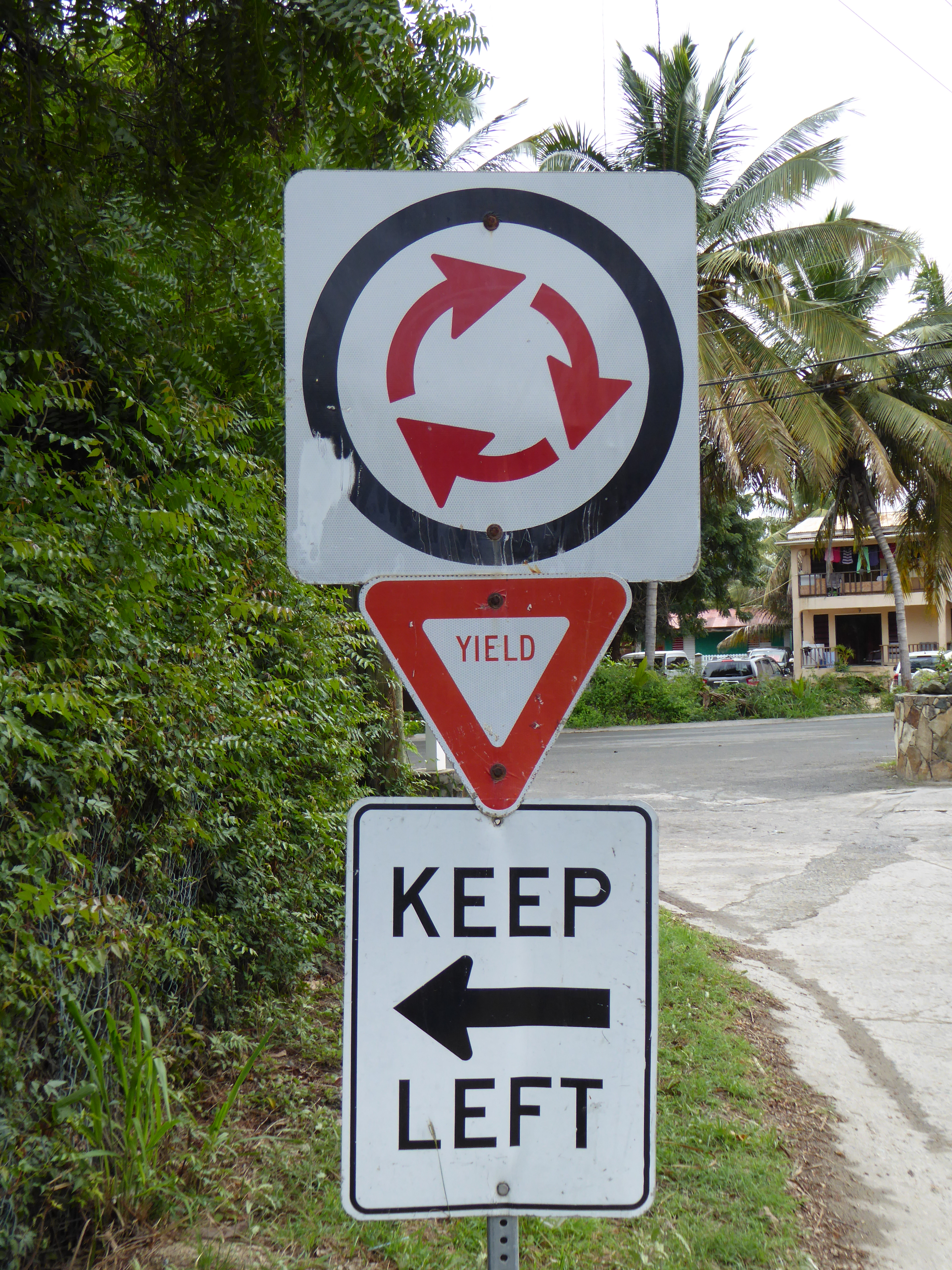
Road signs in the Virgin Islands

The road signs of the Virgin Islands are similar in design to those used in the United States. The BVI drivers manual lists British-influenced signage with occasional differences, but in reality, all signs installed follow the United States' Manual on Uniform Traffic Control Devices developed by the FHWA.

In 2018, new legislation was introduced in the Virgin Islands requiring that speed limits be labelled in both mph and km/h.

Traffic light signs on the Virgin Islands
Road sign that appears in the BVI drivers manual (most likely due to incorrect document conversion from black & white into colour)

Road sign that is most commonly installed in the Virgin Islands

=== Warning sign style ===
Territory	Drives on...	Speed units	Warning sign style
Akrotiri and Dhekelia	left	km/h	
Anguilla	left	mph	
Ascension Island	left	mph	
Bermuda	left	mostly km/h	
British Indian Ocean Territory	right	mph	
Cayman Islands	left	mph	
Falkland Islands	left	mph	
Gibraltar	right	km/h	
Montserrat	left	mph	
Pitcairn Island	left	km/h	
Saint Helena	left	mph	
South Georgia	left	mph	
Tristan da Cunha	left	mph	
Turks and Caicos Islands	left	mph	
Virgin Islands	left	mph and km/h	

== See also ==
- Highway Code
- Road signs in Ireland
