= Road signs in Saudi Arabia =

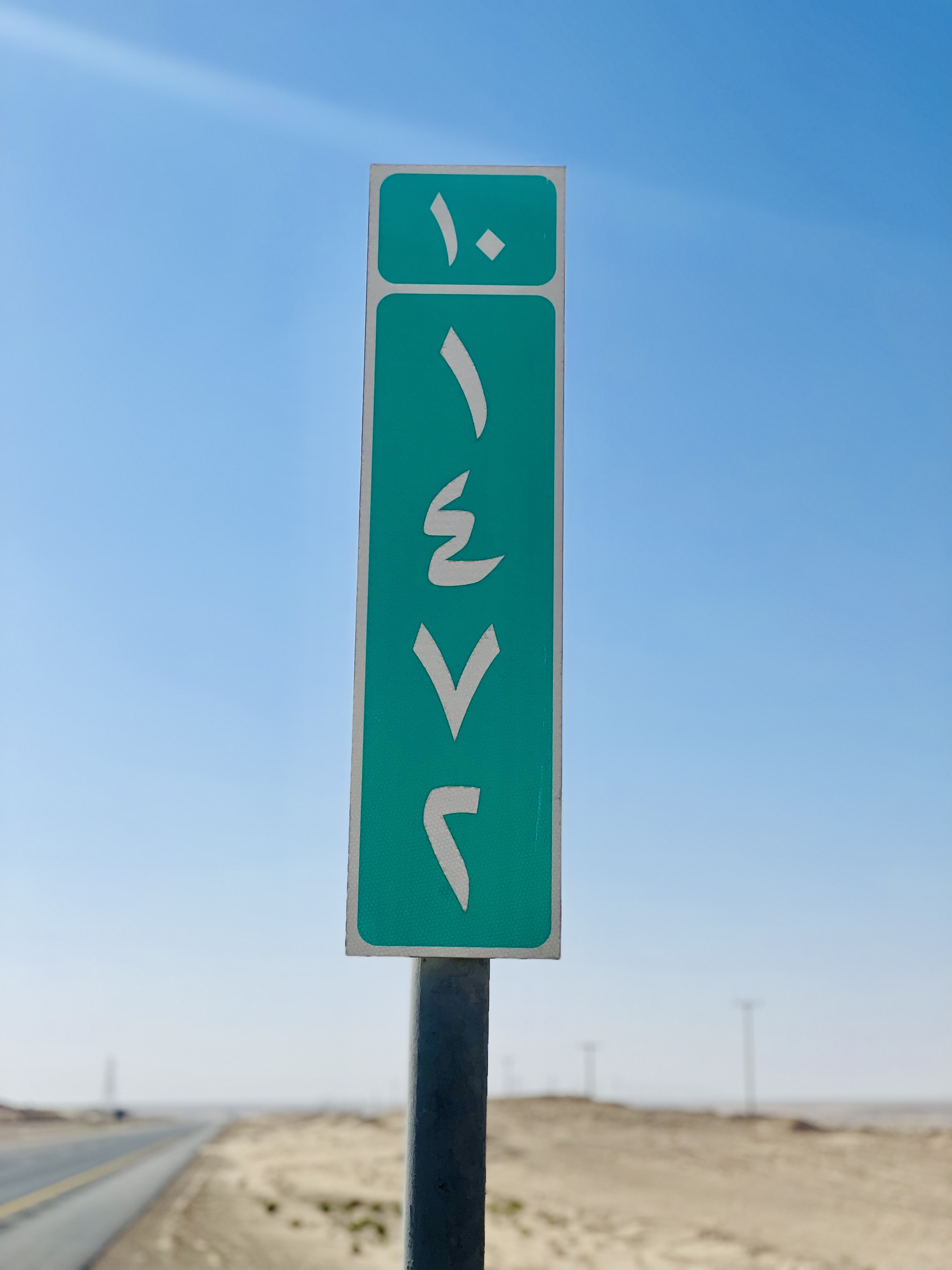
A kilometre marker on Highway 10

Road signs in Saudi Arabia are regulated in the 2007 Traffic Law. Road signs in Saudi Arabia follow the Vienna Convention on Road Signs and Signals, to which it acceded on March 31, 2022, and display text in both Arabic and English. Distances are displayed in metric units and in Eastern Arabic numerals.

In 2023, the Saudi Highway Code 602 - Manual on Uniform Traffic Control Devices was published as part of the Saudi Vision 2030 government program. This manual introduced several new signs and modified various existing signs, most notably by mandating that new signs shall only display Western Arabic numerals.

According to SHC 602, Arabic text should be rendered in Naskh script (with the Boutros Advertisers Naskh font being typically used), while the Transport typeface should be used for English text. Prior to this manual, both Highway Gothic and Helvetica were used for English text. In Medina, the Al Madinah font, developed as part of efforts to establish a unique visual identity for the city, has been used for Arabic text on directional road signs since 2020.

== Warning signs ==
Curve to left

Curve to right

Sharp curve to left

Sharp curve to right

Curves — first to the right

Curves — first to the left

Reverse curve to left

Reverse curve to right

Steep descent

Steep ascent

Road narrows — two-sided

Road narrows on the left

Road narrows - on the right

Unprotected quayside or riverbank

Uneven road

Speed bump

Dip

Slippery surface

Loose chippings

Falling rocks

Pedestrian crossing ahead

School crossing

Cyclists

Camel crossing

Animal Crossing

Traffic lights ahead (vertical)

Traffic lights ahead (horizontal)

Low-flying aircraft

Crosswinds

Two-way traffic

Crossroads

Side road to the left

Side road to the right

Stop sign ahead

Yield sign ahead

Roundabout ahead

Soft verges

One-lane bridge

Narrow bridge

Tunnel

Series of speed bumps

Start of dual carriageway

End of dual carriageway

Merging with traffic on right

Traffic merges from right

Height restriction ahead

Fire station

Other dangers

Sand dunes

Water crossing

Electrified overhead cable ahead

== Regulatory signs ==
Stop

Yield

Maximum speed limit

Trucks keep right

Truck limit

Minimum speed limit

End of minimum speed limit

No entry

No motorcycles

No bicycles

No motor vehicles, expect motorcycles

Maximum weight for trucks

No trailers

No pedestrians

No animal-drawn vehicles

No handcarts

No tractors

Maximum width

Maximum height

No motor vehicles

No motor and animal-drawn vehicles

Maximum weight

Maximum axle weight

Maximum length

No left turn

No right turn

No U-turn

No overtaking

No overtaking by trucks

No horns

No buses

Customs post

Yield to oncoming traffic

End of all restrictions

End of maximum speed limit

End of overtaking prohibition

End of overtaking by trucks prohibition

No parking

No stopping

Keep left

Keep right

Pass on either side

Turn left

Turn right

Go straight

U-turn

U-turn or straight ahead

Turn left or right

Turn left ahead

Turn right ahead

Go straight or turn left

Go straight or turn right

Roundabout

Cyclists only

Pedestrian only

Equestrian path

== Guide signs ==
Highway sign

City road sign

Mecca guidance sign

Branch Road sign

North sign

East sign

South sign

West sign

Dead end

Turn on lights

Hospital

First aid

Hotel

Restaurant

Cafe

Gas station

Breakdown service

Telephone

Park

Camping

Parking

Direction to parking

Pedestrian crossing

Motorway

End of motorway

Downtown

Street Name

Museums and Entertainment Centers and Farms

Directional sign

Directional sign

== Temporary signs ==
Steep descent

Road narrows on the right

Traffic signals ahead

Two-way traffic

Crossroads

Stop sign ahead

Start of dual carriageway

Workers in road ahead

Flagman ahead

Lane closed

Curve to right

Sharp curve to right

Detour

Suggested speed

Obstacles ahead (yellow)

Obstacles ahead (red)

== SHC 602 signs ==
=== Modified signs ===
Steep descent

Steep ascent

Stop

Maximum width

Maximum height

Maximum weight

Maximum speed limit

End of maximum speed limit

Minimum speed limit

End of minimum speed limit

Steep descent

=== New signs ===
Opening bridge

Traffic queues likely

No trucks

No mopeds

One way

One way

Pedestrian and cyclists only

Cyclist and pedestrian only

Priority road

End of priority road

Yield sign ahead
