= Highway location marker =

Numbered marker along a road or boundary

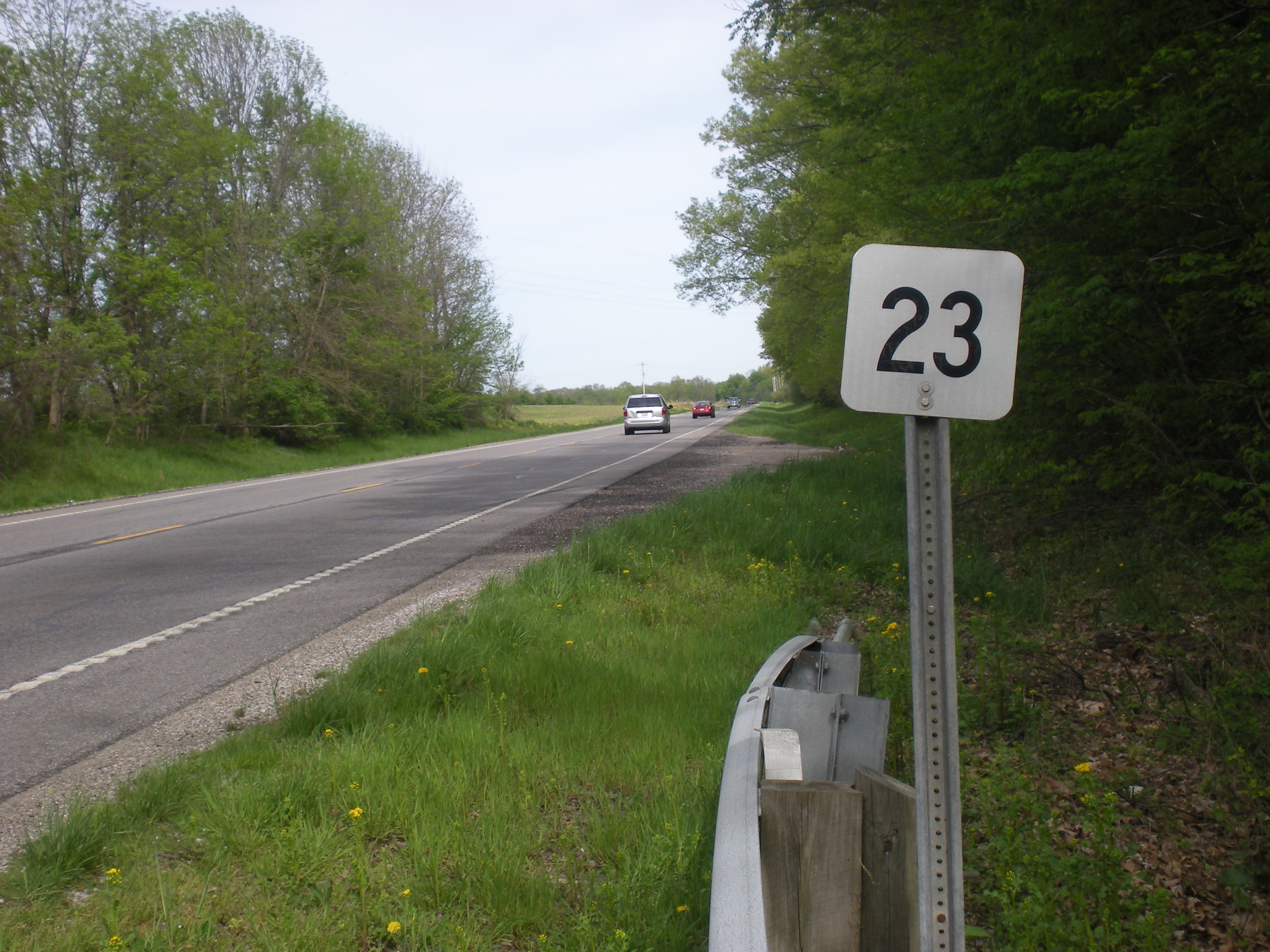
Mile marker 23 on US 36 in Delaware County, Ohio. It marks the location which is 23 miles from the Union County line.

A highway location marker is the modern-day equivalent of a milestone. Unlike traditional milestones, however, which (as their name suggests) were originally carved from stone and sited at one-mile intervals, modern highway location markers are made from a variety of materials and are almost invariably spaced at intervals of a kilometre or a fraction thereof (except in the United States, where miles are used on roadways). In some countries they may be known as driver location signs, milestones or kilometre stones.

== Route identification ==
Until the beginning of the twentieth century, highways were usually named rather than numbered. In most cases they had the name of the town or city to which they headed, for example The Old Portsmouth Road. Other ancient highway names include The Pilgrims Way, Watling Street and the Via Appia.

However, with the increase in private traffic after the First World War a simpler way of identifying roads was needed. Different countries adopted different ways of identifying roads. Under the 1966 Local Government Act Great Britain [excluding Northern Ireland] adopted a system of road numbering so that each roads had a unique number across the entire country. The relative importance of the road was identified by a "A" or a "B" prefix.

In France roads that were in the care of the national government were prefixed by "RN" (later just "N") and had a number that was unique across all of France. Roads that were maintained by departments had a number that was prefixed by "D" and were unique within the department concerned while roads that were maintained by communes had numbers that were prefixed by a "C" were unique within a commune. The advent of motorways meant an extension to both the British and the French methods of roads identification.

Highway location markers often have the route identifier marked on them.

== Location identification ==
Location identification is achieved by the highway location markers having numbers on them – usually the distance from some reference point.

A highway may be divided into more than one sector, with different sectors having different numbering sequences (though it is possible, as will be explained later for two sectors to share a sequence). Sector boundaries could be the boundaries of a state (as is the case of the United States Interstate highway system), or could be the middle of a large town or any one of a number of other locations.

Each one of numbering sequence is defined by its reference point and all the numbers within one sequence having a fixed relationship to the reference point and hence to each other (such as being at 0.1 km intervals). The reference point might be the start of the highway, it might be the start of the sector or it might be some artificial point that is located before the start of the highway. Such artificial points include the Zero Milestone in Washington, D.C., and Charing Cross in London.

In some countries such as Spain or the United States, highway exit numbers are identified using location identifiers.

=== Rerouting problems ===
If a highway is rerouted, then invariably its length changes. This can be handled in one of three ways:

- Location identifiers can be adjusted to take the rerouting into account. This is often impractical.
- The new section of road can be given a new identifier. This is often done in Italy.
- The sequence can be broken. Any adjustments in the sequence are recorded using the milepost equation.

== Carriageway identification ==
Until the advent of dual carriageways, it was seldom necessary to identify the actual carriageway. When this was necessary, the carriageway was often identified informally in terms of the town or city to which the carriageway is heading or by using one of the points of the compass. However, the use of highway location markers to pinpoint accidents made it necessary to identify the correct carriageway in an unambiguous manner so that the emergency services could get to the scene of the accident with minimal delay.

== Examples worldwide ==
These location marker examples have been chosen because each has a novel feature over and above route and location identification.

=== India ===
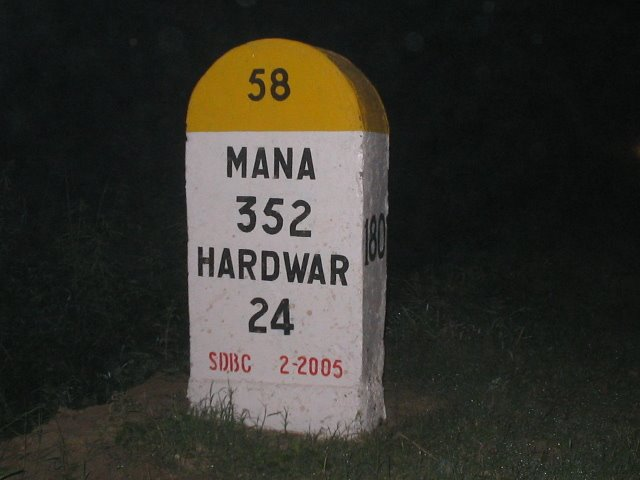
A location marker, 24 km from Haridwar on Indian Highway 58

The Indian location markers carry a number of different distances. The marker illustrated carries the following information:

- National Highway 58
- 180 kilometres from the start of the highway (in Delhi)
- 24 kilometres to the next big city - Haridwar
- 352 kilometres to the last town on the route - Mana, India (which is close to Mana Pass on the Tibetan/Chinese border, the terminus of the route).This is extremely false.

Although the sign illustrated uses Latin script, a number of Indian location markers use the Indian official language Hindi or the predominant language of the state in which they are located.

=== Ireland ===
Examples of location reference indicator signs used on motorways (blue) and national roads (green)

Location reference indicator (LRI) signs are provided on motorways and dual carriageway national roads. They indicate the route number of the route being travelled on, the direction of travel (N, S, E, and W for north, south, east and west) and the distance from the start point of the route. LRI signs are placed every 500 metres.

LRI signs are supplemented with location reference markings (LRM), which are road markings painted in the hard shoulder parallel to the road. They contain the same information as LRIs, though the letter from the route number is omitted. They are placed every 100 metres and also indicate the direction to the nearest emergency telephone.

=== Italy ===
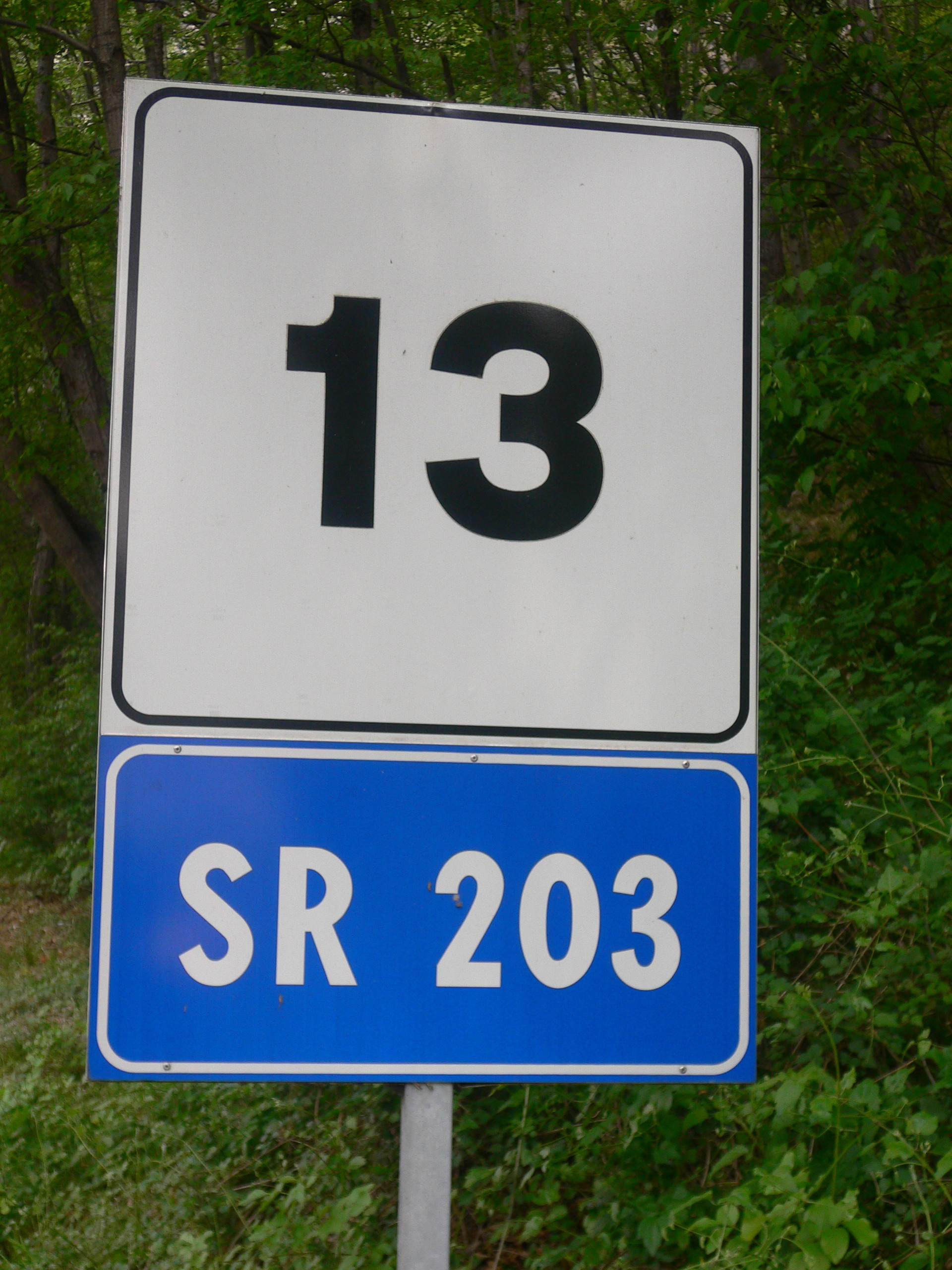
Highway location marker on the regional highway number 203 indicating kilometers only, located at kilometer 13 of the road

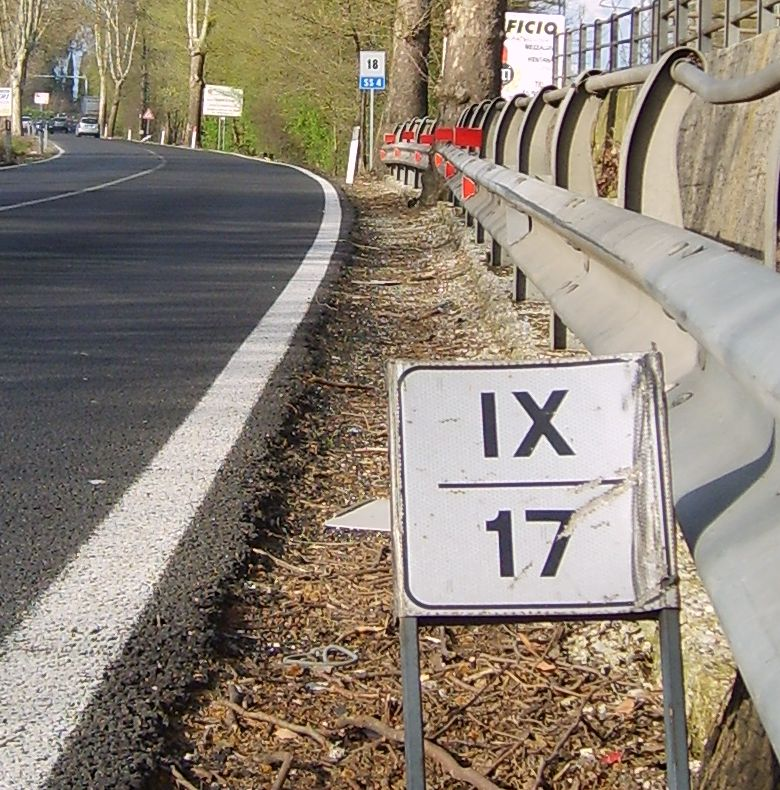
Highway location marker which also indicates hectometres, located at kilometer 17.9 of the road, also written 17+900

The highway location markers in Italy are part of the category of distance signs, subcategory of indication signs, and are of two types, those that indicate the distance in kilometers and those that indicate the distance in hectometers (100-metre intervals). In Italy, until before 1959, the function of mileage signals was performed by milestones. In the Consolidated Law Regulation of 1959, figure 103b mentions the use of the motorway confirmation sign, consisting of a white box on the left with the distance from the point of origin of the road and a blue rectangle with white characters in which the name of the next exit is shown with the relative distance in kilometers. In the circular of the Ministry of Public Works n. 9540/1969 "Motorway signs", signs with a similar function have been adopted to be installed on the traffic island.

Highway location marker on a motorway indicating kilometers only. On the left side the progressive distance from the location of origin of the motorway is indicated (i.e. that we are at kilometer 24 from the starting point of the motorway), on the right side it indicates the distance of the exit for the indicated location (i.e. that there are 4 km or 2 1/2 miles to get to the exit for Piacenza).

In Italy the highway location marker is a square white sign with the current kilometer (of hectometer) of the road written on it. This sign is accompanied by the sign that identifies the road if it indicates the kilometers (or hectometers) of a state, regional, provincial or extra-urban municipal road. If the sign indicates kilometers of a motorway the sign is accompanied by a green sign (positioned to the right or below the main sign) indicating the next exit with the distance remaining if the kilometer ends in 1, 3, 4, 6, 7 or 9, the next service area with the remaining distance if the kilometer ends with 2, 5 and 8 or the highway with the remaining distance if the kilometer ends with 0.

To mark the distance from the starting point of a road, progressive hectometric signs are also used. These signs are placed every 100 m (110 yd) and carry a two-line indication, such as IX/17. The sign indicates in the lower part the kilometer of the last kilometer progressivity sign (if you travel the road from the starting point) or of the next one (if you travel the road from the end point) and indicates in the upper part the hectometers in Roman numerals the distance to the last sign (if you drive the road from the starting point) or the remaining distance to the next sign (if you drive the road from the ending point). These signs are positioned on all types of extra-urban roads whose length is such as to make their use appropriate.

=== Malaysia ===
Malaysia has its own unique set of location markers in kilometre and hectometre (100-metre intervals). They include the route code, location number from the road starting point and sometimes direction of the carriageway. Green background are for toll expressways and blue backgrounds are for non-tolled highways.

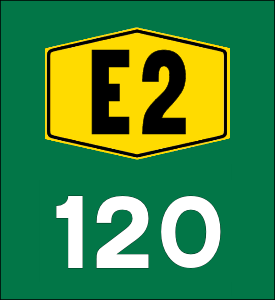
Driver location sign on tolled expressways every 1 kilometre

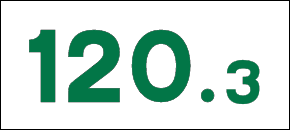
Driver location sign on tolled expressways every 100 metres

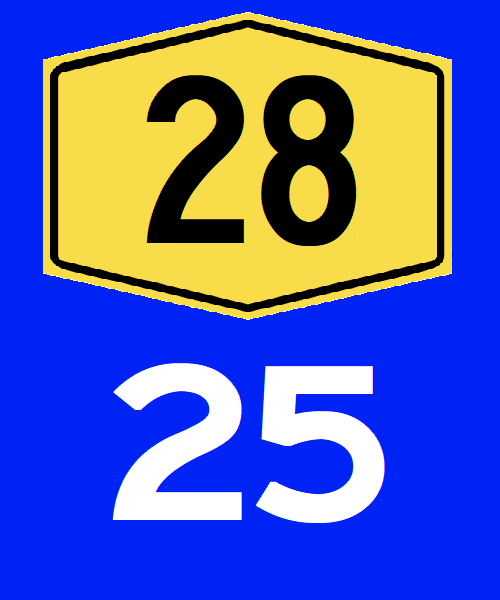
Driver location sign on non-tolled highways every 1 kilometre

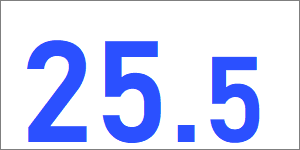
Driver location sign on non-tolled highways every 100 metres

On the other hand, federal roads have marker which are placed every kilometre and includes the distance to primary destination and location number. Every five kilometres however the marker includes the route code, distance to primary destination, distance to secondary destination and location number.

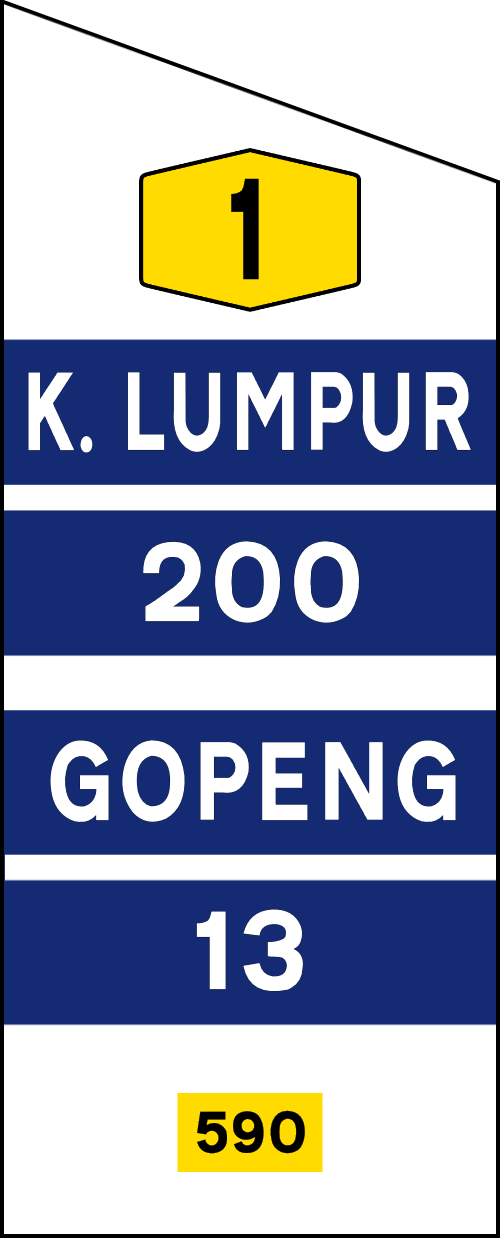
Driver location milestone on federal roads every 5 kilometres

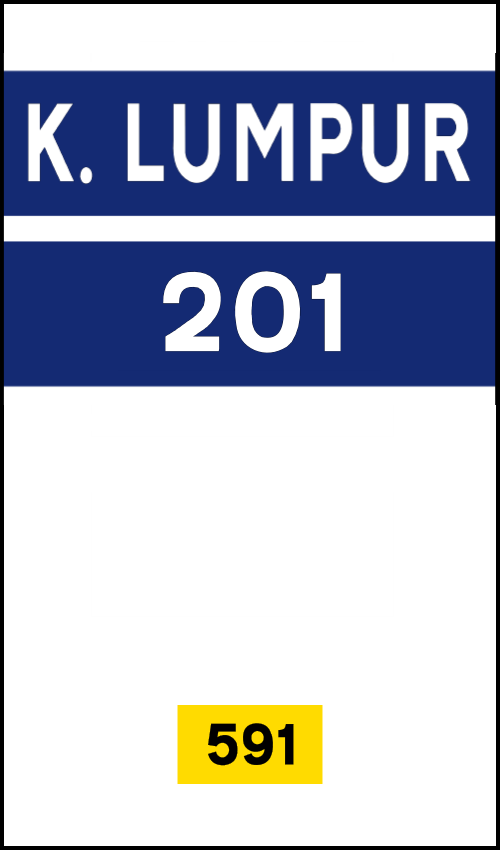
Driver location milestone on federal roads every 1 kilometre

=== Mexico ===
Different location markers used in Mexico.

In Mexico, location markers are white reflective signs with black lettering and borders. On two-lane highways (one lane in each direction), and using the direction of the chainage as a reference, the markers are installed alternately: signs with odd numbers are located on the right side of the roadway, and those with even numbers on the left. Starting at kilometer zero and every five kilometers, a route shield is added to the milestone. On highways with more than one lane in each direction, the signs are placed on both sides of the roadway. On separate-right-of-way bike paths, these signs alternate sides of the roadway, are visible from both directions of traffic, and the route shield is included every two kilometers, not five; additionally, they may display decimal values, separated from the whole number by a horizontal line.

=== Myanmar ===
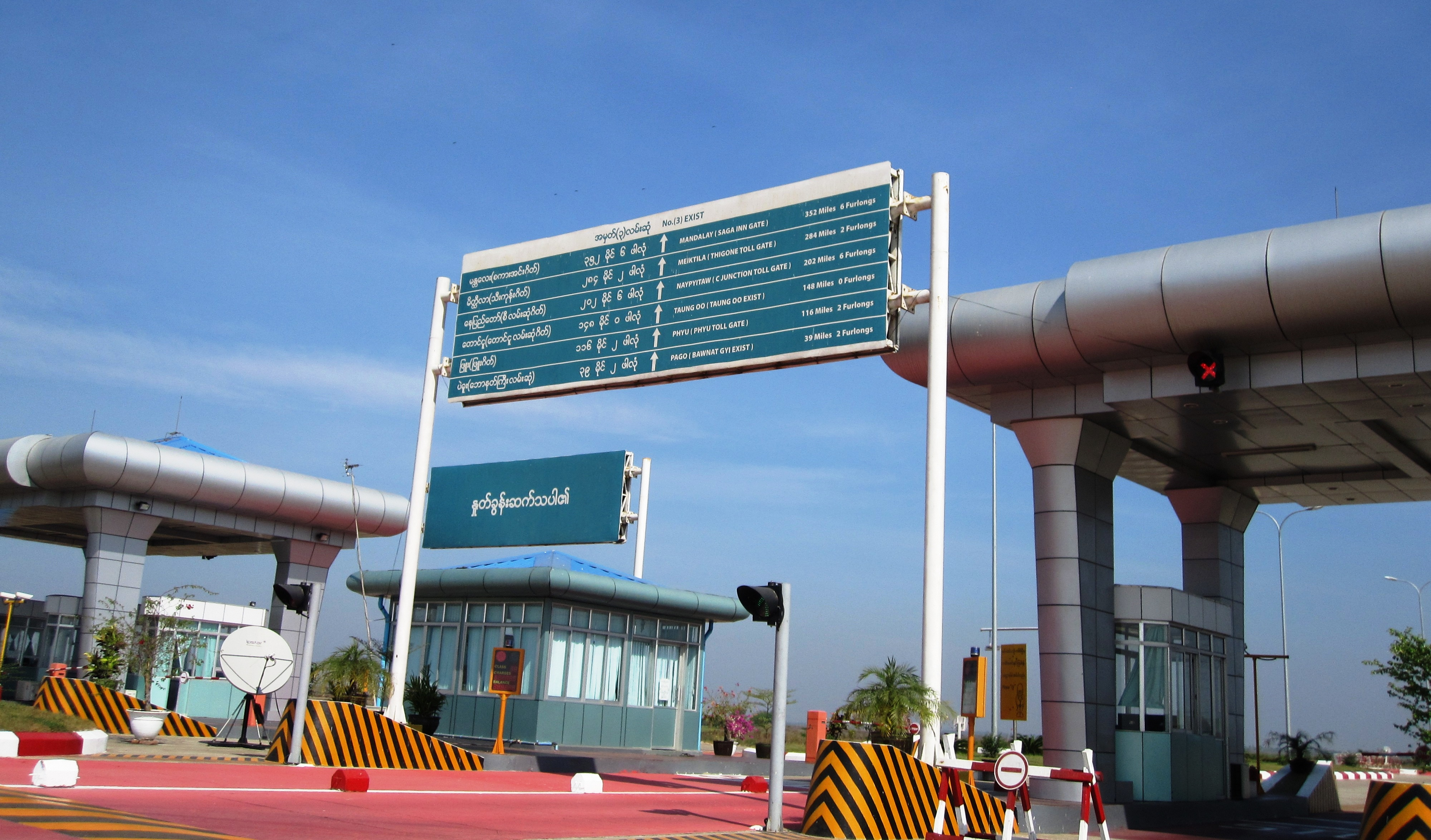
Use of furlongs on a highway sign near Yangon in 2010

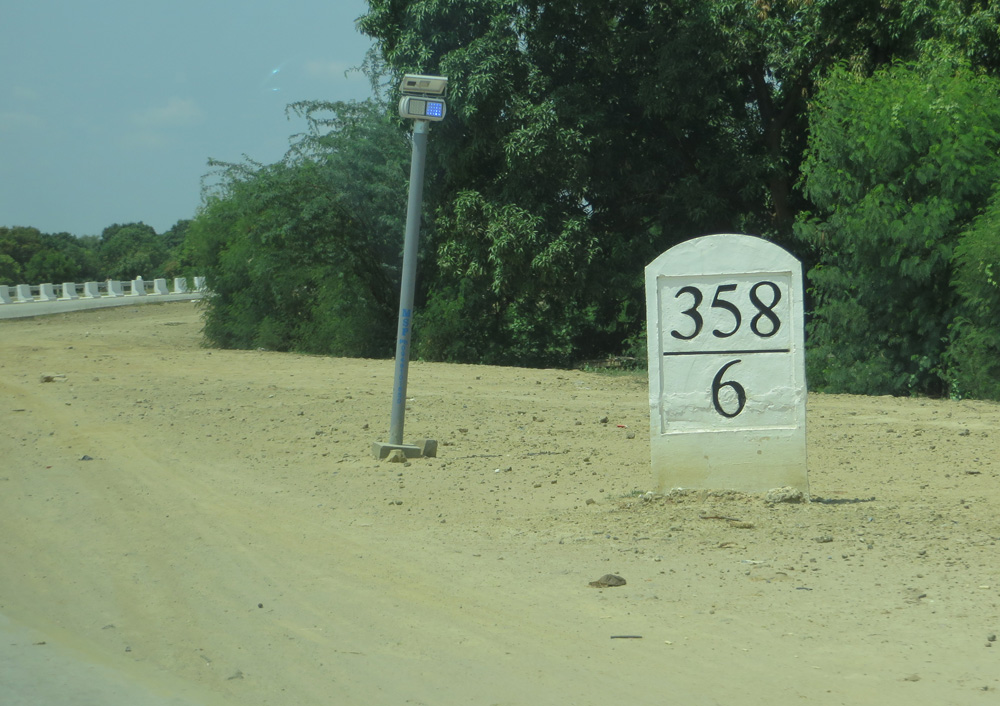
Mileposts on the Yangon-Mandalay Expressway use miles followed by furlongs.

In Myanmar, furlongs have been used at least until 2010 in conjunction with miles to indicate distances on highway signs, for example on the Yangon-Mandalay Expressway.

=== Netherlands ===
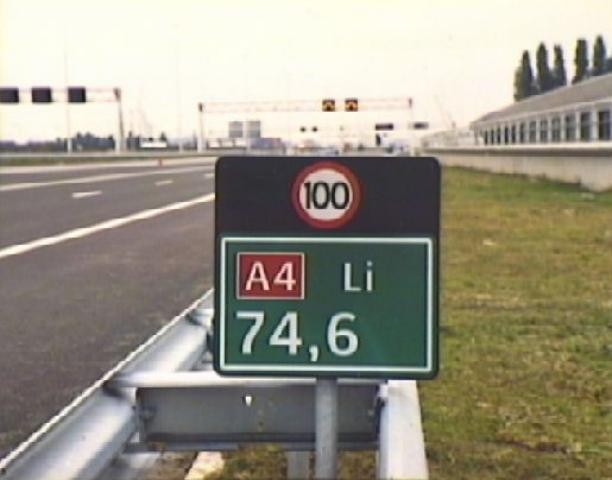
Hectometer plate with speed limit in the Netherlands

As the name suggests, Dutch hectometre markers are spaced at 100-metre intervals. In addition to showing the motorway number and location, they also bear a carriageway identifier – Li for links (left) and Re for rechts (right). The carriageways are identified as being left-hand and right-hand as viewed by somebody looking in the direction of increasing location numbers. By and large, Dutch location numbers increase as one moves away from Amsterdam, or in the case of roads that do not originate in Amsterdam, location numbers increase as one moves eastwards away from the North Sea. Carriageway identifiers 'a', 'b', 'c' and 'd' are used to identify slip roads on and off the motorway.

Another novel concept on Dutch hectometre markers is that speed limits are displayed on the marker boards when the speed limit is less than the (previous) national default of 120 km/h.

=== Poland ===
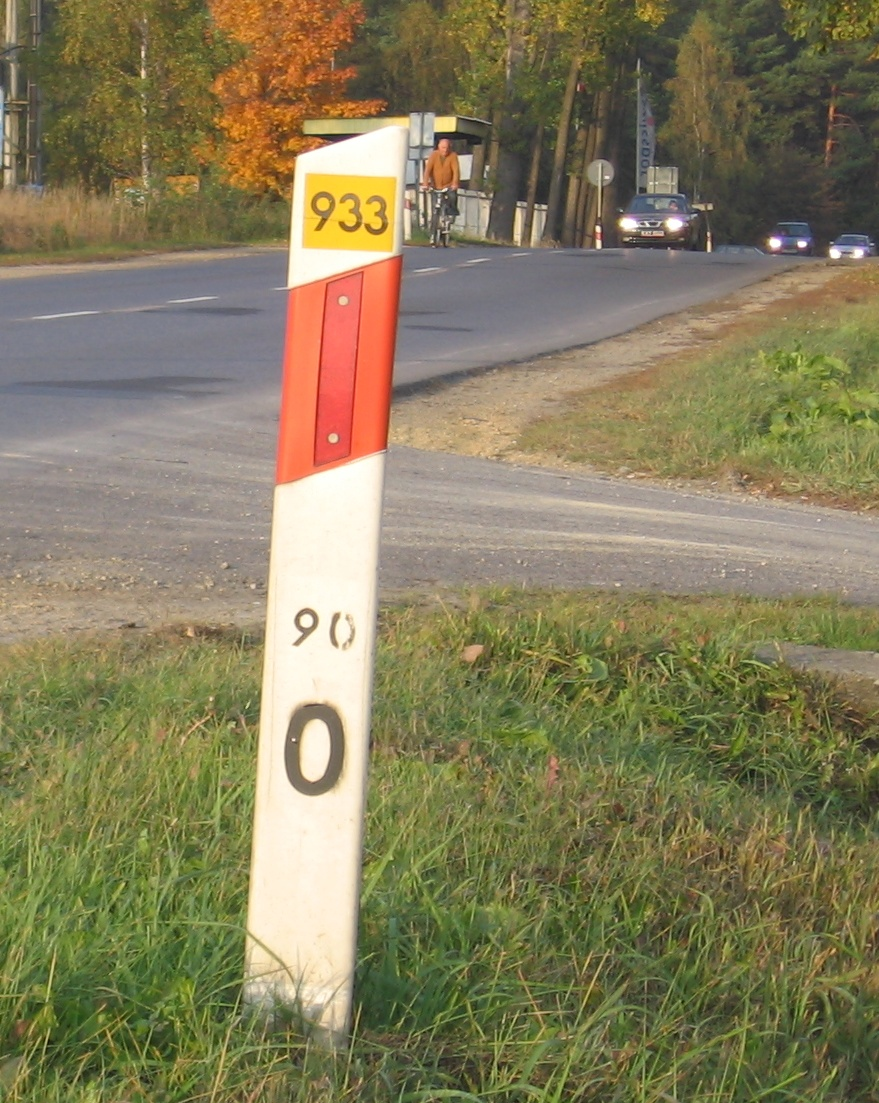
Delineator with kilometric point and road number on a voivodeship road in Poland

On Polish national roads (including motorways and expressways), as well as on voivodeship roads, distance is indicated on delineators every 100 meters. The road number is indicated on the delineator every full kilometer. On motorways and expressways with multiple carriageways, an additional rectangular white sign with the distance in kilometers is placed at every full kilometer.

Rerouted road sections, or sections extending beyond the original zero kilometer, are internally identified by a suffix added to the road number (for example, the Augustów bypass on the DK8, opened in 2014, is known as DK8i). The suffix is not shown on road signs, but newer delineators report the road number with the suffix. The combination of road number (suffixed where applicable) and kilometric point thus uniquely identifies the location on the road.

=== United Kingdom ===
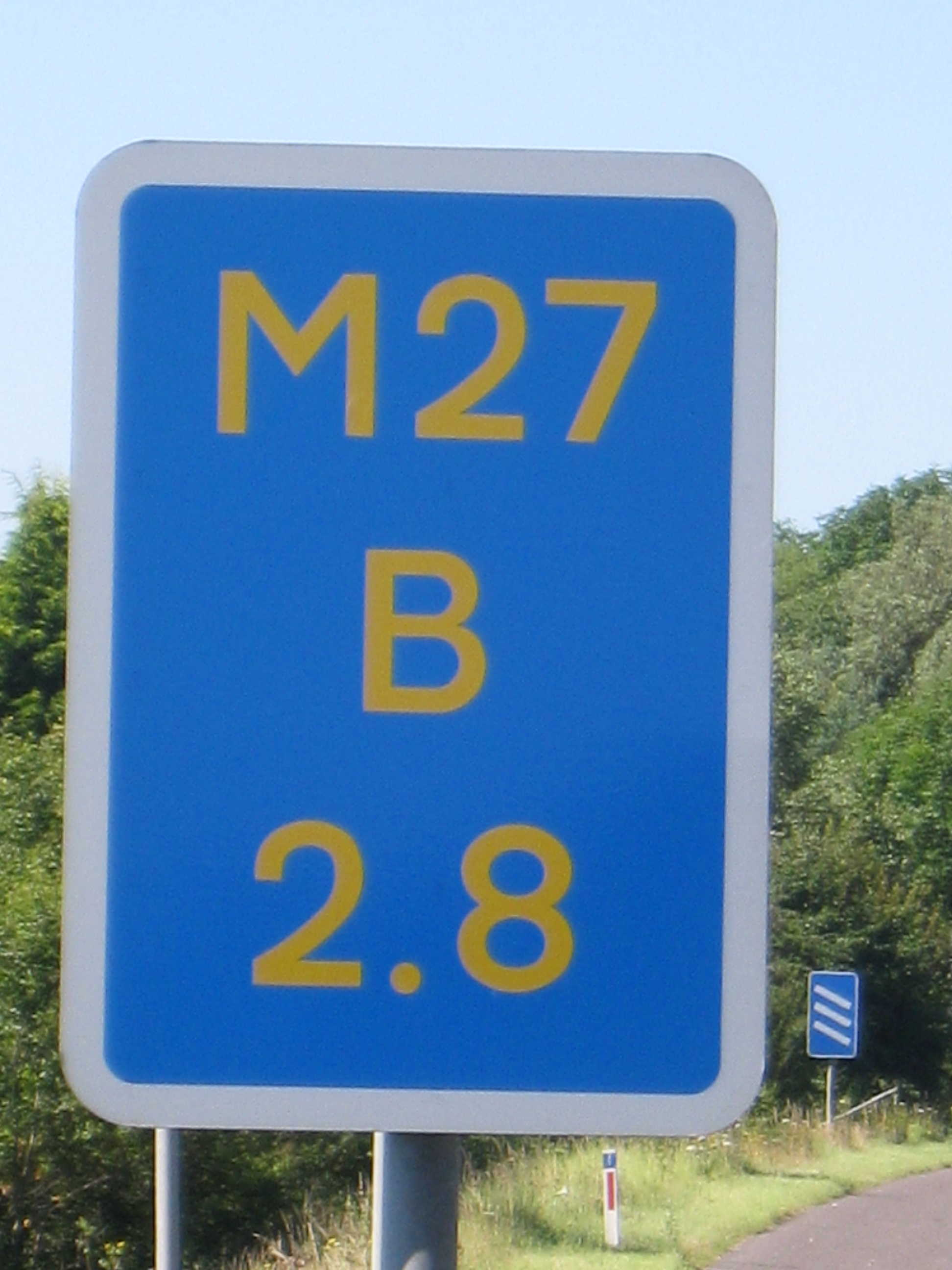
Driver location sign and Location marker post on the M27 in Hampshire

In the UK, driver location signs are placed every 500 metres (550 yd) along each side of motorways, and along some other major roads. They were first introduced in 2003, and they complement distance marker posts, small roadside posts at 100 metres (110 yd) intervals, used for road maintenance and administrative purposes. Both types of sign display a unique location number. The number is given without units but is the distance in kilometres from a designated datum location for the road.

Major British dual-carriageway roads have marker posts at 100-metre intervals. These posts, which are used for administrative purposes, give the distance in kilometres from some reference point. The digits on the posts are not designed to be used by the general public. There are no fixed rules for determining the reference points: they may be the centre of a city, an administrative boundary or follow some other rule. Marker posts on motorways also have arrows that point to the closest emergency telephone.

The advent of the mobile phone required a government rethink regarding marker posts. This has led to the erection of driver location signs in England (but at the time of writing, not in Scotland, Wales or Northern Ireland) at about 500 metre (about 1/3 mile) intervals on many motorways.

Driver location signs have three pieces of information:

- The road identifier
- The carriageway identifier
- The location

The location is identical to the location given on marker posts. The most commonly used carriageway identifiers are the letters "A", "B", "J", "K", "L" and "M". The letter "A" normally denotes the carriageway in the direction of increasing location numbers (usually away from London), "B" the carriageway in the direction of decreasing location numbers while "J", "K", "L" and "M" denote junction slip roads.

=== United States ===
Various versions of the federal-standard mile marker used on high-speed highways in the United States

In the U.S. Interstate Highway System, the numbers usually measure the distance to the southern or western state line, or the route's terminus, if the national southern or western terminus lies in that state. The numbering system for other highways varies by state; most use a system mirroring that of the Interstate System, other states, such as Illinois, California, and Kentucky, use the county line as the zero mile marker, while others, including Missouri, do not sign mile-markers at all (except on Interstates). Arizona has a rather unusual system, where a route's mileposts continue those from its original host. Often, the exits are numbered according to the nearest milepost, known as the mile-log system. From the beginning of the Interstate system until the mid-2000s, most Interstate highways had markers every mile. Since that time, many states have installed more markers every 0.25 mile, every 0.2 mile, or in some metro areas, every 0.1 mile. Some historic and scenic routes – such as along the Blue Ridge Parkway in North Carolina and Virginia and the Overseas Highway of the Florida Keys – use mileposts to mark points of interest or (in the cases of many businesses along the Overseas Highway) as a portion of their address.

Except in California (discussed below), mileposts are placed on interstate highways (and other major routes in some states) at one-mile intervals that indicate the distance through a state. Mileposts normally start at the western or southern point of entry of the route into the state, or the southern or western terminus of the route within the state, and increase heading north or east. Many states have added supplemental reference markers that indicate distance in fractional miles (tenth, quarter, half, etc.) in addition to mileposts for whole miles, either across the entire state or in select regions of the state.

==== California ====
California uses a postmile system on all of its state highways, including U.S. Routes and Interstate Highways. The postmile markers indicate the distance a route travels through individual counties, as opposed to mile markers that indicate the distance travelled through a state. Multiple other states, including Nevada, Ohio, and Tennessee, use similar county-based mile markers on non-interstates, but use standard mileposts on interstate routes.

A representation of a reference marker found on NY 940U

==== New York ====
New York reference markers are plates 8 in by 10 in (252 mm by 200 mm) that have three rows of numbers. Since the lettering is small (60 mm, 2.4 in), they are designed for use by highway engineers rather than motorists. The first row displays the route number, the second row the NYSDOT Region, and the third row the control segment and distance from the segment start. The control segment has one digit while the distance from the start of the segment has three digits and is given in units of tenths of a mile. Vermont uses a similar reference marker system on non-interstate routes.

==== New England ====
The New England road marking system was a regional system of marked numbered routes in the six-state region of New England in the United States. The routes were marked by a yellow rectangular sign with black numbers and border. Many signs were painted on telephone poles. The routes were approved by the highway departments of the six New England states in April 1922.

Prior to the New England road marking system, through routes were mainly marked with colored bands on telephone poles. These were assigned by direction (red for east–west, blue for north–south and yellow for intermediate or diagonal routes). The Massachusetts Highway Commission convinced the rest of southern New England and New York to use this system in 1915 (New Hampshire and Vermont already had their own schemes, and Maine also opted out), and it was the main system until 1922.

The New England road marking system, while limited to New England, was designed for expansion to the whole country. One- and two-digit numbers were assigned to major interstate routes, with three-digit routes for state routes (marked in a rectangle, with the state abbreviation below the number). In general, odd numbers ran east–west and even numbers ran north–south. The main exception was Route 1, which was to run along the Atlantic coast from Florida to Calais, Maine. A few of the major auto trails were not to be assigned numbers, instead being marked with letters—for instance, L for the Lincoln Highway and R for the Roosevelt International Highway.

In 1926, several of the routes were supplanted by the national United States Numbered Highway System. Except for Route 1, which became U.S. Route 1, the old numbers were not used, since the U.S. Highway System uses odd numbers for north–south routes and even numbers for east–west routes. While some of the routes that did not become U.S. Routes were disbanded in the 1930s, many of these routes were transferred to state highway systems, often retaining their original route numbers.

=== Zimbabwe ===
Zimbabwean milestones are constructed of cast concrete painted white with the kilometre distance indented and painted black. There is no distinction between state and national road-sign markings. They were originally sited every 500 metres by the Rhodesian Ministry of Roads and Road Traffic, starting at zero from the largest town or city. In 1980, the Zimbabwean government began placing new markers 1 km apart and damaged or missing half kilometre markers were no longer replaced.

== Identifiers on road concurrencies ==
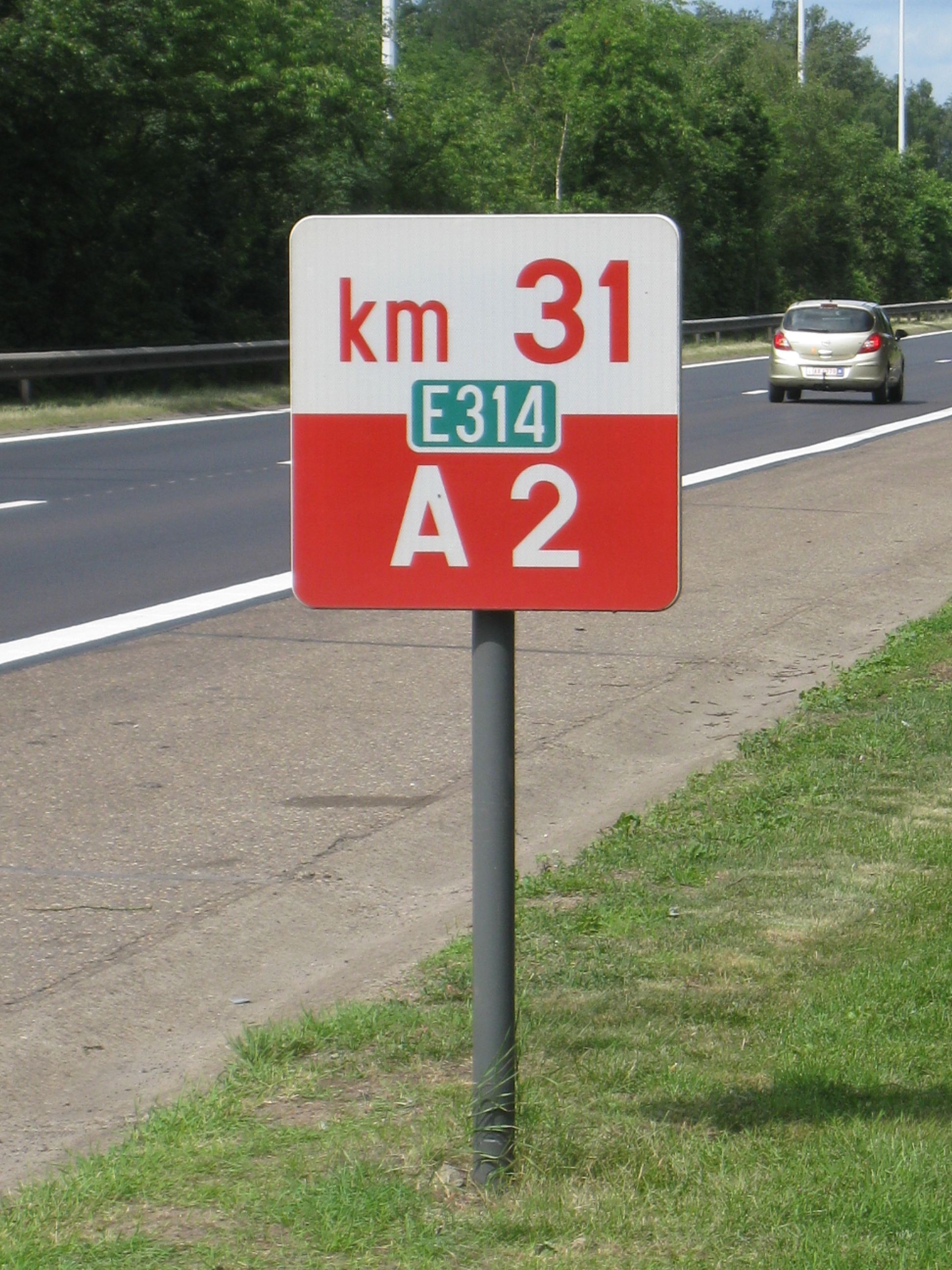
A route marker identifying both the (Belgian) A2 and the European E314

Roads often have two or more numbers. This can happen where two highway designations run concurrently, or share the same piece of road for part of their route or when the same road is numbered by two different authorities. Certain road authorities prefer to only display a single route identifier on their roads, but others display both route identifiers on their roads.

A common example of roads numbering by different authorities is the numbering of the European routes—all such routes have local numbers in addition to the "E number" allocated by the United Nations Economic Commission for Europe (UNECE), though is some cases, such as Sweden, the local route numbers have been changed to match the "E" numbers.

The picture shows a typical route marker in Europe (in this case Belgium) where both the European route number and the national number are displayed on the same location marker. The style of the route marker, apart from the green E-route indicator, is specific to the country concerned.

== See also ==
- Milestone
- Driver location sign (UK equivalent)
