= Boutros Advertisers Naskh =

- Category: Naskh
- Designer(s): Mourad Boutros, Arlette Boutros
- Foundry: Letraset
- Date released: 1977
- Re-issuing foundries: Boutros Fonts
- Also known as: Boutros Advertisers, Boutros Ads
- Website: www.boutrosfonts.com/Boutros-Advertisers-Naskh.html

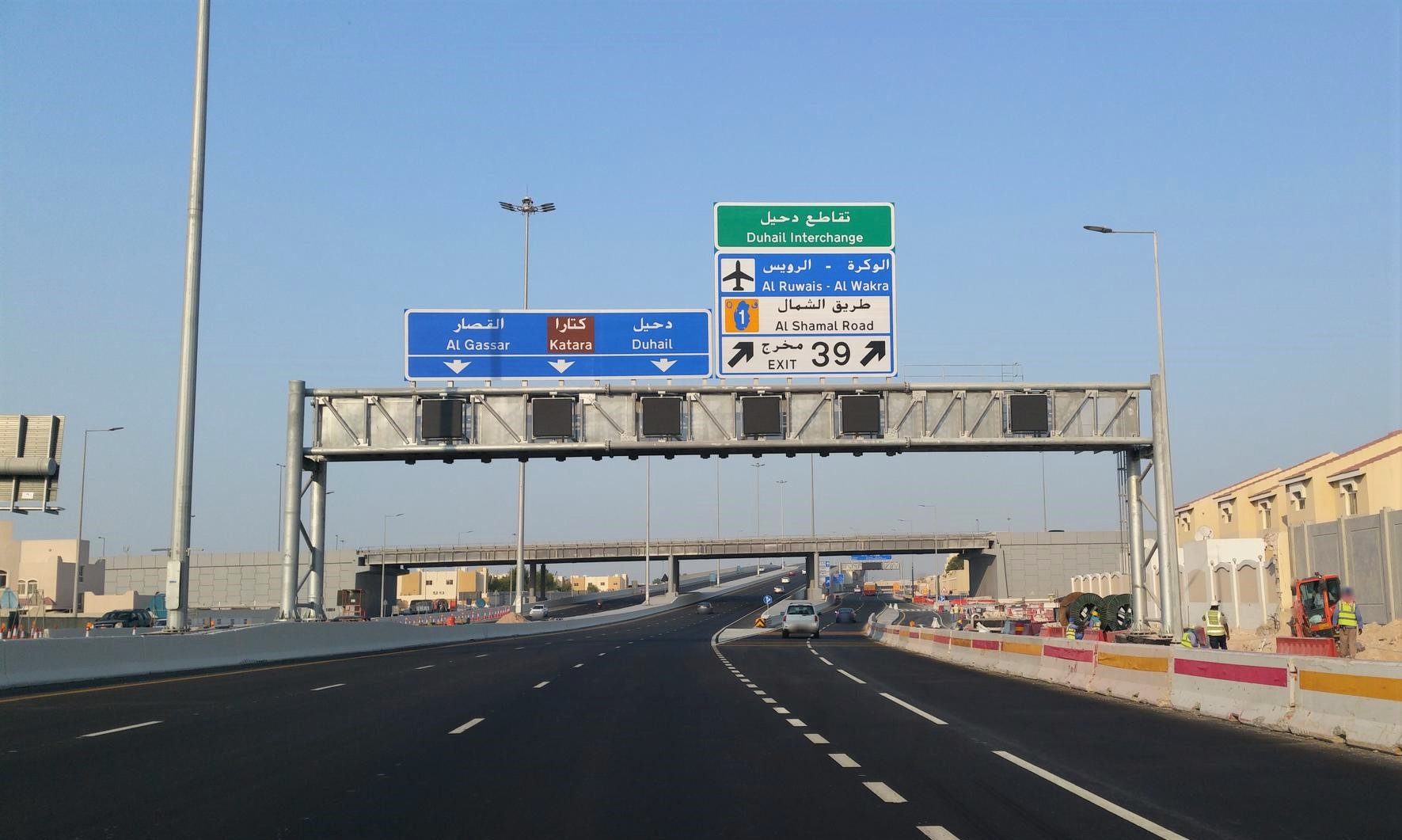
Boutros Advertisers Naskh in use on road signs in Qatar. The Transport typeface is used to display English text.

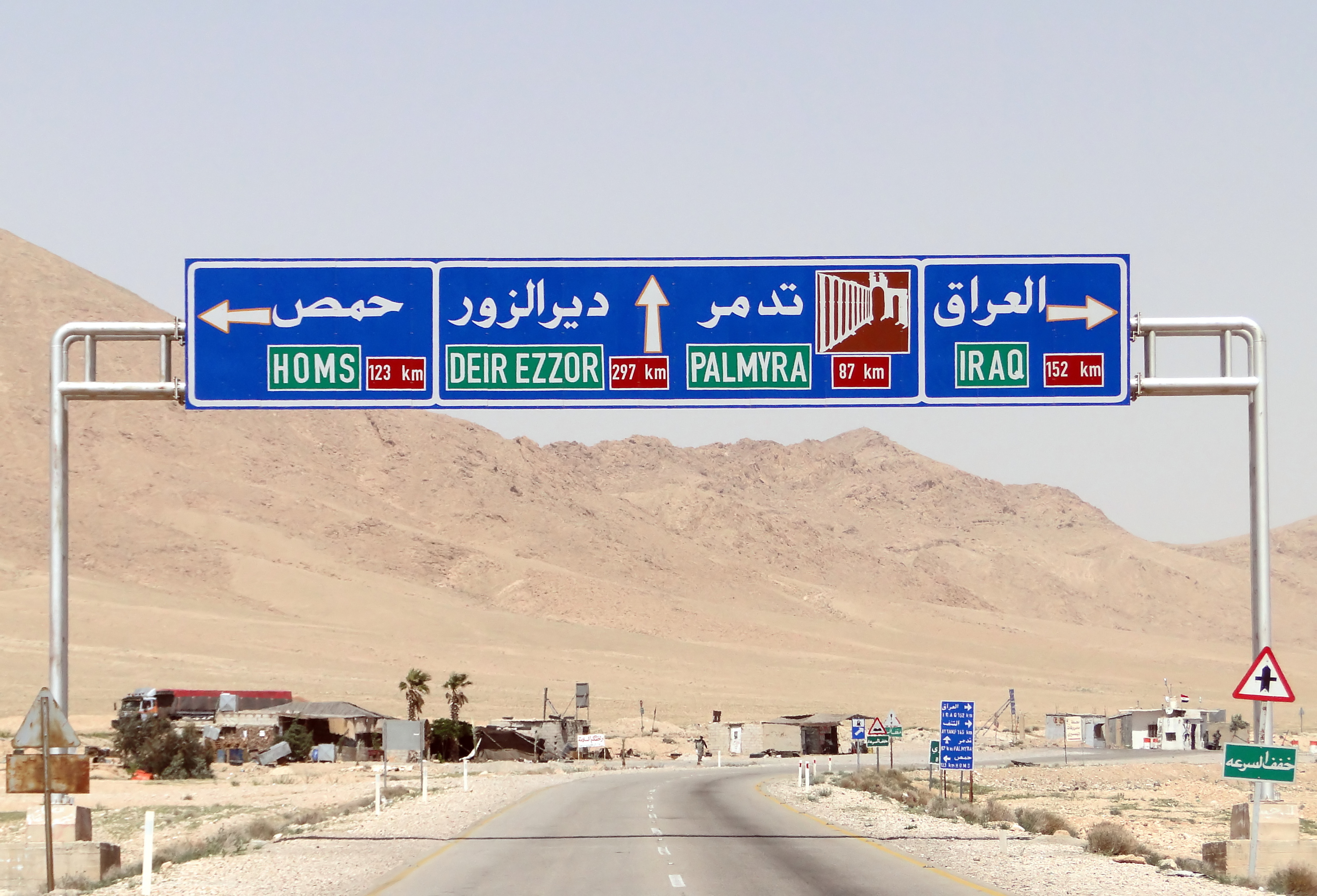
The typeface in use on a road sign in Syria, with a variant of DIN 1451 being used for English text.

Boutros Advertisers Naskh is an Arabic Naskh-style typeface developed by Lebanese typographer Mourad Boutros and his wife Arlette Boutros in collaboration with Letraset in 1977. It was designed to work in harmony with various Latin-based typefaces, such as Helvetica.

The font is available in light, medium and bold weights as well as italics. It also contains bold outline, shadow and inline variants.

== History ==
Boutros Advertisers Naskh was created in 1977 by Lebanese typographer Mourad Boutros and his wife Arlette Boutros for the British dry-transfer lettering company Letraset, which wanted to enter the Middle East market. The typeface was then commissioned by Bechtel Corporation and 3M Company for use on signage in Saudi Arabian airports around 1980.

== Design ==
The typeface, based on the classical Naskh script, was designed to work "in perfect harmony" with Latin typefaces through the "addition of linked straight lines to match the Latin baseline level" while respecting Arabic calligraphy and cultural rules.

== Usage ==
The typeface is commonly used on signage, especially for wayfinding. It is in use in Beirut International Airport and was formerly in use in Dubai International Airport.

The typeface is also in use for road signs in many Middle Eastern countries – namely Bahrain, Iraq, Kuwait, Lebanon, Oman, Qatar, Saudi Arabia, Syria and the United Arab Emirates. However, an empirical study suggests that such use is unsuitable, due to its "high threshold" indicating "low legibility on road signs".

According to Mourad Boutros, it is one of the most used and most pirated Arabic typefaces in the world.

Arlette Boutros designed a new typeface, Boutros Sign, alongside Eva Masoura, who designed the Latin accompaniment, intended to replace Boutros Advertisers Naskh on signage.
