= Bayburt Dam =

Coordinates: 40.5230°N 42.8090°E

- Interactive map of Bayburt Dam
- Location: Turkey
- Purpose: Irrigation

Reservoir
- Total capacity: 52 cubic hectometers

Bayburt Dam is a dam on the Arpacay River in Kars Province, Turkey. It was reportedly 95% complete at the end of 2009, and planned to be completed by 2011. It was one of the few large infrastructure projects under construction in Kars. It was planned to provide 10.32 cubic hectometres of water for residents of Kars and irrigate 5237 hectares of the Selim Plain.

== See also ==
- List of dams and reservoirs in Turkey
