= Road signs in the United Arab Emirates =

Road signs in Dubai.

Road signs in United Arab Emirates are regulated by the Roads and Transport Authority (RTA) Dubai. They are modelled on the British road sign system. The Transport typeface is used to display English text; no Arabic typeface is specified apart from the requirement that it be in the Naskh calligraphic script, with Boutros Advertisers Naskh being most commonly used.

== Route classifications ==
There are three types of route signs in the UAE for classified roads.

Blue signs denote roads that facilitate travel between different emirates. These are routes of national and International importance. Green signs denote roads that are wholly within the same emirate. Brown signs provide for local wayfinding to places of local importance.

== Gallery ==
=== Regulatory signs ===
==== Control signs ====
Stop

Give way

Give way to pedestrians

No entry

Give way to cyclists

==== Mandatory signs ====
Minimum speed limit

Proceed straight

Turn right

Turn left

Turn right ahead

Turn left ahead

Pass on either side

Keep right

Keep left

Roundabout

Buses only

Trams only

Taxis only

Goods vehicles only

Goods vehicles exceeding 10 tonnes only

Switch head lamps

Cars only

Pedestrians only

Bicycles only

Pedestrians and bicycles only

Pedestrians and bicycles only

Pedestrians and bicycles only - segregated

Pedestrians and bicycles only - segregated

Start of bicycle lane

Bicycle lane

End of bicycle lane

==== Prohibition signs ====
Maximum speed limit

No honking horns

No left turn

No right turn

No U-turn

No overtaking

No overtaking by goods vehicles

Speed limit per vehicle category

No pedestrians

No bicycles

No motorcycles

No light motorcycles (<80cc)

No quad bicycles

No goods vehicles

No goods vehicles (mass limit)

Maximum height limit

Maximum width limit

Maximum length limit

No buses

No taxis

No agricultural vehicles

No animal-drawn vehicles

No trailers

No motor vehicles

Axle massload limit

Authorised vehicles only

Directional restrictions sign

==== Parking control signs ====
No parking or waiting

No stopping or standing

=== Warning signs ===
Crossroads

T-junction

Side road junction to the right

Side road junction to the left

Staggered junction to the right

Staggered junction to the left

No through road on the right ahead

No through road on the left ahead

No through road ahead

Skewed side road junction ahead to the left

Skewed side road junction ahead to the right

Dangerous curve to right

Dangerous curve to left

Dangerous curves, first to the right

Dangerous curves, first to the left

Two-way traffic

Right lane ends

Left lane ends

U-turn ahead

Roundabout ahead

Road narrows on the right side

Road narrows on the left side

Road narrows

End of dual carriageway

Advance vehicle restriction: maximum height limit

Advance vehicle restriction: maximum width limit

Advance vehicle restriction: maximum length limit

Children

Pedestrian crossing ahead

Stop sign ahead

Give way sign ahead

Traffic signals ahead

Unprotected quayside or riverbank

Drawbridge

Camel crossing

Bump

Tunnel ahead

Rockfall

Overhead high voltage cable ahead

Cyclists

Railway crossing to the right

Uneven road

Soft verges

Slippery road

Gate ahead

Trams crossing

Other dangers

Railway crossing ahead

Steep ascent

Steep descent

Sand dunes

Crosswinds

==== Temporary signs ====
Flagman ahead

STOP/GO manual traffic control ahead

Roadworks

=== Information signs ===
Priority over oncoming traffic

Parking

No through road

One-way street

One-way street

One-way street

Beginning of tunnel

End of tunnel

Beginning of living street

End of living street

==== Highway signs ====
Freeway

End of freeway

Exit

Exit

Exit

=== Hazard markers and additional panels ===
Hazard plate - left

Hazard plate - right

Single chevron - left

Single chevron - right

Multiple chevron - left

Multiple chevron - right

T junctions chevron

Hazard maker

Motor cars

Trucks

Motorcycles

Cycles

No turning for good vehicles
