= Emergency telephone =

Public telephone for emergency calls

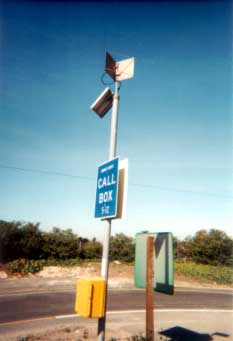
Call box on U.S. Interstate Highway

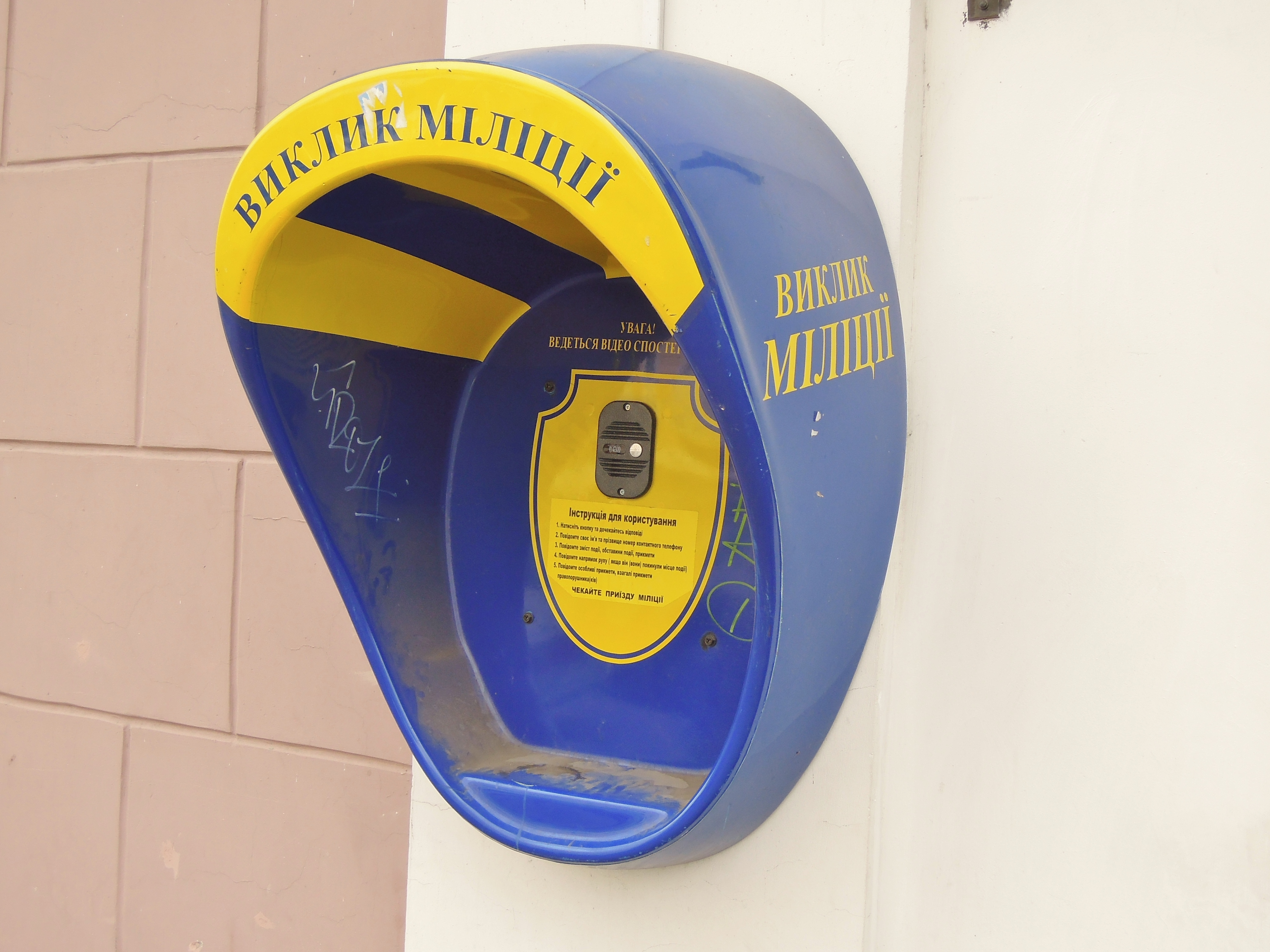
Street police phone in Odesa

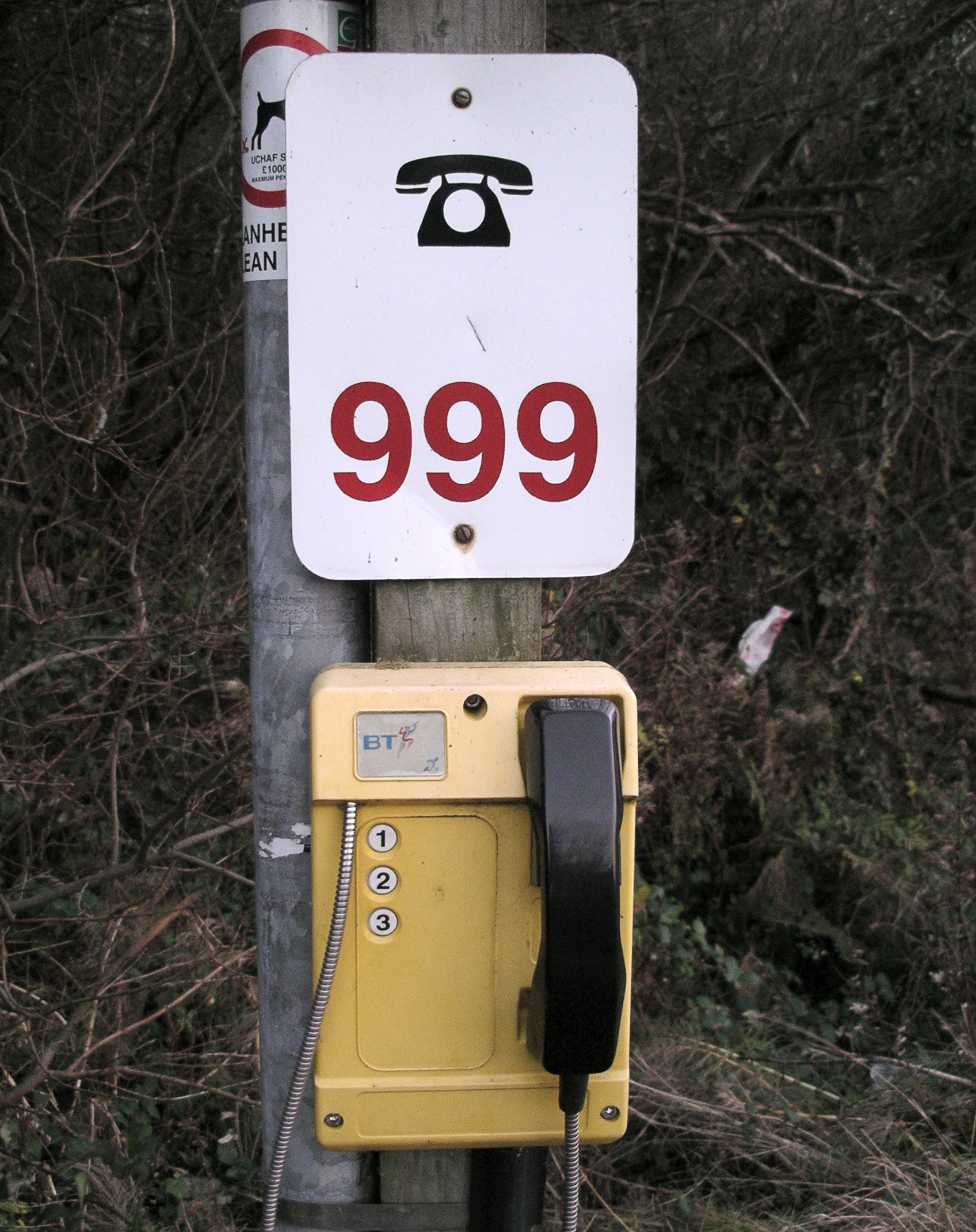
Emergency telephone on a beach at Trefor, Gwynedd, North Wales

An emergency telephone is a public telephone provided for making calls to emergency services, particularly on roadsides. With the wide availability of mobile phones, they are less needed, and have been removed in some places.

== Roadside emergency telephones ==
Although it is difficult to determine when and where the earliest highway emergency phones were developed, undoubtedly one of the earliest examples were the freeway phones developed in Western Australia in 1966. This system was developed by Alan Harman, an employee of a Western Australian security firm, Central Station Security Company, Electronic Signals Pty Ltd, who came up with the idea after reading of a pile-up on the Kwinana Freeway. The newspaper article mentioned that assistance had been difficult to provide to those involved in the pile-up. The system Harman envisaged was a series of telephone units in a box on a short post, spaced every 160 metres (0.1 mi) on Perth's freeways. Picking up the handset would trigger an alarm in the Main Roads control centre and police, fire or ambulance could then be determined by the caller. Harman developed the system with the approval of the main roads commissioner and chief engineer, by adapting the existing design of communication facilities used at the security firm in which he worked.

Emergency telephones are commonly found alongside major roads throughout the world. In the United Kingdom, orange "SOS" call boxes are spaced every 1.6 kilometres (1 mi) on all motorways as well as some major "A" roads, with roadside markers indicating the nearest phone. Emergency telephones were installed every 0.25 miles (400 m) on all limited-access highways ("Freeways") throughout Southern California in the United States beginning in the 1970s. In Melbourne, Australia, emergency telephones were introduced on metropolitan freeways in 1976, originally on the Tullamarine, South Eastern and Lower Yarra (West Gate) Freeways. On Italian "Autostrade" ("Motorways"), "SOS" emergency phones, generally coloured in yellow, are found spaced every 2 kilometres (1.2 mi).

These telephones are almost always marked by a placard or sign indicating a unique serial number or identifier which allows the authorities to know exactly where the caller is - even if the caller does not know - by having the caller read the short identifier from the placard over the telephone. Some phones are equipped with the equivalent of caller id and the agent receiving the call can identify the location even if the caller cannot. In most U.S. states with roadside call boxes, the call box placard has the route's milepost reading. In California, call boxes are identified by their mileage through individual counties using postmiles for reference. Each box has a 2-letter identifier for the county, followed by the route number, then a 3 or 4 digit number corresponding to the route's post mileage calculated in tenths of miles.

As cell phone use continues to increase, the need for emergency telephones declines and they are being phased out in many cities (see Decline, below)

== Other common locations for emergency telephones ==
Emergency phones can also be found at the ends of bridges or near cliffs which have a history of suicides. These calls are generally routed directly to the appropriate support agencies such as The Samaritans in the UK. They are also occasionally found along the coastline where members of the public may wish to report swimmers or boats in danger at sea. In the UK such phones connect directly to the Coastguard. Emergency phones are also found in elevators where entrapment is very common. These emergency phones connect to a live operator who can help people escape from the stopped elevator.

Some car models have an SOS button that connects them to the car company's emergency centre or the emergency services (112) and provide GPS location data. If the car crashes and the airbags inflate, then the emergency phone inside the car activates, even if the occupant(s) cannot reach it. Within Europe the eCall initiative has made this functionality mandatory in all cars sold from April 2018.

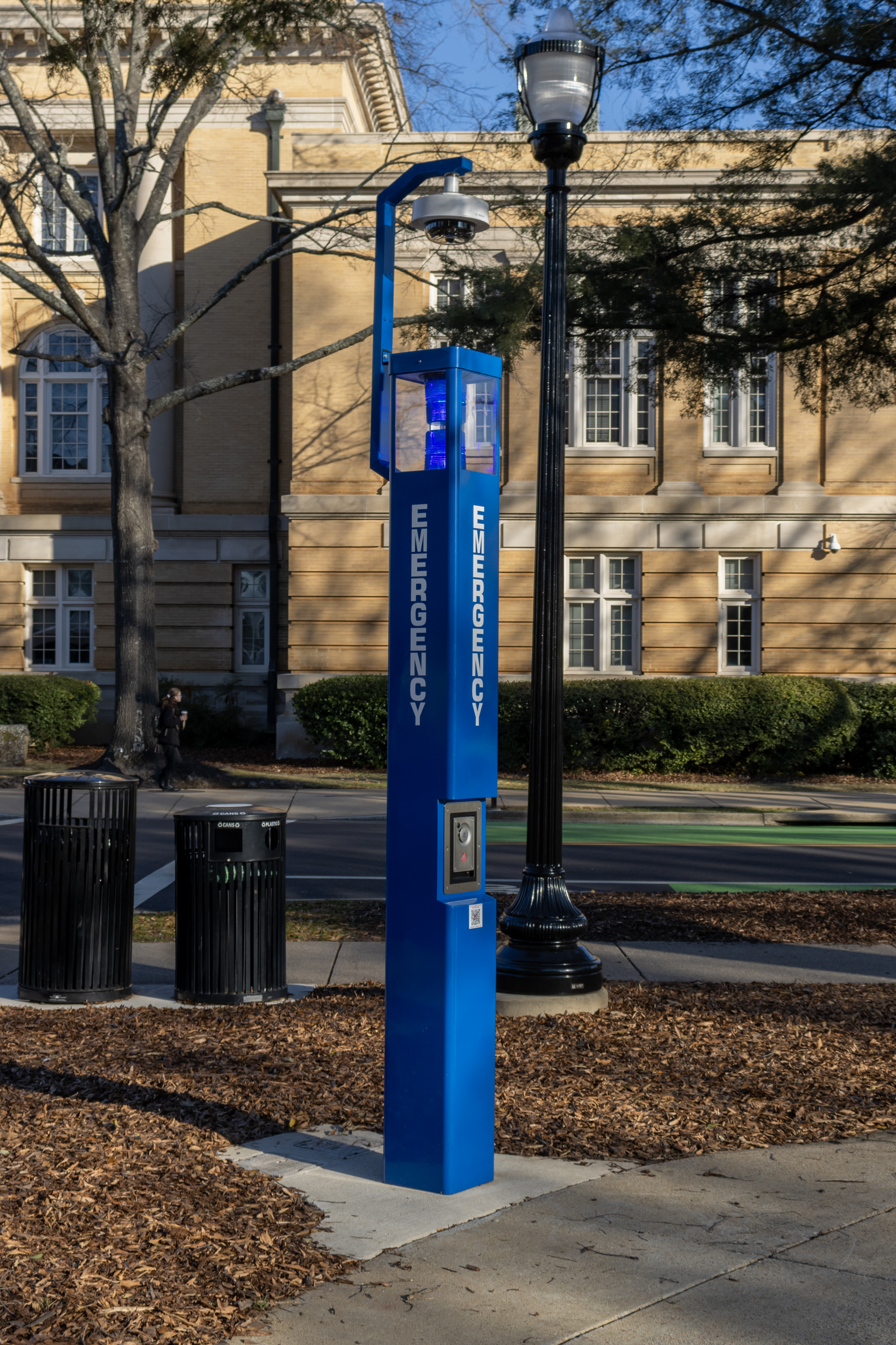
An integrated, pedestal style emergency telephone on a college campus

In some countries, they are also found in places where people may feel vulnerable or unsafe at night. They are commonly found on university campuses, urban parks and housing estates. These are generally linked to security companies who patrol the streets where the phones are located. And on campuses, they typically connect to the campus security or police.

== Decline ==
Improving coverage of the cellular network in combination with high maintenance and upkeep costs have resulted in declining usage of emergency telephones for highways. In Belgium and the Netherlands, roadside emergency telephones have been retired from service as of 2017. In case of emergency, drivers are expected to use their own cellphone to alert emergency services. In Wallonia, roadside emergency telephones were deactivated on 1 May 2021, following Flanders, which had done so in 2017. A dedicated smartphone application called Edwige was introduced to replace them, though this replacement service was itself discontinued in September 2024.

In California, freeway call boxes dropped from 98,000 uses in 2001 to 19,600 in 2010, or about 1 call per box per month. The annual maintenance of freeway call boxes for the Service Authority for Freeways and Expressways (SAFE) program in the San Francisco Bay Area was $1.7 million annually in 2011. During the 2010s, California removed most of their call boxes in urban and suburban areas, leaving them only in areas with minimal cell reception. In 2016, emergency phones were removed from Melbourne's Western Ring Road.

== See also ==
- Police box
- Emergency telephone number
- Highway location marker
- Driver location sign
