= Driver location sign =

British road marker post

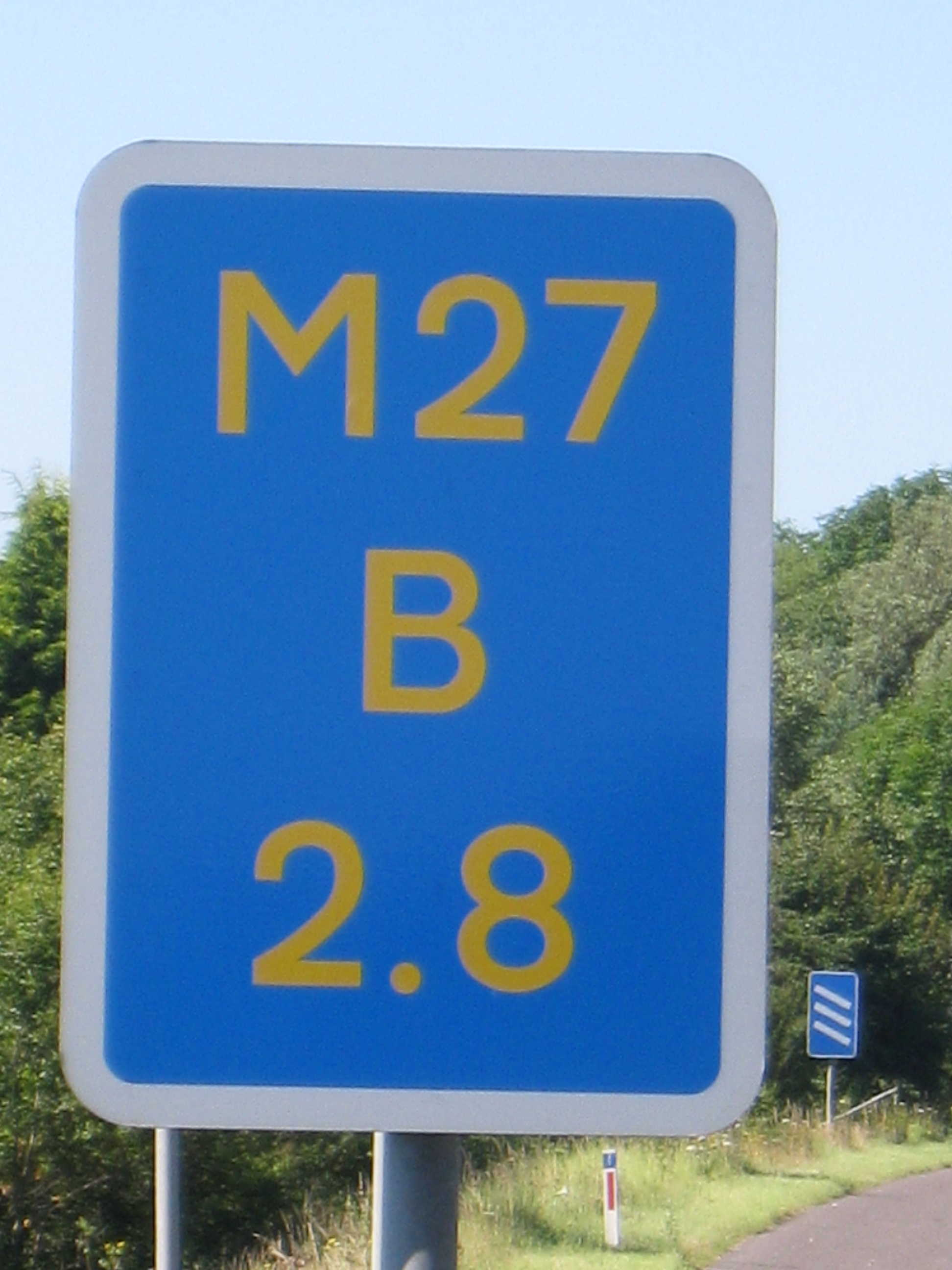
A driver location sign marking location 2.8 km (1.7 mi) on the westbound "B" carriageway of the M27

Driver location signs are signs placed every 500 metres (550 yd) along each side of English motorways, and some other major English roads, to provide information that will allow motorists to know their precise location. As of July 2009, roads in England, but not Scotland, Wales or Northern Ireland, have these signs. This information might be useful in the event of an emergency or breakdown. They were first introduced in 2003, and they complement distance marker posts (small roadside posts used for road maintenance and administrative purposes). Both types of sign display a unique location number. The number, although given without units, is the distance in kilometres from a designated datum location for the road, although signs meant for driver navigation are in miles.

== History ==
=== Distance marker posts ===
Since at least 1980, motorways have had distance marker posts, aka Blakedale Posts, installed at 100 metre intervals alongside the hard shoulder. These posts are used to help pinpoint road locations for maintenance and emergency purposes, and also show the direction to the nearest emergency roadside telephone. The numbers on the posts, for which no units are given, are derived from the distance, in kilometres, of the post from a reference datum location such as a city centre, an administrative boundary or some other feature. On the M25 for example, distances are referenced to a point near Junction 31 even though the section of the ring road between Junction 31 (post 186.6) and Junction 1a (post 5.7) is the A282, not the M25. On motorways distance marker posts also bear an arrow pointing towards the location of the nearest emergency telephone.

The number used on distance marker posts is also encoded into the numbers associated with motorway emergency roadside telephones. In this way motorway control centre staff can pinpoint the telephone from which a call is being made.

Items of highway furniture are commonly uniquely identified by a code number attached to or stencilled onto them. On motorways the number from the closest distance location marker is generally incorporated into such identifiers. They are also sent in the signal from traffic cameras to identify the location of the camera.

=== Driver location signs ===
Driver location signs on the M25

The requirements for the design and implementation of driver location signs (DLS) for motorways and all-purpose trunk roads are specified in a document published by Highways England.

These signs give the same location information as distance marker posts, but more visibly on larger signs, which are generally placed at 500-metre (550-yard) intervals. If obstacles prevent signs from being spaced at 500-metre intervals, then the interval must be reduced to either 400 or 300 metres (440 or 330 yd). By the end of the 2009 financial year, 80% of England's motorway network had been fitted with 16,000 driver location signs at a cost of £5.9 million (about £570 each). It was expected that the remaining 20% of the motorway network would be covered by April 2010 at a cost of £1.6 million. As of July 2009 driver location signs had not been erected in Scotland, Wales or Northern Ireland.

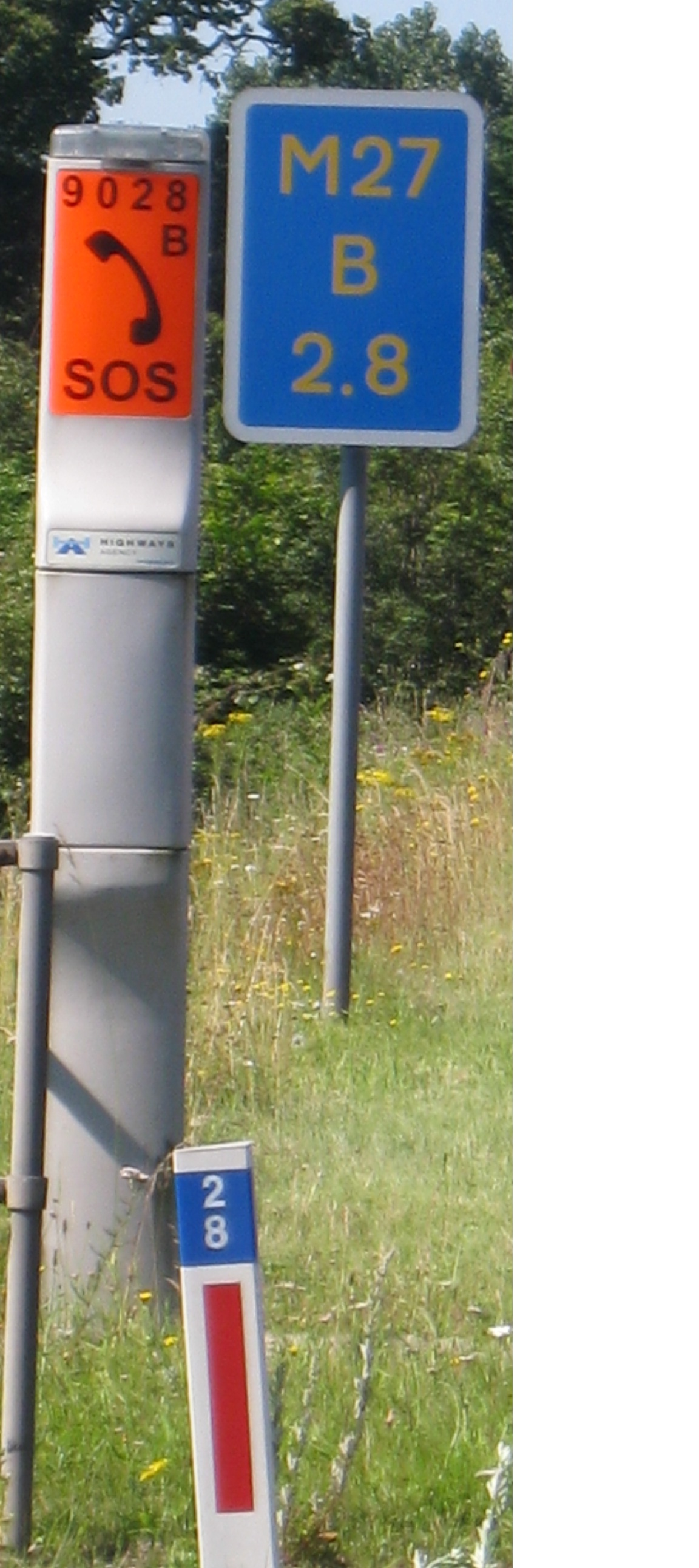
Driver location sign, emergency telephone and location marker post at position 2.8 on the "B" carriageway of the M27 in Hampshire

By the early 2000s mobile phones were being used as the primary means of reporting accidents. This required the government to rethink marker posts. By early 2007, after experiments in the preceding four years on parts of the M25 and M6 showed a 10% improvement in emergency service response times, a programme to erect driver location signs at 500-metre (550 yd) intervals on many motorways was commenced in England. The need for more visible roadside location information was shown in 2007, in an incident on a motorway before the driver location signs had been erected. The Devon and Somerset Fire & Rescue Service reported that after a serious collision on the M5, their control centre was inundated with mobile phone calls from drivers. Callers gave the operators locations stretching over 40 miles (64 km) of road. As a result, four emergency service centres were mobilised instead of just one.

Research on trial sections of motorways showed that emergency service organisations responded 10% more rapidly when a motorway had driver location signs than when it did not. Driver locations signs are more visible than the small distance marker posts, enabling motorists to know their location more accurately and emergency services to reach incidents more quickly. The analysis of an exercise run by the Highways Agency (Exercise Hermes) in which a serious traffic accident was simulated reported that call handlers in control rooms should request marker post or location sign locations when taking calls from members of the public.

Driver location signs have three pieces of information:

- The road identifier
- The carriageway identifier
- The location

The location is identical to the location given on marker posts. The most commonly used carriageway identifiers are the letters "A", "B", "J", "K", "L" and "M". The letter "A" ("Away from London") normally (but not always) denotes carriageways leaving London (or clockwise in the case of the M25 & M60) and "B" ("Back to London") is used for carriageways going to London (anticlockwise on the M25 & M60). Location numbers increase in the direction of travel of the "A" carriageway, and decrease in the direction of travel of the "B" carriageway. The letters "J", "K", "L" and "M" denote junction slip roads. This is illustrated below.

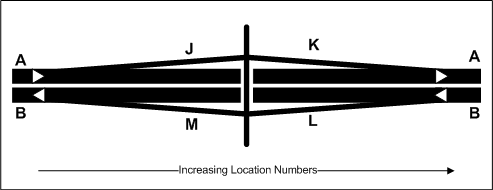
Usual carriageway identifiers used on driver location signs

Letters "C" and "D" have been allocated for service roads adjacent to the "A" and "B" carriageways. The regulations require that each driver location sign is unique within the United Kingdom.

== Rerouting ==
If a road is rerouted, then it is highly likely that there will be some changes in the end-to-end length of the road concerned which could affect the values on driver location signs. The publicly available Highways Agency documentation does not cover this possibility, but it will be noticed that the four carriageway identifiers "E", "F", "G" and "H" have not been allocated.

== Governing legislation ==
Section 64 of the Road Traffic Regulation Act 1984 authorises the Secretary of State for Transport to regulate the design of road signs in England, Scotland and Wales. The Secretary of State used this provision to authorise the design of driver location signs and to use the same location information on them as on the distance marker posts.

Driver location signs were added to schedule 11 of the Traffic Signs Regulations and General Directions 2016 (TSRGD). Diagram 2718 shows a driver location sign with the description, "Route number and location reference".

== Public awareness ==
In a road users satisfaction survey conducted during the second quarter of 2012 in the M25 area, respondents were shown a picture of a driver location sign and asked whether they had seen similar signs and also what they thought the signs were for. Some 59% of respondents had seen such a sign, but 76% of drivers did not know what the signs were for.

In 2021, Rule 277 of the Highway Code was updated with images to ensure that readers understand how to use distance marker posts and driver location signs to identify and communicate their location to emergency services.

== See also ==
- Milestone
- Highway location marker
