= Milepost equation =

Discontinuity in linear measurement

A milepost equation, milepoint equation, or postmile equation is a place where mileposts on a linear feature, such as a highway or rail line, fail to increase normally, usually due to realignment or changes in planned alignment. In order to make mileposts consistent with the real mileage, every milepost beyond the equation would need to be moved.

For example, an equation of 7.6 back = 9.2 ahead means that the feature does not have any section between mile 7.6 and mile 9.2, and the distance between mileposts 7 and 10 is only 1.4 miles. This would usually be caused by a relocation that shortened the distance by 1.6 miles. It is also possible for an equation to add mileage to what it would otherwise be; the duplicated mileposts receive a special prefix, such as Z.

== See also ==
- California postmile
