= Hectometre =

SI unit of length

hectometre
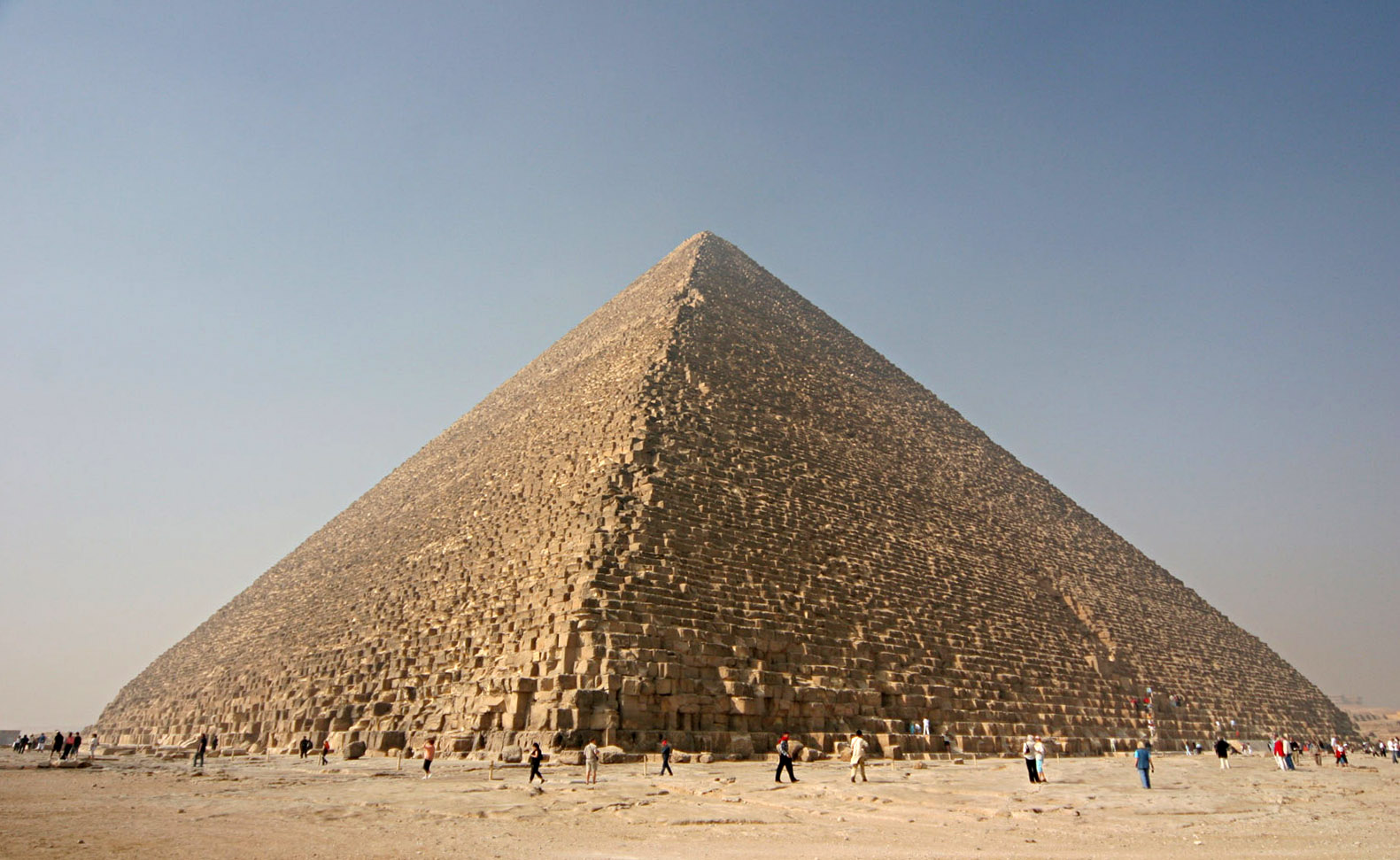
- The Great Pyramid of Giza is 137.7 metres high, which is 1.377 hectometres.

General information
- Unit system: SI
- Unit of: length
- Symbol: hm

Conversions
1 hm in ...	... is equal to ...
- SI base units: 100 m
- imperial/US units: 328.08 ft; 109.36 yd

The hectometre (SI symbol: hm), spelt hectometer in American English, is a unit of length in the International System of Units (SI), equal to one hundred metres and to one tenth of a kilometre. The word comes from a combination of "metre" and the SI prefix "hecto-", meaning "hundred". It is not commonly used in English. A football field (either soccer or American football) is approximately 1 hectometre in length. The hectare (ha), a common metric unit for land area, is equal to one square hectometre (hm^{2}).

The hectometre has sometimes been used for expressing the distance to a target in warfare.

== See also ==
- Orders of magnitude (length)
- Conversion of units
