= Transport (typeface) =

Road sign typeface used in the United Kingdom

- Category: Sans-serif
- Classification: Grotesque; Mixed; Signage
- Designers: Jock Kinneir; Margaret Calvert
- Date created: 1957-1963
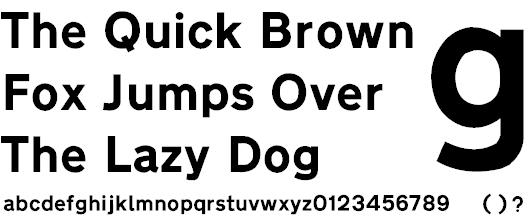
- Sample

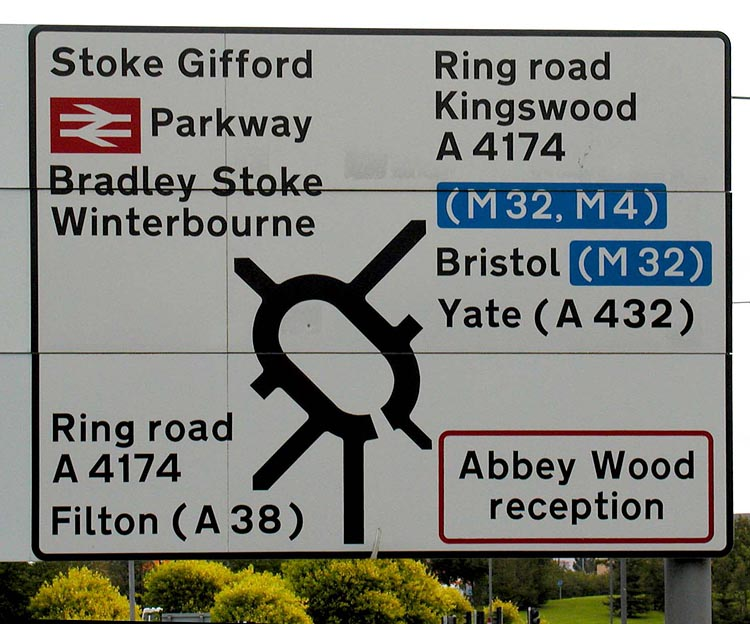
A road sign written mainly in Transport Heavy; the white on blue text is Transport Medium.

Transport is a sans serif typeface first designed for road signs in the United Kingdom. It was created between 1957 and 1963 by Jock Kinneir and Margaret Calvert as part of their work as designers for the Department of Transport's Anderson and Worboys committees.

== History ==
Before its introduction, British road signs used the capitals-only Llewellyn-Smith alphabet that was introduced following the Maybury Report of 1933 and revised in 1955–57. Older signs, known as fingerposts, tended to use a variety of sans serif alphabets as supplied by their manufacturers. For the kinds of roads on which either of these alphabets was likely to be seen, legibility was not a pressing issue, but the planning and building of Britain's first motorway in the 1950s was a catalyst for change.

The Ministry of Transport appointed an Advisory Committee on Traffic Signs for Motorways under the chairmanship of Sir Colin Anderson in 1957 and Jock Kinneir and his assistant Margaret Calvert were appointed as graphic designers to it. All aspects of signing were investigated and tested, initially on the Preston bypass (1958, now part of the M6 motorway), before their introduction on the (London–Yorkshire) M1 motorway a year later. The committee looked at examples from other European countries as well as the USA but Kinneir and Calvert found them somewhat harsh and unsatisfactory. Instead, they developed a more rounded typeface with distinctive tails to 'a', 't', and 'l', and bar-less fractions, all of which helped legibility.

The department, seeing the successful early results of this work then appointed another committee, under the chairmanship of Sir Walter Worboys and again using Kinneir and Calvert as designers, to look at Traffic Signs for All-Purpose Roads. Work for this also resulted in the introduction of the pictogram signs based on those recommended by the 1949 United Nations World Conference on Road and Motor Transport.

== Characteristics ==
Two forms of the typeface exist: Transport Medium and Transport Heavy. Both have the same basic form, but Transport Heavy is boldface, to allow easier readability of black letters on white backgrounds, such as those used on non-primary roads, while Transport Medium is lighter, and is used for white letters on dark backgrounds, such as the green primary-route signs.

The Transport fonts are the only ones allowed on UK road signs (except for motorway signs, where route numbers appear in their own separate typeface known as Motorway).

Only a limited number of symbols are available in Transport, mainly those commonly used in road signs, such as apostrophes, the pound sign and certain vulgar fractions such as ½ and ⅓. The original Transport fonts contained no diacritics, but since the publication of the 2016 Traffic Signs Regulations and General Directions includes grave accents for use on road signs in Scotland.

== Road signs outside Britain ==
Although developed for road signage in the United Kingdom, the typeface has seen use in the British government website and some government letters. It has also been used for road signage in many other countries around the world; in addition to the Crown dependencies, British overseas territories and some limited residual usage in Commonwealth states, the typeface is also used in Hong Kong, Iceland, Ireland, Greece (on non-motorway roads), Portugal, and in much of the Middle East, often with adaptations to include diacritics and other letters not used in English.

- Transport was expanded with the Greek alphabet to be used in Greece. In Greece and other such countries where non-Latin scripts (such as the Perso-Arabic script) are used, Transport is often used for Latin transliterations.
- Road signs in the Republic of Ireland use all-caps Transport Heavy for English names. Irish names are set in mixed-case Transport Heavy oblique with modifications to certain letters - a is changed to a single-storey form, i (which was formerly dotless) has a curve on the bottom, and A, M and N are tall copies of their lowercase forms.
- Denmark uses a modification with added spacing and changes to the J and numerals, known as Dansk Vejtavleskrift.

In Indonesia, electronic variable message signs have used Transport since April 2014.

=== Countries outside of the UK using Transport in road signage ===
- Bangladesh
- Greece (Greek letters added)
- Hong Kong
- Iceland
- India
- Indonesia (variable message signs only)
- Iran
- Ireland
- Italy (bolder variant called Alfabeto Normale and a condensed width thereof called Alfabeto Stretto)
- Kuwait
- Malaysia
- Malta
- Nepal
- New Zealand (Parking Area signs only)
- Oman
- Portugal
- Qatar
- Singapore (Parking Area signs only)
- Spain (bolder variant called Carretera Convencional)
- United Arab Emirates

== Digitisations ==
The original Transport family, with its two weights, has been digitised by URW++.

=== New Transport ===
It is an updated and expanded version of the original typeface, been developed by Henrik Kubel of A2/SW/HK Limited and Margaret Calvert during 2012.

The original release includes six different weights (Thin, Light, Regular, Medium, Bold, Black) with complementary oblique stylings. It also has other features including text figures and small capitals. Semibold weight was added between 2 August 2018 and 2 September 2018.

==== GDS Transport ====
It is a custom version of New Transport designed by New Transport designers, for use in the UK Government Digital Service web site (GOV.UK) in 2012, where it has been selected as the sole font for all text.

=== Transport New ===
An updated though unofficial family based upon Transport was first released by independent foundry K-Type in 2008. The family includes Light, Medium and Heavy weights along with true italics which were added in 2015.

=== Other ===
Jörg Hemker designed two typefaces that are inspired from the Transport typeface: FF Nort and FF Nort Headline. Both typefaces support Greek and Cyrillic.

== Gallery ==
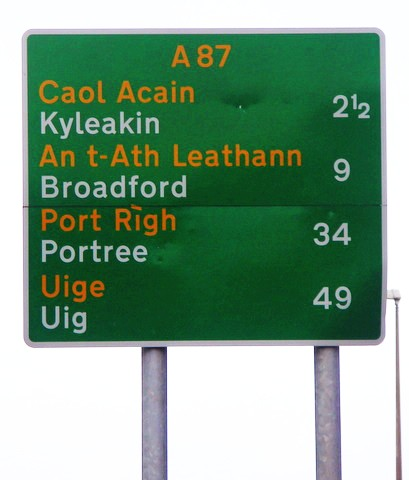
A Scottish sign using the typeface on the Isle of Skye, with place names given in both Scots Gaelic and English, and distances shown in miles.

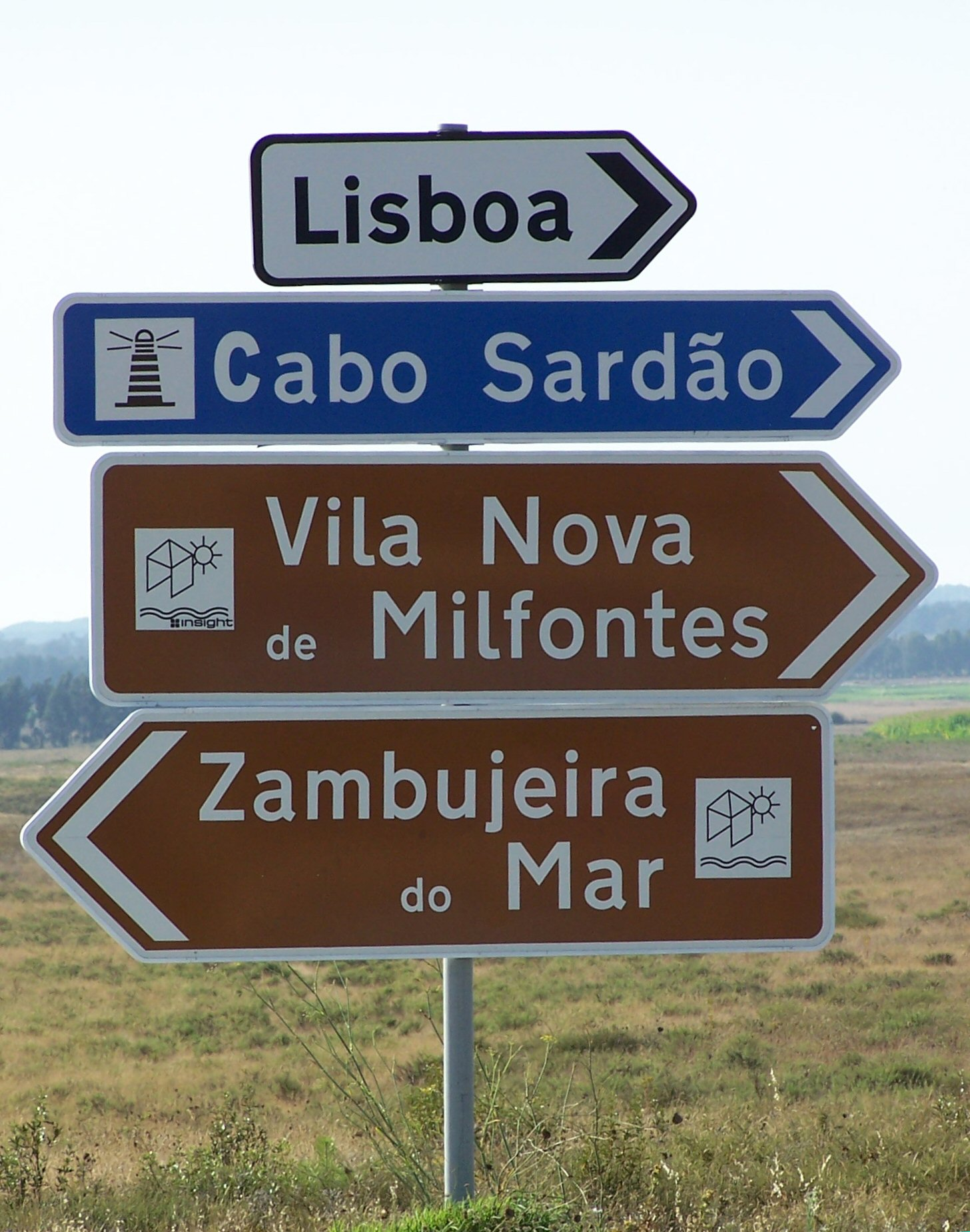
Example of the use of the typeface in road signs in Portugal

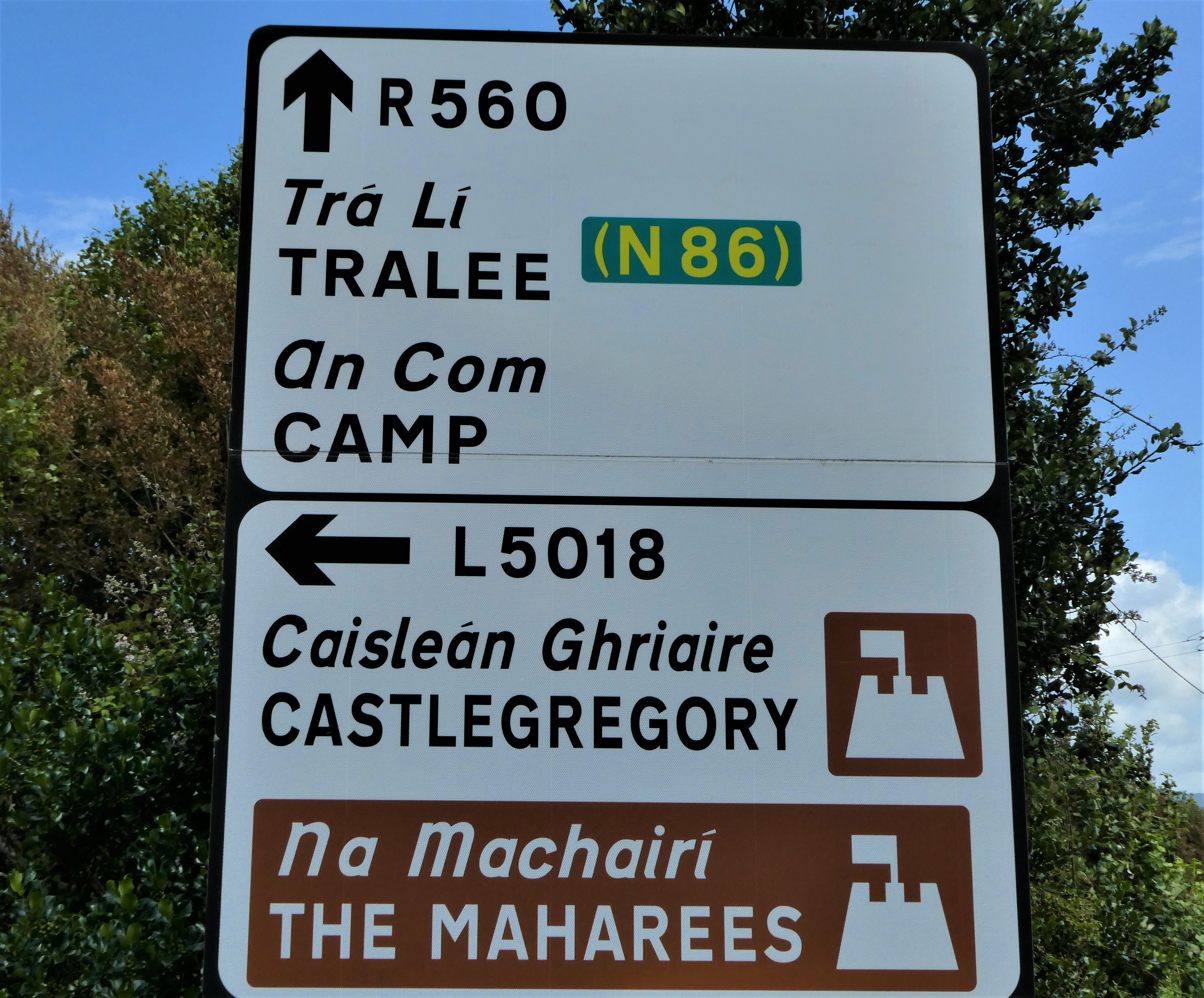
Irish road sign using special character forms for A, a, i, and capitals M and N, for Irish text

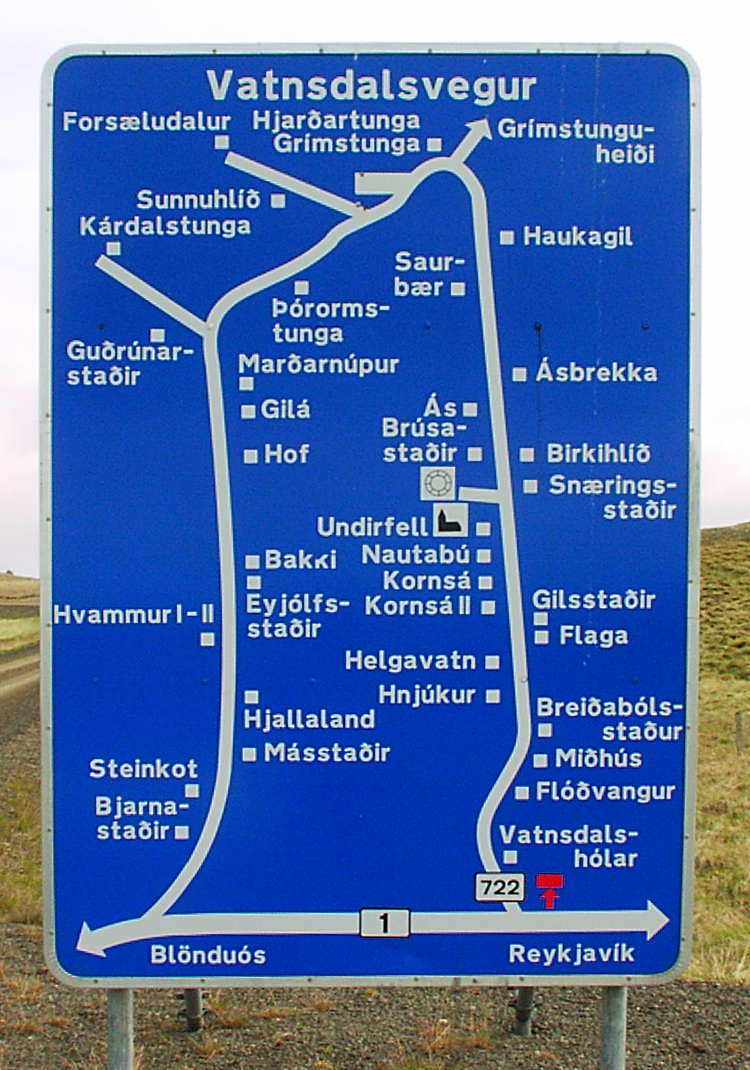
The typeface is in use on Icelandic road signs. This example shows the locations of villages and farms in a rural area of the country.

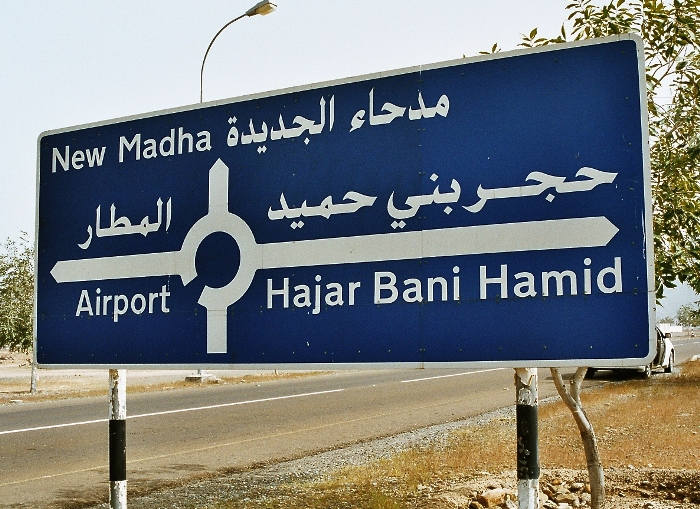
Use of the typeface within the Omani enclave of Madha, within the United Arab Emirates. The Latin alphabet text has been translated from the Arabic, which is also shown.

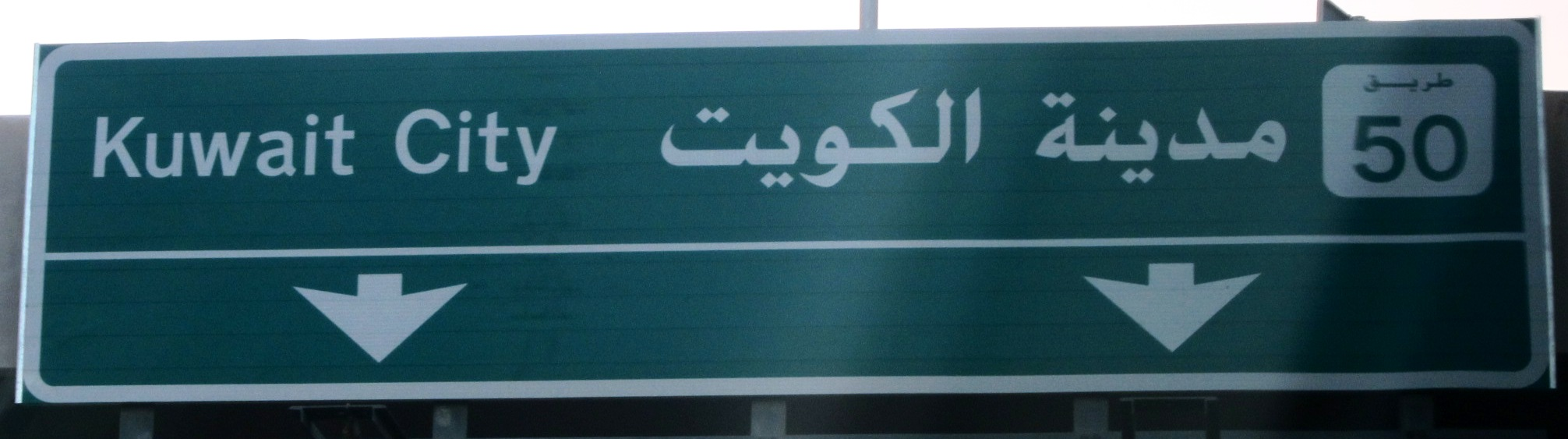
Another example of the typeface in use in the Middle East, this time in Kuwait.

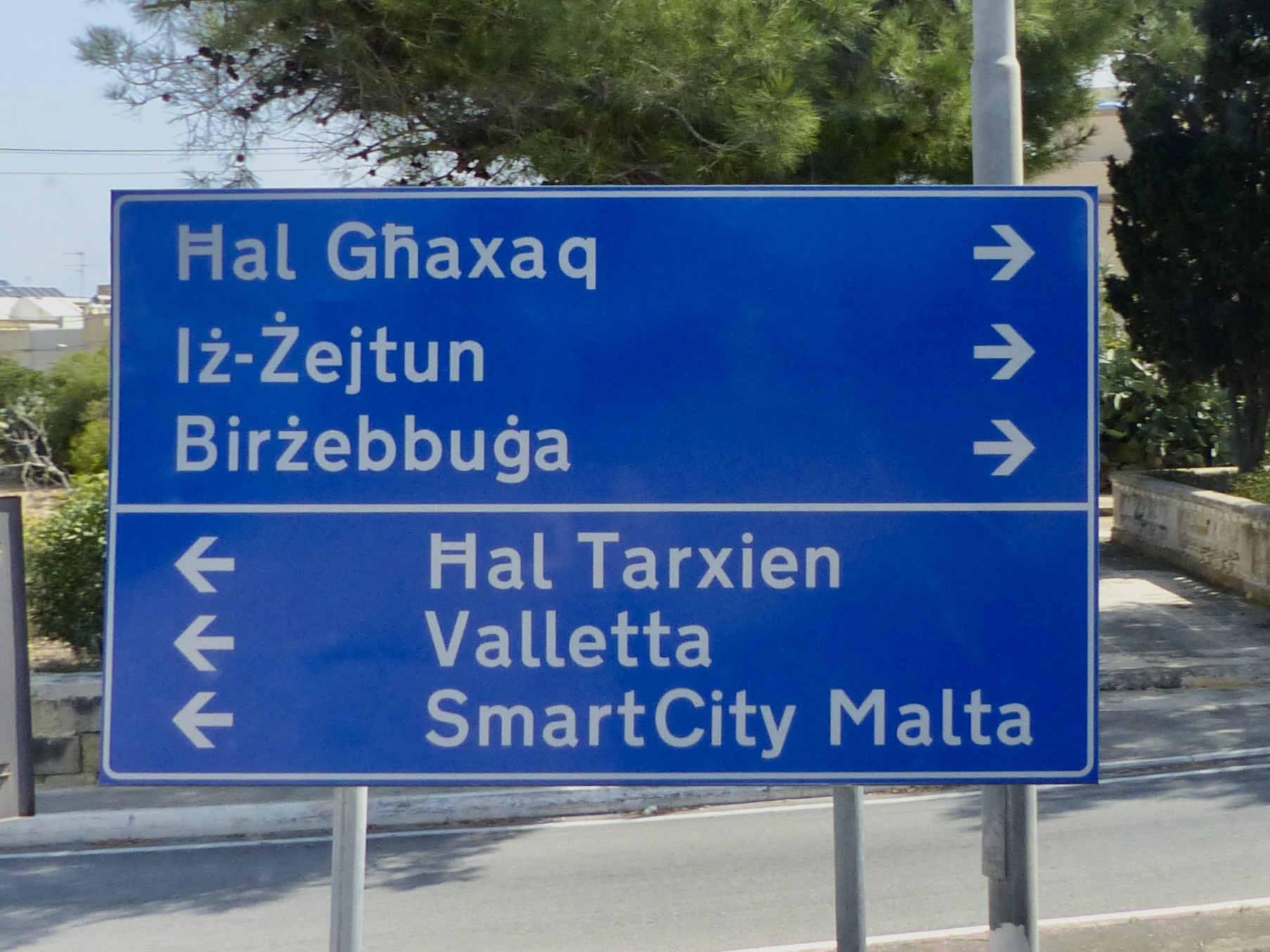
An example of a road sign in Malta, showing the typeface as adapted to characters specific to the Maltese alphabet

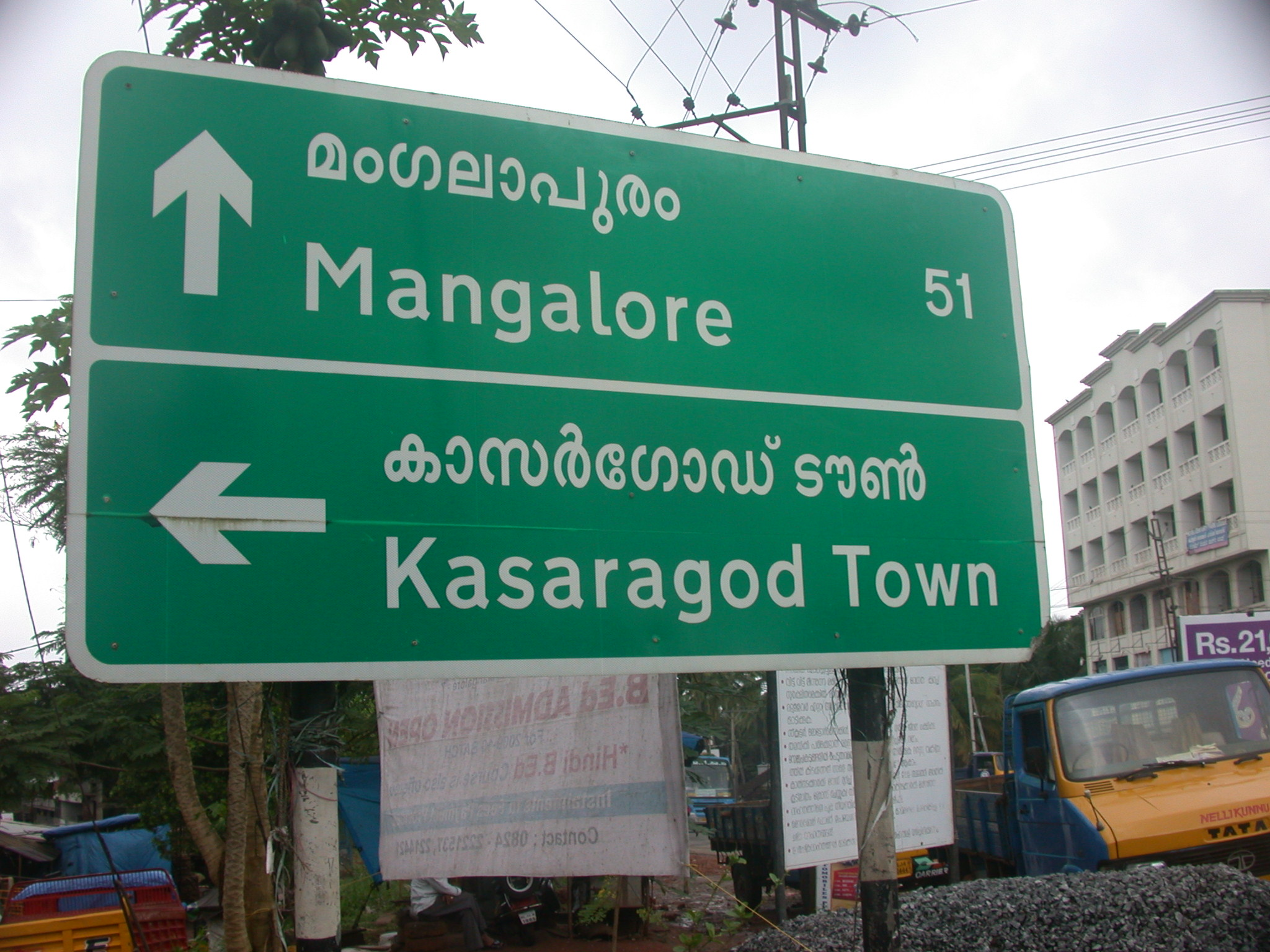
Use of the Transport font in Kerala, India in both Malayalam and English

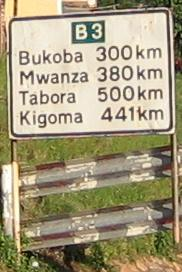
The Transport font is used in several ex-British colonies, such as this one in Kagera Region, Tanzania

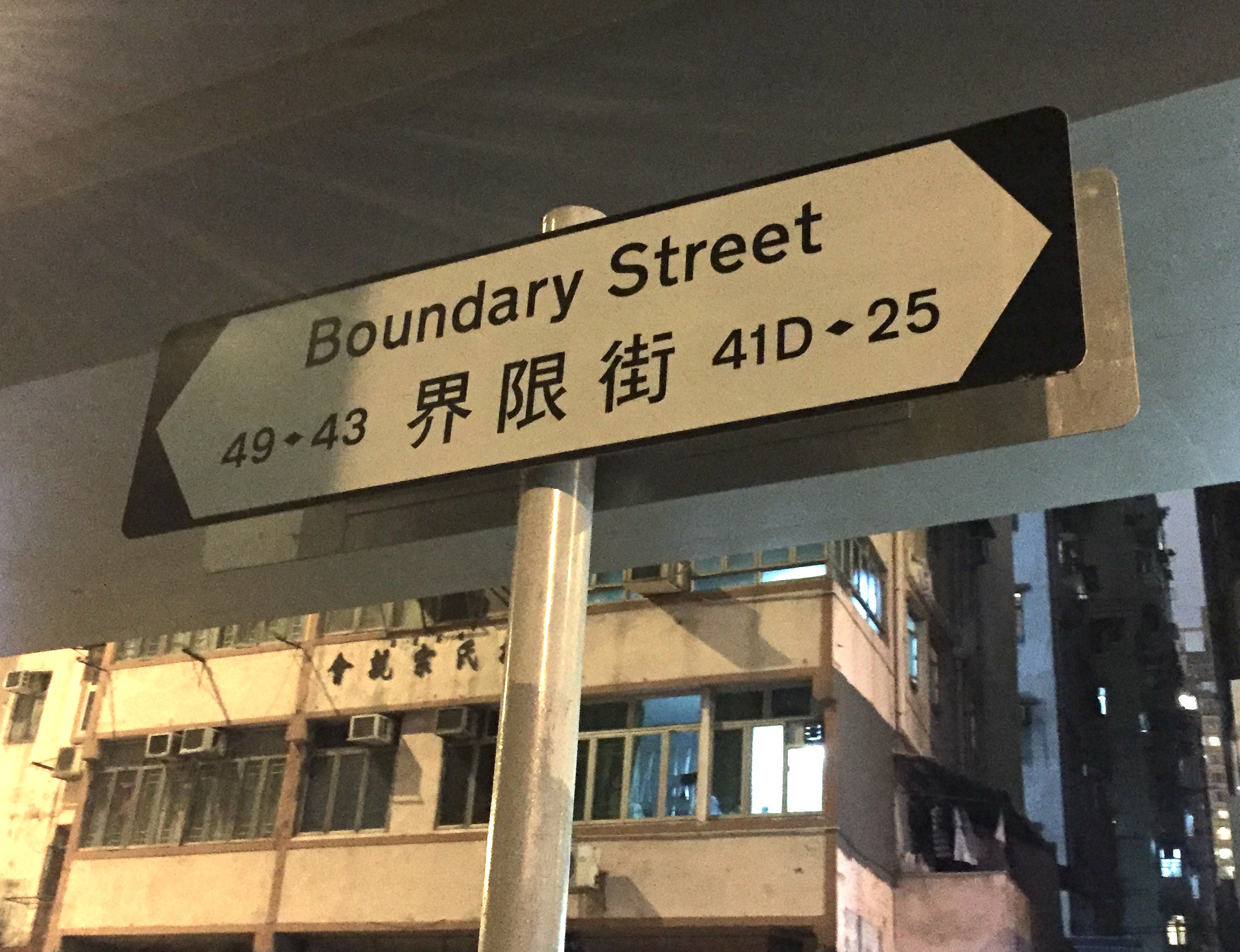
Latest street direction sign with Transport typeface in Mongkok, Hong Kong

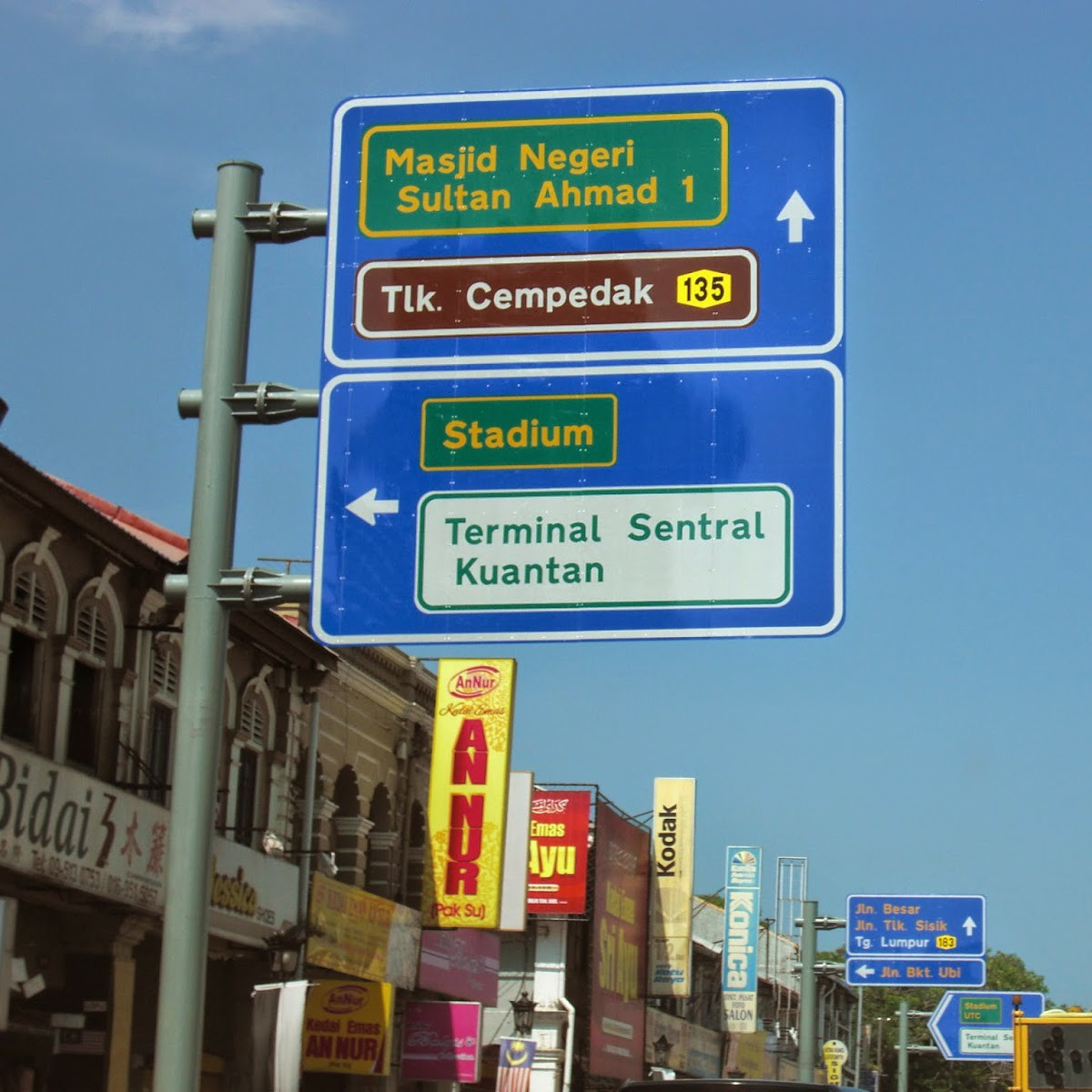
Gantry road sign with Transport typeface used in Malaysia

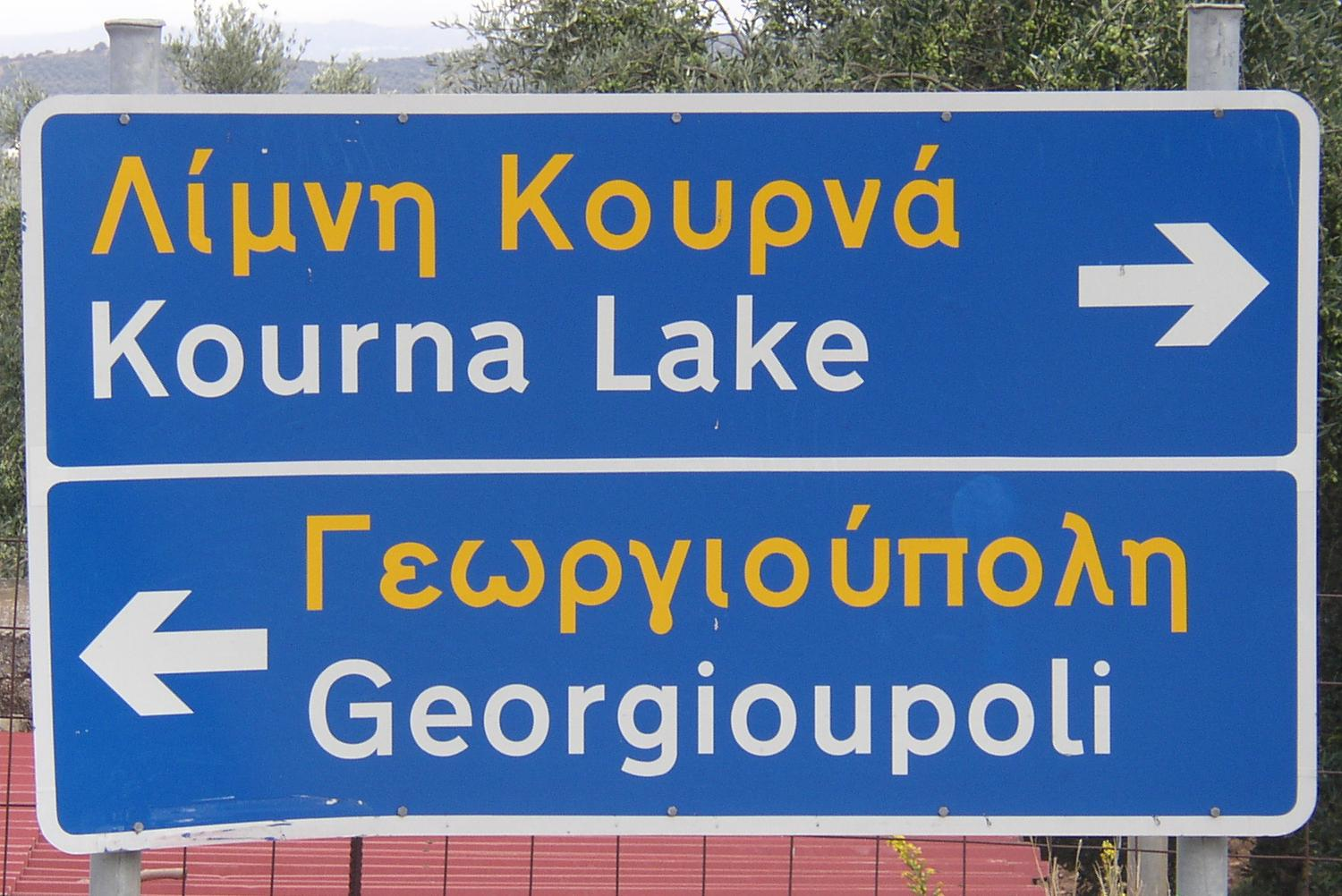
Use of the typeface in Greece

== See also ==
- Motorway (typeface) — Another font used for motorway route numbers on motorways, also designed by Kinneir & Calvert.
- Rail Alphabet — The equivalent font on Britain's railways, also designed by Kinneir & Calvert.
- Johnston (typeface) — The London Underground font, designed by Edward Johnston.
- Public signage typefaces
- Highway Gothic — The North American equivalent that is also used widely around the world for traffic signs.
- DIN 1451 — The German equivalent.
