= British Rail Corporate Identity Manual =

Corporate identity guide

- Front cover
- Author: British Rail
- Language: English
- Publication date: 1965
- Publication place: United Kingdom

The British Rail Corporate Identity Manual is a corporate identity guide created in 1965 by British Rail. It was conceived in 1964, and finished in July 1965 by British Rail's Design Research Unit, and introduced British Rail's enduring double arrow logo, created by Gerald Barney and still in use today as the logo for National Rail. The manual spanned four volumes, and was created as part of a comprehensive redesign of British Rail following the Beeching Cuts as part of a plan to attract more passengers. It is noted as a piece of British design history.

== History ==
The first volume, published in July 1965, introduced Rail Blue, a standardised colour for use of rolling stock liveries and the total adoption of Rail Alphabet, a typeface designed by Jock Kinneir and Margaret Calvert, for use across the British Rail network. It was exhibited at the Design Council, London in the same year. The second volume was published in November 1966, contained guidance on printed publicity such as posters and regional logos. The third and fourth volumes, issued in 1970, focused on the non-rail sectors of British Rail, including architecture, and new branding for Sealink.

In 2016, the manual raised £55,102 for a reprint, combining the four volumes into one book.
