= British Rail Double Arrow =

Logo used by British Rail and successor organisations

The British Rail "Double Arrow" designed by Gerry Barney (1965)

The British Rail Double Arrow is a logo that was created for British Rail (BR), the then state-owned operator of Britain's railway network, in 1965. It remained in use as part of the National Rail brand used for Britain's passenger rail services after the disbanding of British Rail, having been officially renamed as the National Rail Double Arrow and more recently being updated and reworked for continued use under the name Rail Symbol 2. In 2025, the logo was adopted by Great British Railways, the spiritual successor to British Rail.

== Origins ==
The logo grew out of a desire for modernisation in the 1960s, with the management of what was then known as British Railways wanting to divest the organisation of older motifs and develop a corporate identity to rival that of London Transport. BR's design panel set up a working party led by Milner Gray of the Design Research Unit. They drew up a Corporate Identity Manual which established a coherent brand and design standard for the whole organisation, specifying Rail Blue and pearl grey as the standard colour scheme for all rolling stock; Rail Alphabet as the standard corporate typeface, designed by Jock Kinneir and Margaret Calvert; and introducing the now-iconic corporate identity symbol of the "Double Arrow" logo. Designed by Gerry Barney (also of the DRU), this arrow device was formed of two interlocked arrows across two parallel lines, symbolising a double track railway. The new BR corporate identity and Double Arrow were introduced to the public in December 1964, and rolled out at the start of January 1965, as the brand name of the organisation was truncated to "British Rail".

The logo was used widely by British Rail on trains, stations and tickets. It was also used by subsidiary companies, most notably on the funnels of Sealink ferries, where the standard image was used on the port side side, but a mirror image on the starboard side so that the top arrow always pointed to the bow of the ship. On flags, too, the logo appeared in reverse on the back with the top arrow pointing towards the flagpole.

== Post-privatisation use ==
With the privatisation of the railways in the mid-1990s, the trademark registration for the logo was transferred to the Secretary of State for Transport. As British railway trains are now operated by a number of independent train operating companies, the double arrow logo no longer appears on railway vehicles except those preserved. However it still appears on railway tickets, which can usually be used on the services of a variety of train operators, and is used to denote stations within the National Rail network.

As such it is still printed on railway tickets and used to denote railway stations, including usage on street signs pointing to such stations. The logo has traditionally been used in a variety of colours, and in both positive and reversed forms.

== Rail Symbol 2 ==
The Great British Railways logo

In September 2022 specifications for an updated version of the logo were released by Network Rail, the body responsible for Britain's national railway infrastructure.

Created with the input of graphic designer Nick Job and the Design Council, the revised design appears almost identical to the original but incorporates several adjustments to improve the utility of the logo, including:

- Replacement of dark and light variants with a single version
- Minor widening of the symbol to give a more practical aspect ratio
- Slight adjustment to diagonal arms to improve performance at small sizes

The new guidance also details the colours the logo may be reproduced in and specifies how the logo should be used on items such as station signage and flags.

It was announced in December 2025 that the logo would be used on the livery of Great British Railways (GBR) trains. The first trains to contain the logo on the new livery were unveiled in May 2026.
