= Motorway (typeface) =

Sans-serif typeface

- Category: Sans-serif
- Designers: Jock Kinneir; Margaret Calvert
- Date created: 1958 (Original, limited alphabet); 2015 (Unofficial full alphabet, K-type)
- Sample

Motorway is a sans-serif typeface designed by Jock Kinneir and Margaret Calvert for use on the motorway network of the United Kingdom. Motorway was first used on the Preston Bypass (which subsequently became part of the M6) in 1958, and has been in use on the UK's motorways ever since. The typeface is also used in some other countries, most notably Ireland and Portugal.

Motorway Permanent full character set

Motorway Temporary full character set

Motorway comes in two weights, "Motorway Permanent" and "Motorway Temporary". Motorway Permanent is the standard weight, and is used for pale text on a dark background (for example, on white-on-blue permanent motorway signs) while Motorway Temporary is heavier, and is used for dark text on a pale background (for example, black-on-yellow temporary motorway signs). The typefaces have a limited character set, only containing the numbers 0 to 9; the letters "A", "B", "E", "M", "N", "S", "W", "NE", "SE", "NW", "SW"; parentheses; a comma; an ampersand; and the word "Toll" (treated as a single character). The character "Toll" was added to the font set in summer 2007, in order to be added to any following new M6 Toll road signs on the motorway. Previously the word "Toll" was written in Transport Medium adjacent to "M6" written in Motorway Permanent.

A full character set of the Motorway typeface was completed by the K-Type foundry in 2015, almost sixty years after its inception. The family includes the Bold (Temporary) weight, the SemiBold (Permanent) weight, and a previously unconsidered Regular (book) weight. There are also true italics for each weight.

== Use in the UK ==
The Motorway alphabet appears on road signs on motorways in the United Kingdom, and is used for route numbers. On non-motorway roads at interchanges, the Motorway typeface may only be used on signs pointing in a direction where a driver would become immediately subject to motorway regulations. All other text on UK road signs appears in Transport.

== Use in Ireland ==
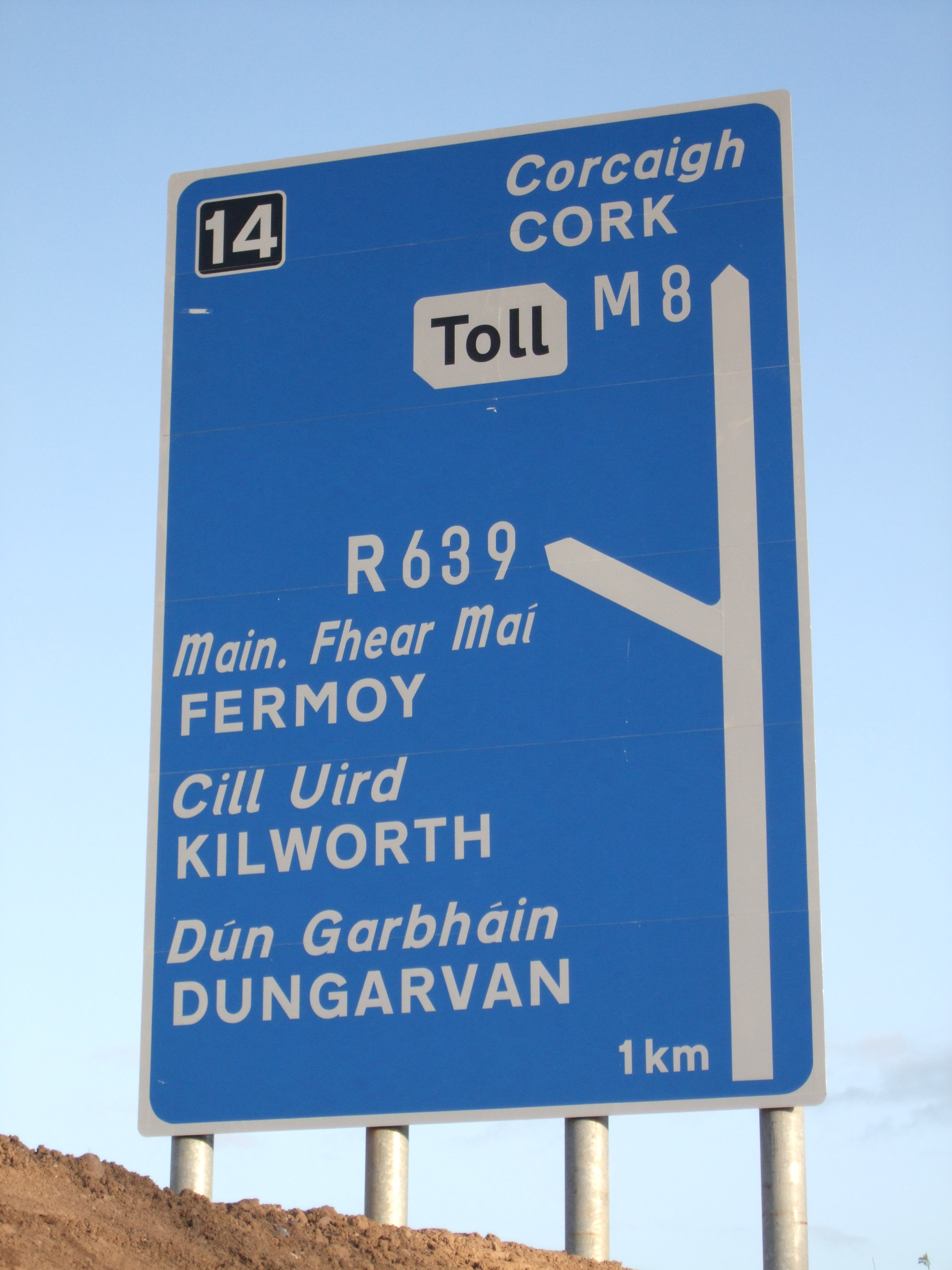
Motorway font in use on a directional sign on an Irish motorway. Note the "R" of "R639" in Transport font.

The Motorway font is also used in Ireland. Its use is slightly different from that in the UK – in the Republic, motorway route numbers are always in Motorway font, whether the sign is on a motorway or not. In addition, on signs erected before 2009, route numbers for all-purpose roads on motorway signs were in Transport font. On signs erected since 2009, all route numbers on motorways are now in Motorway font, bringing Ireland closer to the UK practice (however, as Motorway font has not previously featured the letters "N", "R" and "L", these letters still appear in Transport). As in the UK, all other text on road signs appears in Transport font.

Speed limit signs in Ireland since 2005 have used the modified number glyphs of Motorway, in that they are thinner in weight, and the 30 km/h sign makes use of a special flat-top three glyph.

== Use in Portugal ==
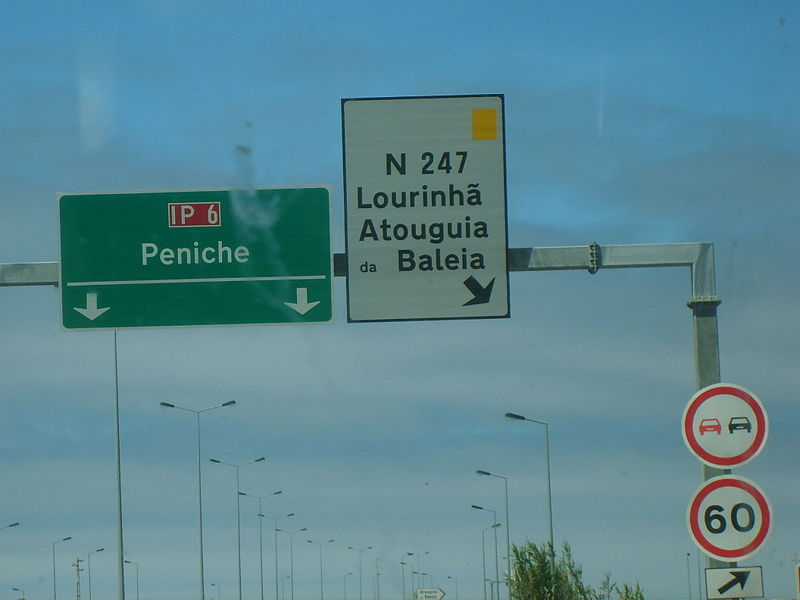
Motorway font in use on a Portuguese main route, specifically for the numerals

The Motorway font is used in Portugal for numerals in route numbers as well as exit numbers.

== See also ==
- List of public signage typefaces
- Transport (typeface)
- Rail Alphabet – The equivalent font on Britain's railways, also designed by Kinneir & Calvert.
- Johnston (typeface) – The London Underground font, designed by Edward Johnston.
- Public signage typefaces
- Highway Gothic – A font also used widely around the world for traffic signs.
- SNV (typeface)
- DIN 1451 – The German equivalent.
