= National Rail =

Passenger rail brand in Great Britain

- Product type: Public transport
- Current owner: Rail Delivery Group
- Country: United Kingdom (Great Britain only)
- Introduced: 1999; 27 years ago
- Related brands: National Rail Enquiries; British Rail
- Markets: Great Britain
- Website: nationalrail.co.uk

National Rail (NR) is the trading name licensed for use by the Rail Delivery Group, a group representing passenger train operating companies (TOCs) of England, Scotland, and Wales, operating on the rail system of Great Britain.

The British Railways Board ran passenger services using the brand name British Rail from 1965 until 1997, when it was privatised and services were transferred to private train operating companies. Rail transport in Northern Ireland operates under a different system.

National Rail's main activities are ticketing and the operation of the National Rail website (previously National Rail Enquiries) and mobile app. Most tickets are inter-available between the services of all operators. The website and app provide live service timings, and a journey planner which provides the times and fares for a given journey; after selecting a fare, the purchase is completed at the relevant train operating company's website or app.

== National Rail and Network Rail ==
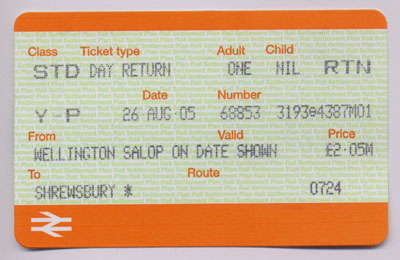
Young person's railcard rail ticket from Wellington to Shrewsbury

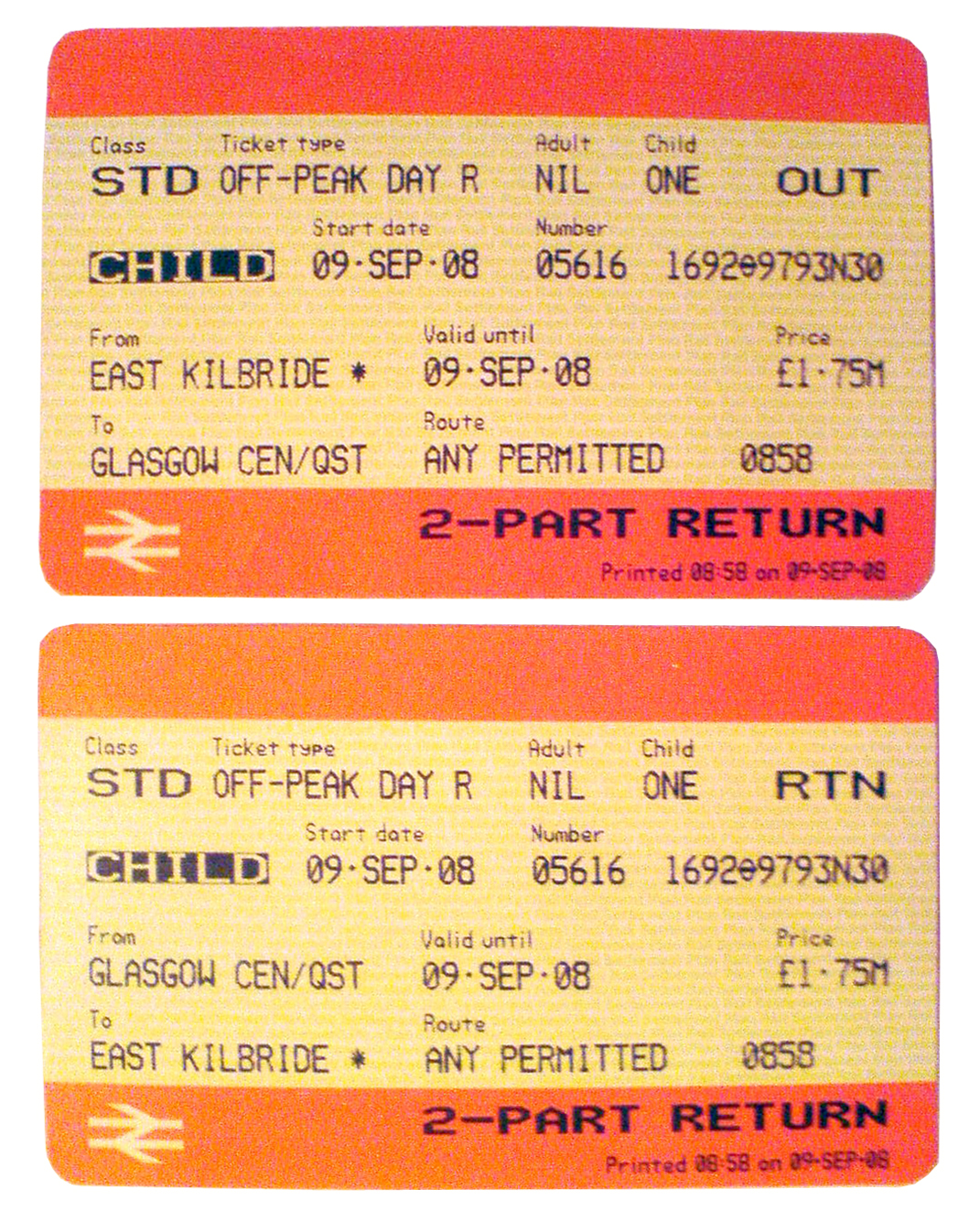
Child return ticket from East Kilbride to Glasgow

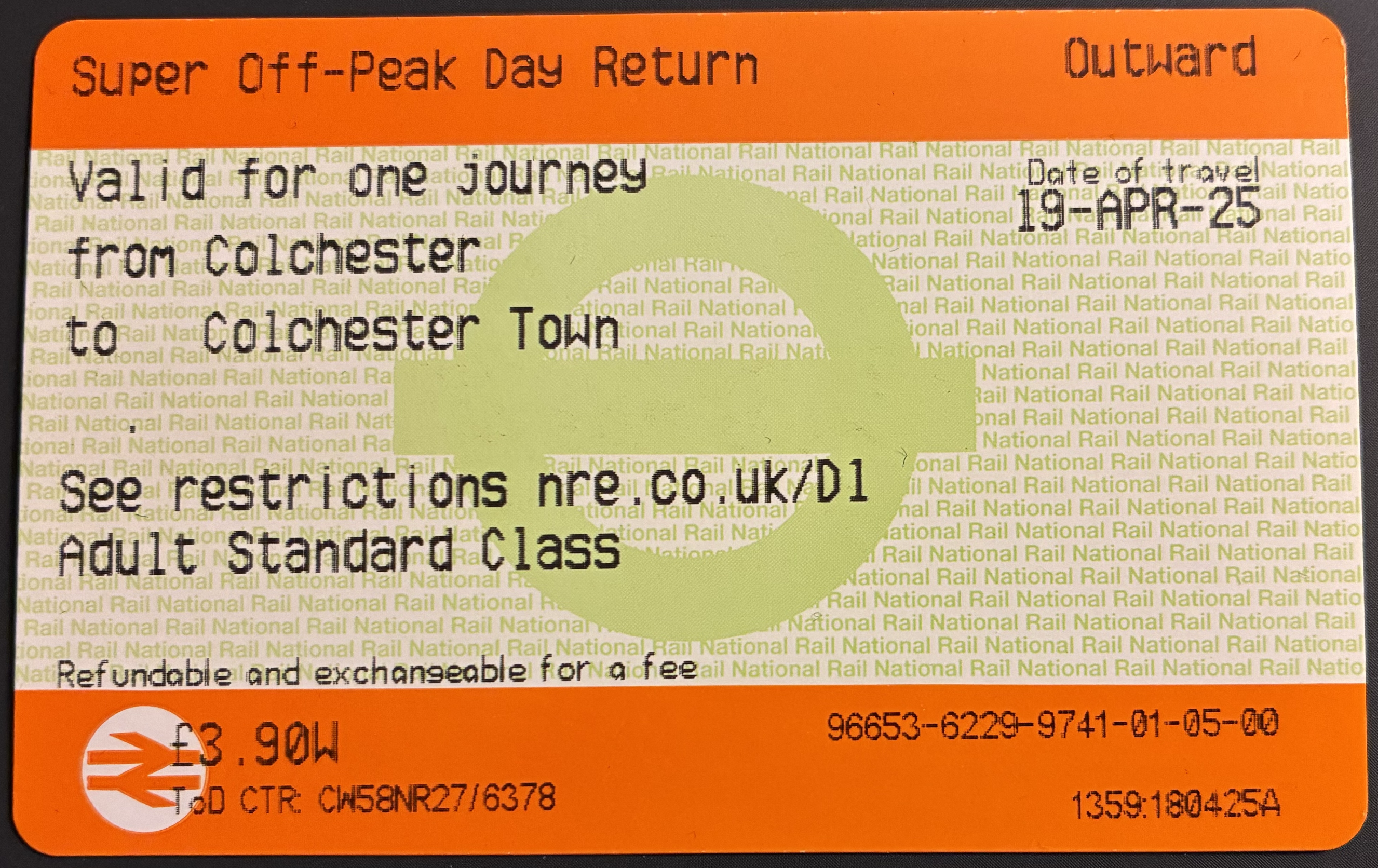
Outward portion of a return ticket between Colchester and Colchester Town printed in the post-2014 layout on a TfL ticket stock

National Rail should not be confused with Network Rail. National Rail is a brand used to promote passenger railway services, and providing some harmonisation for passengers in ticketing, while Network Rail is the organisation which owns and manages most of the fixed assets of the railway network, including tracks, stations and signals.

The two generally coincide where passenger services are run. Most major Network Rail lines also carry freight traffic and some lines are freight-only. There are some scheduled passenger services on privately managed, non-Network Rail lines, for example Chiltern Railways which runs on both Network Rail track and tracks owned by London Underground. Although London Underground uses its own tracks in the majority of its network, it also runs on Network Rail tracks.

== Train operating companies (TOCs) ==
Twenty-five privately owned train operating companies were each franchised for a defined term by government in 1996–97. They operated passenger trains in Great Britain. However, franchises have ceased to exist and are being replaced by operating contracts, which do not involve significant commercial risk for the operators. The Rail Delivery Group is the trade association representing the TOCs, which includes both franchised and open access operators, and provides core services, including the provision of the National Rail Enquiries service. It also runs Rail Settlement Plan, which formerly allocated ticket revenue to the various TOCs, and Rail Staff Travel, which manages travel facilities for railway staff. It does not compile the national timetable, which is the joint responsibility of the Office of Rail and Road (allocation of paths) and Network Rail (timetable production and publication). Since March 2020 all ticket revenue has been collected by the Department for Transport, which also pays the operators' costs.

== Design and marketing ==
Following the privatisation of British Rail there was no longer a single approach to railway corporate design. The look and feel of signage, liveries and marketing material was largely the preserve of the individual TOCs. However, railway reforms which are currently in progress will restore the pre-privatisation position, with design responsibilities for the whole network resting with the new 'guiding mind', Great British Railways.

However, National Rail continues to use BR's double-arrow symbol, designed by Gerald Burney of the Design Research Unit. It has been incorporated in the National Rail logotype and is displayed on tickets, the National Rail website and other publicity. The trademark rights to the double arrow symbol remain state-owned, being vested in the Secretary of State for Transport.

The double arrow symbol is also a generic symbol for a railway station across Great Britain, and is used to indicate a railway station on British traffic signs.

== Corporate identity ==
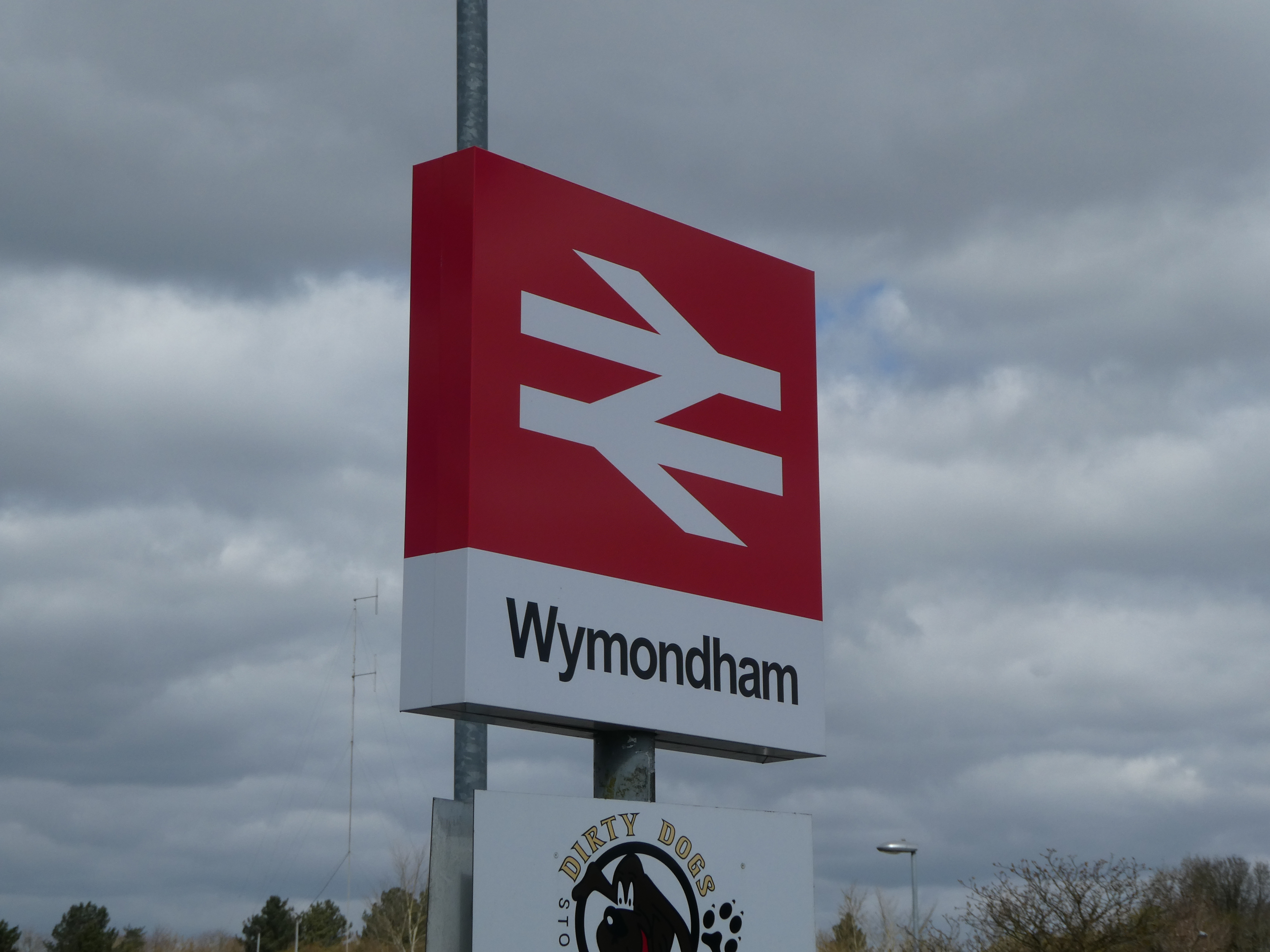
The train station sign at Wymondham, with the double arrow, the corporate identity of National Rail

The National Rail (NR) logo was introduced by ATOC in 1999 (previously the British Rail logo as used from 1965), and was used on the Great Britain public timetable for the first time in the edition valid from 26 September in that year. Rules for its use are set out in the Corporate Identity Style Guidelines published by the Rail Delivery Group, available on its website. "In 1964 the Design Research Unit—Britain's first multi-disciplinary design agency founded in 1943 by Misha Black, Milner Gray and Herbert Read—was commissioned to breathe new life into the nation's neglected railway industry". The NR title is sometimes described as a "brand". As it was used by British Rail, the single operator before franchising, its use also maintains continuity and public familiarity; and it avoids the need to replace signage.

The lettering used in the National Rail logotype is a modified form of the typeface Sassoon Bold. Some train operating companies continue to use the former British Rail Rail Alphabet lettering to varying degrees in station signage, although its use is no longer universal; however it remains compulsory (under Railway Group Standards) for safety signage in trackside areas and is still common (although not universal) on rolling stock.

The British Rail typefaces of choice from 1965 were Helvetica and Univers, with others (particularly Frutiger) coming into use during the sectorisation period after 1983. TOCs may use what they like: examples include Futura (Stagecoach Group), Helvetica (FirstGroup and National Express), Johnston (London Overground and Elizabeth line), Frutiger (Arriva Trains Wales), Bliss (CrossCountry), and a modified version of Precious by London Midland.

== Other passenger rail operators in Great Britain ==
Several conurbations have their own metro or tram systems, most of which are not part of National Rail. These include the London Underground, Docklands Light Railway, London Tramlink, Blackpool Tramway, Glasgow Subway, Tyne and Wear Metro, Manchester Metrolink, Sheffield Supertram, West Midlands Metro and Nottingham Express Transit. On the other hand, the largely self-contained Merseyrail system is part of the National Rail network, and urban rail networks around Birmingham, Cardiff, Glasgow and West Yorkshire consist entirely of National Rail services.

London Overground and the Elizabeth line (formerly TfL Rail) are hybrids: Their services are operated via a concession awarded by Transport for London (TfL). They are part of National Rail as train operating companies, where tickets can be used in the same way as other operators, and shown in the National Rail timetable. However, under Transport for London, they are considered as separate networks. They are listed separately in all materials produced by TfL than National Rail, stations serving London Overground or the Elizabeth line only do not have the National Rail logo shown on either the station themselves or the tube map, and fares on these two networks are priced as TfL services, the same as London Underground, rather than National Rail services. The National Rail service status web page by TfL also does not list these two systems.

London Overground also owns some infrastructure in its own right, following the reopening of the former London Underground East London line and the extension to Barking Riverside.

Eurostar is also not part of the National Rail network despite sharing of tracks and stations (along High Speed 1). Northern Ireland Railways were never part of British Rail, which was limited to England, Scotland and Wales.

There are many privately owned or heritage railways in Great Britain which are not part of the National Rail network and mostly operate for heritage or pleasure purposes rather than as public transport, but some have connections to National Rail track.

== Ticketing ==
National Rail services have a common ticketing structure inherited from British Rail. Through tickets are available between any pair of stations on the network, and can be bought from any station ticket office. Most tickets are inter-available between the services of all operators on routes appropriate to the journey being made. Operators on some routes offer operator-specific tickets that are cheaper than the inter-available ones.

Through tickets involving London Underground, or to some ferry services (RailSail tickets) are also available. Oyster pay-as-you-go can be used on National Rail in Greater London from 2 January 2010. These same areas can also be journeyed to using a contactless debit/credit card. Contactless also covers some areas that Oyster does not, such as the Elizabeth line to Reading, or the Thameslink station at Oakleigh Park.

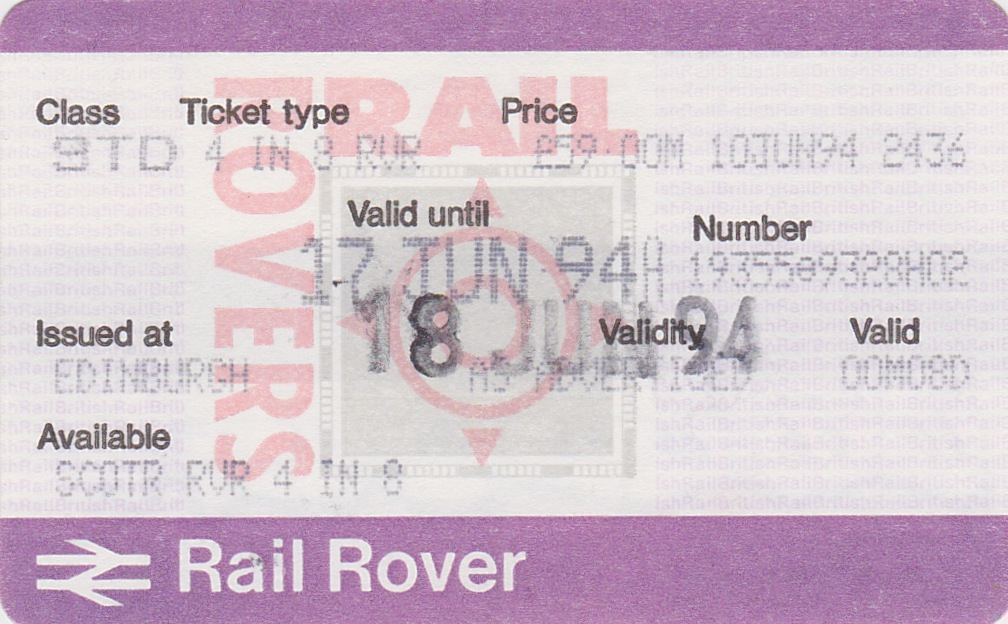
4 day rail rover (1994)

The most common types of tickets available include 'advance' tickets, that specify a specific route and timing between two destinations, 'off-peak' tickets, either as a single or a return, that allow a passenger to use a train at hours where the service is not busy, and 'anytime' tickets, which can be used on any train. Season tickets, which offer unlimited travel between two stations for a specified period, are also available. A 'rover' travel card ticket also exists that allows unlimited travel in a set area or on services of certain operators, for a certain period of time. Rovers which allow unlimited travel for only one day are sometimes referred to as ranger tickets, and are usually available for smaller areas.

Passengers without a valid ticket boarding a train at a station where ticket-buying facilities are available are required to pay the full Open Single or Return fare. On some services penalty fares apply – a ticketless passenger may be charged the greater of £20 or twice the full single fare to the next stop. Penalty Fares can be collected only by authorised Revenue Protection Inspectors, not by ordinary Guards.

National Rail distributes a number of technical manuals on which travel on the railways in Great Britain is based, such as the National Rail Conditions of Travel, via their website.

== Timetables ==
Pocket timetables for individual operators or routes are available free at staffed stations. The last official printed timetable with up to 3000 pages was published in 2007. Now the only complete print edition is published by Middleton Press (as of October 2016). A digital version of the full timetable is available as a PDF file without charge on the Network Rail website; however, passengers are recommended to obtain their timetables from the individual train companies.

== National Rail website ==
The National Rail website, previously called National Rail Enquiries, handles an average of 2.5 million journey planning enquiries every weekday through its website, apps and contact centre, and through information services supplied to third parties (such as open access data feeds).

It is Britain's largest and most accurate travel information website, peaking at more than 10 million visitors per day, more than its nearest competitors. It is considered the official authority for rail travel in Britain and regularly cited by the BBC and other large media outlets. Some train companies are not linked to for commercial reasons such as the Caledonian Sleeper but it cites National Rail's website as "the best place to find information on any temporary limits on accessibility".

The National Rail website includes a journey planner, fare and live departure information. The site is designed to complement the myriad different websites of Britain's privatised rail companies, so when users have selected which tickets they wish to buy, they are redirected to the most relevant train company website, where they can buy their tickets without booking fees.

In 2012 the website was joined by a mobile app mirroring its functionality. The app is available for iPhone and Android.

In June 2020, a real time personalised messaging service, Alert Me, was launched, providing real-time disruption and crowding information via Messenger. This was followed in September 2021 by a similar service made available through WhatsApp. The service was closed in June 2023 leaving only a simple SMS based messaging service in place for customers. Both services were provided by a British transport technology company Zipabout.

In April 2021 the National Rail website turned from colour to greyscale in a tribute to Prince Philip, Duke of Edinburgh, who had recently died. The gesture however backfired after users highlighted accessibility issues and complained they could no longer use the website. The website was quickly reverted back to its original design the same day following customer accessibility feedback.

In July 2021 the Department of Transport published the world’s first 'greenprint' to decarbonise all modes of domestic transport by 2050 in the UK. It was published two months before the climate summit COP26, and planned to provide a world-leading 'greenprint' to cut emissions from "seas and skies, roads and railways". The nationalrail.co.uk website also signed up to the same carbon commitment, which was referred to as 'The Green Travel Pledge' and was cited on its website and via Rail Delivery Group media.

In June 2023 the website was completely overhauled with an entirely new frontend retaining little of the old designs but the brand logo remained. The website is quoted as saying its website is, "cleaner, more modern, and full of better information". In addition, its original mobile website which was a sub-domain (m.nationalrail.co.uk now redirects) was switched off.

Earlier in 2024 National Rail's digital journey planner was also switched off and redirected to the new version. Online Journey Planner (OJP) was the engine used to plan routes, calculate fares and establish ticket availability. The OJP accesses real-time information directly from Darwin, meaning all journey plans take account of delays, schedule changes and train cancellations. The OJP data feed APIs are available for use under licence. Darwin is the data system that powers all the real-time information which customers use to check the status of train journeys. In 2024 Darwin celebrated its 20th anniversary.

National Rail also publishes route and destination pages on its website (e.g. “trains to Glasgow” or “london to manchester”), which provide travel information, journey planning tools and links to purchase rail tickets for journeys across Great Britain. These pages combine route and destination information with access to fares and booking options through the National Rail journey planner. One of these pages was cited in a BBC travel article about the best slow train journey in Britain by train expert Tom Chesshyre in 2025.

== Future ==
Under the plans (Bill 325 2024-26) laid out in the current parliament underpinning the creation of Great British Railways (GBR), the Labour government intends to consolidate many of the existing rail industry bodies into the new organisation, with their roles carried out under the GBR banner.

== See also ==
- Great British Railways
- Rail Accident Investigation Branch
- Rail transport in the United Kingdom
- Railcard
