= NR Brunel =

Humanist sans-serif typeface

- Category: Sans-serif
- Designer(s): The Foundry
- Commissioned by: Railtrack; Network Rail
- Date released: 2000s
- Characters: 210
- License: Proprietary
- Trademark: Network Rail
- Sample
- Shown here: NR Brunel - Regular weight

The NR Brunel typeface is the Network Rail standard for signing at Network Rail managed stations.

This font is an evolution of the Brunel typeface designed by a specialist typeface design company, The Foundry, for Railtrack in 1999 and adopted initially by Network Rail.

It was recommended as a new national standard for station signs in a 2009 report commissioned by the Secretary of State for Transport, and was adopted by South West Trains and East Midlands Trains for their station signage.

Beginning in 2023, the typeface is due to be phased out as new rail operator Great British Railways reintroduces an updated version of Rail Alphabet as part of its systemwide rebranding.

The Brunel typeface is also used in Ireland for Iarnród Éireann station signage.

== See also ==
- Rail Alphabet
