= Milner Gray =

Milner Gray may refer to:

- Milner Gray (politician) (1871–1943), British politician
- Milner Gray (designer) (1899–1997), British industrial designer
