= Design Research Unit =

1943–2004 British design consultant firm

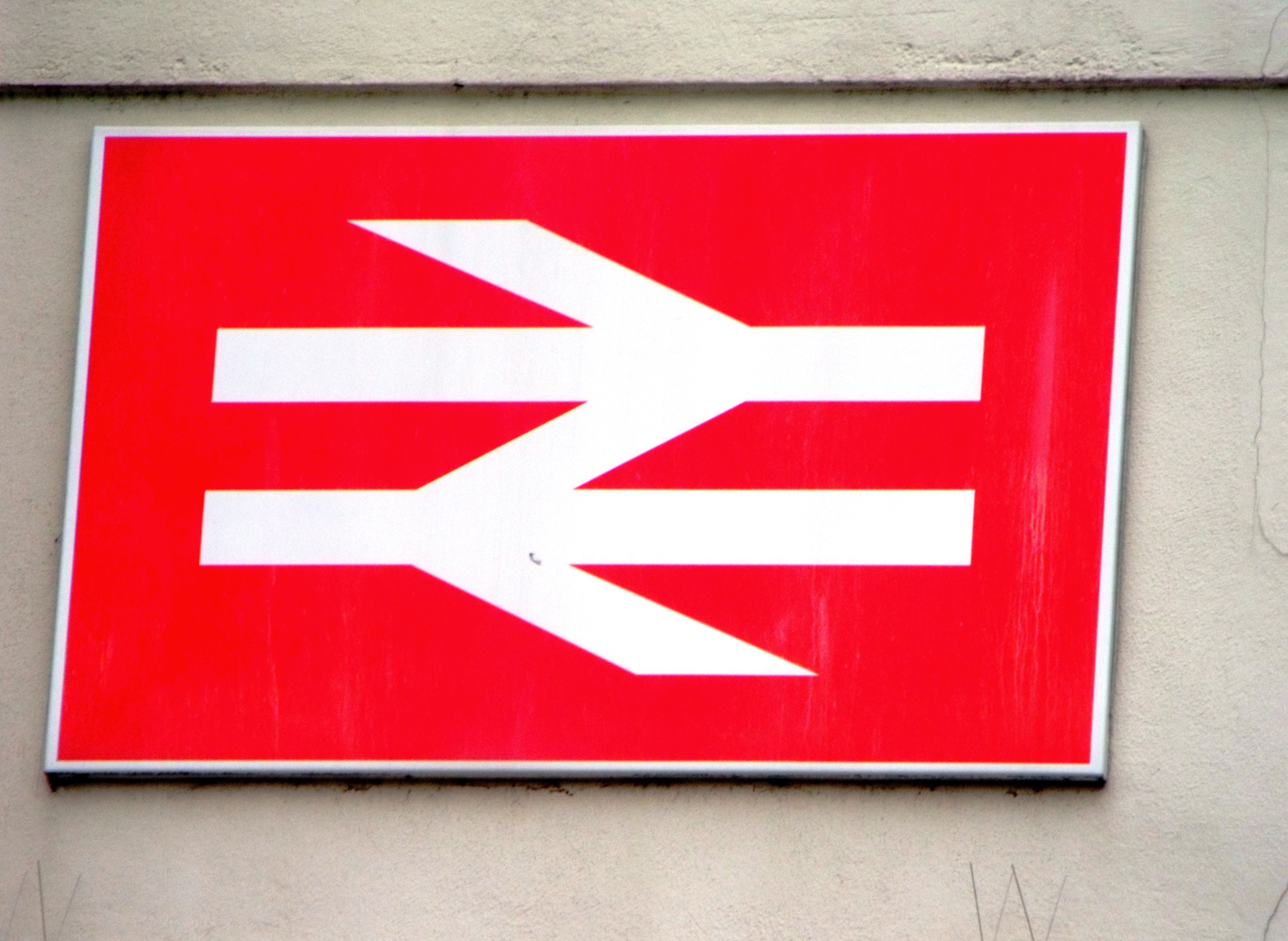
The British Rail Double Arrow designed by Gerry Barney of the DRU

The Design Research Unit (DRU) was one of the first generation of British design consultancies combining expertise in architecture, graphics and industrial design.

It was established in 1943 by the poet Herbert Read, architect Misha Black and graphic designer Milner Gray. It became well known for its work in relation to the Festival of Britain in 1951 and its influential corporate identity project for British Rail in 1965. In 2004, DRU merged with Scott Brownrigg architects.

== History ==
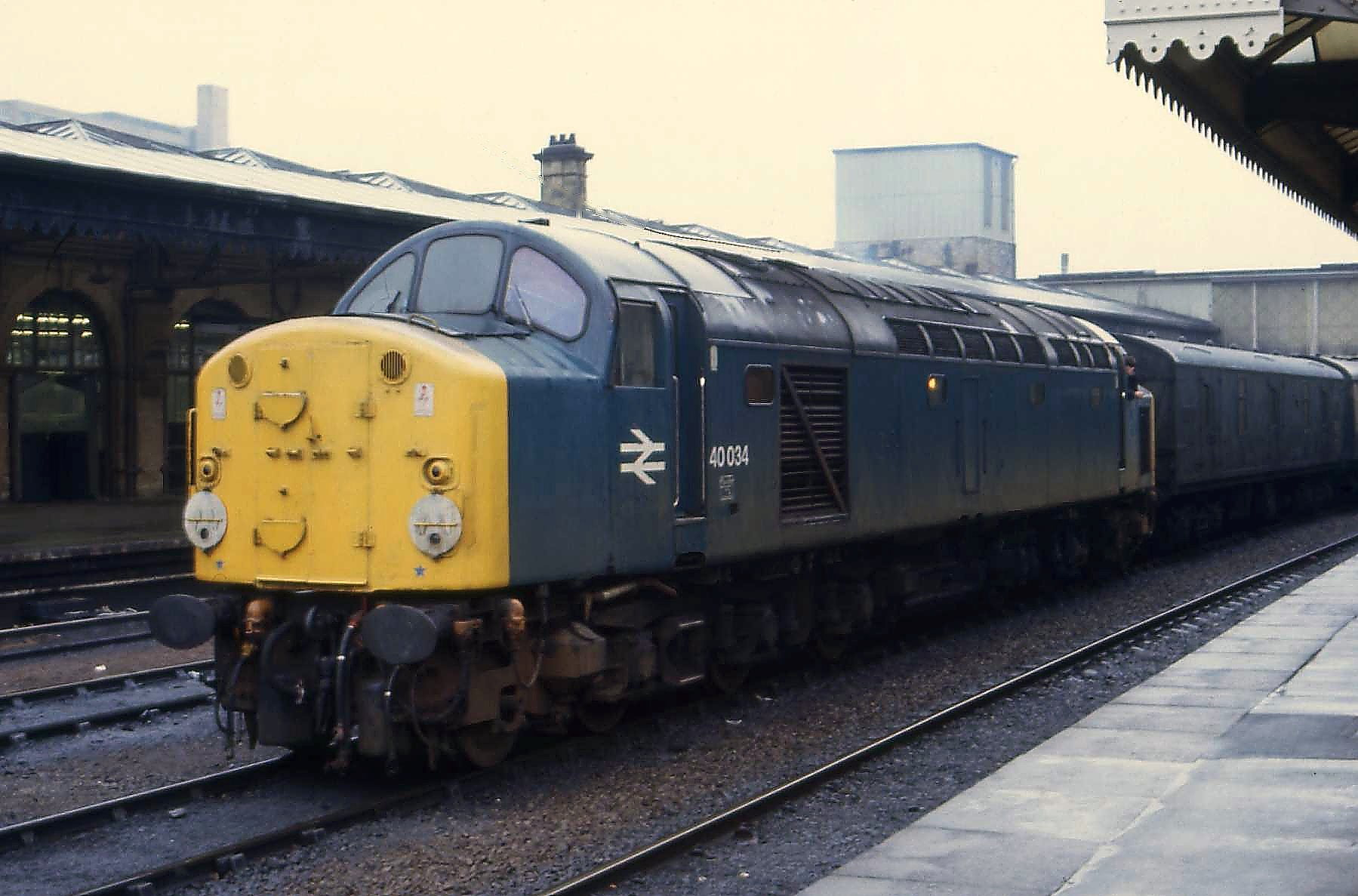
British Rail Class 40 locomotive, featuring the 1965 corporate branding by DRU

The DRU was formed in 1943 by several individuals, including the architect Misha Black, graphic designer Milner Gray, the poet and art critic Herbert Read, and advertising executive Marcus Brumwell. From the onset, its purpose was to bring art and industry together in a cohesive design for the benefit of all. An early set of notes proposed a "service equipped to advise on all problems of design", addressing the needs of "the State, Municipal Authorities, Industry or Commerce." They anticipated a post-war demand for technical expertise and a need for "the reconditioning and re-designing public utility services" recommending "contact... with the railway companies, motor coach lines and so on."

Herbert Read became the group's first member of staff, sharing offices in Kingsway with Mass-Observation, another initiative that Brumwell supported under the umbrella of the Advertising Services Guild. During 1944, Read was joined by the economist and writer Bernard Hollowood and, after an unsuccessful tour of factories across the Midlands, the group engaged the sculptor Naum Gabo to design a new car for the light vehicle manufacturer Jowett Cars. However, this contract was terminated by the company in 1945 after the design was claimed by Jowett to be 'radical but impractical'.

Black and Gray were initially committed to wartime roles within the Exhibitions Department for the Ministry of Information. Under their leadership, DRU made important postwar contributions to the Britain Can Make It exhibition (1946) and Festival of Britain (1951). At the invitation of the Council of Industrial Design (afterward Design Council), DRU designed the Quiz Machines that sought to gauge public taste at BCMI, as well as the highly didactic ‘What Industrial Design Means’ display (by Black, Bronek Katz, and R. Vaughan). This marked the beginning of a long association between the two bodies. For the Festival of Britain, they were the architects for the Regatta Restaurant and designed a series of displays for the Dome of Discovery.

While not the primary focus area of the group, it was responsible for the production of several noteworthy buildings, such as the mammal house at London Zoo and a rooftop extension to the DRU’s own building in Aybrook Street. Under Gray's direction, five 'architectural style groups' were created and used for the signage of numerous pubs across the UK. The signage promoted by the agency saw one of the earliest uses of pressure-formed plastic, which has since become commonplace on the British high-street.

The group would be particularly impactful to British Railways (BR) during the 1960s, which was vigorously seeking to modernise and restructure at this time; in particular, BR management wished to divest the organisation of anachronistic, heraldic motifs and develop a corporate identity to rival that of London Transport. Gray headed a working party that was established by BR's design panel; it drew up a Corporate Identity Manual which established a coherent brand and design standard for the whole organisation, specifying Rail Blue and pearl grey as the standard colour scheme for all rolling stock; Rail Alphabet as the standard corporate typeface, designed by Jock Kinneir and Margaret Calvert; and introducing the now-iconic corporate Identity Symbol of the Double Arrow logo. Designed by Gerald Barney (also of the DRU), this arrow device was formed of two interlocked arrows across two parallel lines, symbolising a double-track railway. It was likened to a bolt of lightning or barbed wire, and also acquired a nickname: "the arrow of indecision". A mirror image of the double arrow was used on the port side of BR-owned Sealink ferry funnels. The new BR corporate identity and double arrow were displayed at the Design Centre in London in early 1965, and the organisation's brand name was shortened to "British Rail".

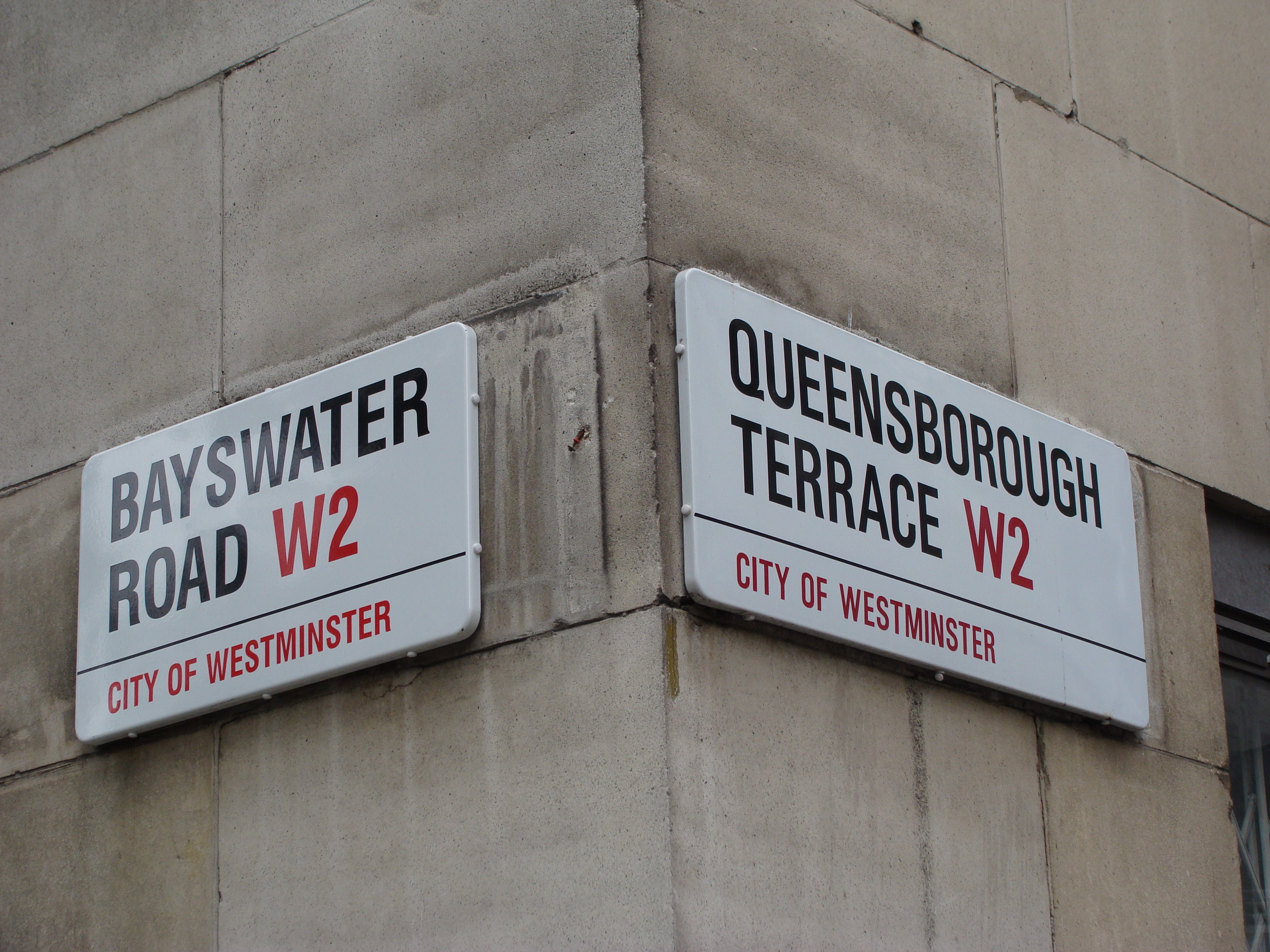
City of Westminster street name signs by Misha Black

Key DRU commissions included the 1954 Electricity Board Showrooms, by Black, Gibson, and H. Diamond, the British Overseas Airways Corporation engineering hall at Heathrow Airport by Black, Kenneth Bayes, and BOAC staff from 1951 to 1955, and a number of interiors for the P&O Orient Line's new liner Oriana by Black and Bayes in 1959. Other companies for whom DRU worked included Ilford, Courage, Watney Combe & Reid Dunlop, and London Transport. The 1968 City of Westminster street name signs by Misha Black (typography and implementation by Christopher Timings and Roger Bridgman) have become an integral part of London's streetscape.

Since that time, DRU worked for many high-profile companies, in interior design, graphic design and architecture. Projects of note include:

- Architectural design for: London Underground's Jubilee Line Extension works, Docklands Light Railway, Copenhagen Metro, Hong Kong Mass Transit Railway, Nottingham's guided bus system.
- Graphic design & wayfinding for: Network Rail, Lee Valley, Tarmac, ABC Television.

== Notable partners and associates ==
- Misha Black, 1943–77
- Marcus Brumwell, 1943–74
- Frederick Gibberd, 1945–46
- Milner Gray, joined 1943
- Jock Kinneir, 1949–56
- Herbert Read, 1943–68
- Richard Rogers, 1967–71
- Felix Samuely, 1945–46
- Sadie Speight, 1945–46
