= Walter Worboys =

ICI Executive

Sir Walter John Worboys
- Born: February 22, 1900; Perth, WA, Australia
- Died: March 17, 1969 (aged 69)
- Education: Scotch College
- Alma mater: University of Western Australia; Lincoln College, University of Oxford
- Occupations: businessman research chemist
- Employer(s): Brunner Mond & Co; ICI; Council of Industrial Design (1947-1960); Design Centre
- Known for: reforming road traffic signage, creator of the transport font
- Notable work: Worboys Committee; 1964 Traffic Signs Regulations
- Title: Rhodes Scholar; D.Phil. Sir
- Awards: Knighthood

Sir Walter John Worboys (22 February 1900 – 17 March 1969), was an Australian-born British businessman and chemist. He is best known for widely reforming road traffic signage in the United Kingdom.

== Biography ==
He was born in Perth, Western Australia, and educated at Scotch College and the University of Western Australia. Elected a Rhodes Scholar in 1922, he gained his D.Phil. after a further period of study at Lincoln College, Oxford. His first job was as a research chemist at Brunner Mond & Co. From there he moved to ICI, eventually reaching the rank of director.

In 1947 he joined the Council of Industrial Design, a body set up by the Board of Trade in 1944. He was chairman of the council from 1953 until 1960, during which time he set up the Design Centre, a permanent exhibition of the council’s work. The establishment of the Design Centre proved to be a turning point in the history of the council, which until that time had attracted more critics than friends.

In 1961 he was appointed to chair a committee to bring in a new era of modern road signage. The committee reported in 1963, advocating a total overhaul of the style of British road signs, introducing a new style that has lasted until the present day. The report recommended the pictorial design found on many European road signs, along with a British-designed font that was to become known as the Transport font.

Worboys died on 17 March 1969.
