= Great British Railways =

Planned British state-owned rail transport operator

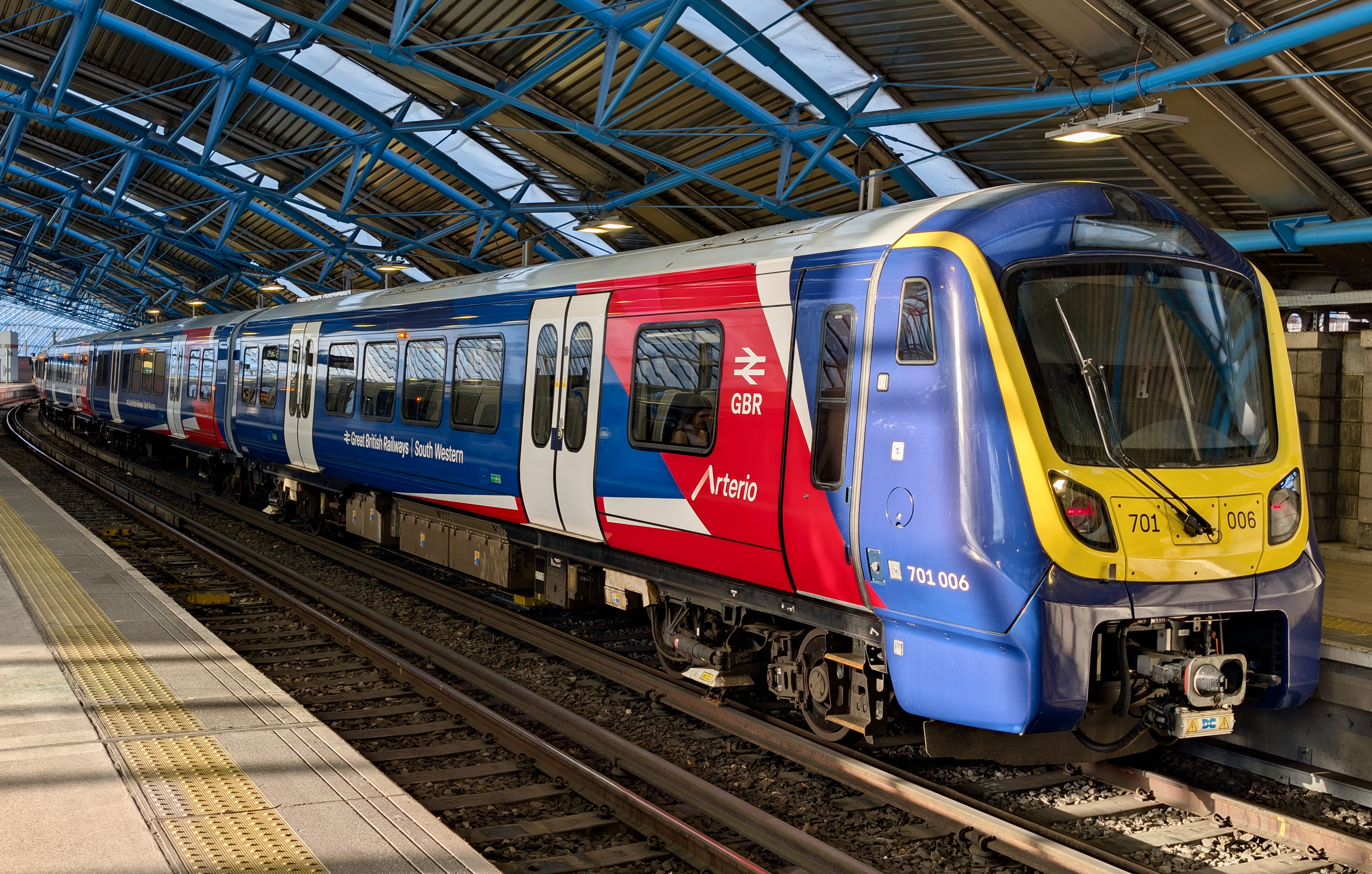
- A Class 701 at London Waterloo in GBR livery

Overview
- Main region: England
- Other regions: Scotland (cross-border); Wales (cross-border)
- Dates of operation: 2027 (planned)–
- Predecessors: Train operating companies: Avanti West Coast; c2c; Chiltern Railways; CrossCountry; East Midlands Railway; Great Western Railway; Greater Anglia; Greater Thameslink Railway; London North Eastern Railway; Northern Trains; Southeastern; South Western Railway; TransPennine Express; West Midlands Trains

Other
- Type: State-owned enterprise
- Industry: Railway transport, infrastructure and asset management
- Predecessor: Network Rail; Department for Transport (some functions); Rail Delivery Group (some functions); DfT Operator
- Headquarters: Derby, England
- Area served: Great Britain
- Key people: John Kingman (Chair)
- Products: Public transport
- Owner: HM Government; (Department for Transport)

Great British Railways (GBR) is a planned state-owned railway company that will operate most rail infrastructure and the majority of passenger rail services in Great Britain, alongside devolved and open-access operators.

It will be established with the passing of the forthcoming Railways Bill, as part of the Starmer government's plans not to renew the contracts of private train operating companies. It will absorb the functions of Network Rail (thus it will own and manage most railway infrastructure in Great Britain – stations, track and signalling), the Rail Delivery Group, the DfT Operator, parts of the Department for Transport (DfT), and each of the passenger service franchises as their contracts expire.

In 2024, the Secretary of State for Transport, Louise Haigh, set up a Shadow Great British Railways to prepare for the organisation's formal establishment. The chair of the shadow body is Laura Shoaf.

The Railways Bill, the legislation to establish Great British Railways, was introduced to Parliament in November 2025. The bill cleared the House of Commons in June 2026 and is expected to receive royal assent in late 2026, with GBR expected to become operational within 12 months.

The first GBR-branded trains were unveiled in May 2026, followed by the first branded station, Cambridge South, which opened in June of the same year.

== Funding and functions ==
Funding of GBR will follow the pattern established for Network Rail, with funding and deliverables determined every five years. For England and Wales, the Secretary of State (in consultation with Welsh Government ministers) will issue a high-level specification and a statement of funds available, and GBR will respond with a five-year business plan. This process will be mirrored in Scotland, where the Scottish Government commissions ScotRail and Caledonian Sleeper services and funds rail infrastructure.

Prior to GBR, the Office of Rail and Road (ORR) controlled Network Rail's funding and held that body to account for its performance. Proposals by the UK Government in February 2025 envisage reducing ORR's role to assessing GBR's business plans, monitoring major changes during the five-year cycle, and responding to appeals against GBR's decisions. The role of ORR in approving train operators' access to the network, and selling access rights, would be transferred to GBR.

GBR will be responsible for the operational delivery of the railways in the existing areas of Network Rail, i.e., England, Scotland and Wales. This will include passenger services; planning timetables; operation and maintenance of rolling stock; setting fares; and managing access to the network, including setting charges for existing and future open access operators. Outside the scope of GBR are Transport for London, Merseyrail, ScotRail, and Transport for Wales Rail, as well as light rail and tram services. GBR will not extend to Northern Ireland, therefore it would not affect NI Railways.

At the same time, GBR will assume the existing responsibilities of Network Rail, to become the owner and manager of most railway infrastructure, including track and stations, across Great Britain.

The Rail Delivery Group and some functions of the Department for Transport (DfT) will also be integrated into the new organisation, which will be run as an arm's-length body led by industry experts.

== History ==
=== Background ===
The railway system in Great Britain was originally built and run by private companies, until in 1947 the Attlee government nationalised the big four, forming British Railways. Following a series of changes and attempted modernisations, in 1993 the Major government began a programme of privatisation of the railways. In 1994, ownership and maintenance of the infrastructure was transferred to a new company, Railtrack, which was overseen by a government-appointed Rail Regulator. The company was floated on the stock exchange in 1996 but the infrastructure was renationalised and transferred to Network Rail in 2002, after Railtrack effectively went bankrupt when its performance was criticised in the wake of the 2000 Hatfield crash.

Beginning in 1996, passenger services moved piecemeal to a franchise system run by privately owned train operating companies (TOCs) such as FirstGroup and Arriva, with the DfT (DfT OLR Holdings) taking control of a service in cases of poor performance or financial trouble. Several TOCs, including Northern and TransPennine Express, were already under state control in this way prior to the announcement of the intention to form GBR, although this was intended to be temporary. Transport for Wales Rail and ScotRail were also brought under public control by their devolved governments in 2021 and 2022 respectively.

During 2020, in the midst of the COVID-19 pandemic, all TOCs entered into Emergency Recovery Measures Agreements with the UK and Scottish governments. Normal franchise mechanisms were amended, transferring almost all revenue and cost risk to the government, effectively re-nationalising those services temporarily. In September 2020, Transport Secretary Grant Shapps axed the rail franchising system, switching to direct National Rail Contracts (NRCs) to make way for long-term reorganisation.

=== Williams–Shapps Plan ===
In 2018, the Transport Secretary for the May government, Chris Grayling, announced a review into the rail system, led by businessman Keith Williams. Published in 2021, the Williams–Shapps Rail Review recommended the formation of a new state-owned Great British Railways organisation. The proposals included the introduction of a concession model where Passenger Service Contracts (PSCs) would be awarded to privately owned operators, while GBR would control fares and timetabling.

In October 2022, the Transport Secretary for the short-lived Truss government, Anne-Marie Trevelyan, announced that the Transport Bill (which would have set up GBR) would not go ahead in the current parliamentary session. In February 2023, the subsequent Transport Secretary for the Sunak government, Mark Harper, reaffirmed the government's commitment to GBR and rail changes. The 2023 King's speech announced the progression of a draft Rail Reform Bill which would enable the establishment of GBR, although it was not timetabled in the parliamentary programme. Harper later told the Transport Select Committee that the legislation was unlikely to reach royal assent within the 2023–2024 parliamentary session.

In May 2024, the Public Accounts Committee reported the DfT had "achieved very little" on rail reform, and that the role of GBR remained unclear.

=== Establishment ===
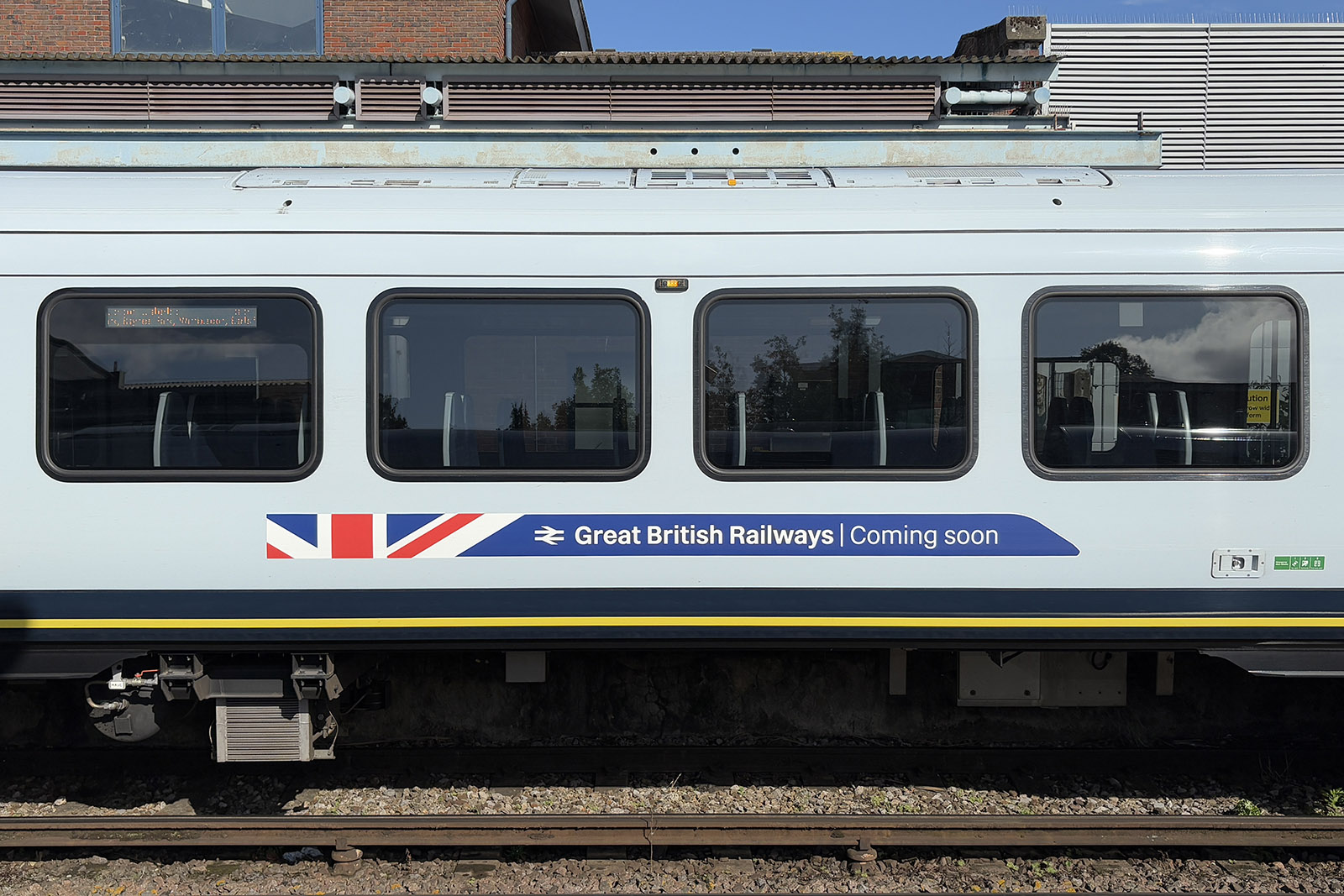
Great British Railways "coming soon" branding on a South Western Railway Class 701 train

Prior to the 2024 general election, the Labour Party revealed their plan for rail changes under the same Great British Railways name, including re-nationalising passenger services, while preserving the role of open-access operators. Each remaining service would be renationalised by 2027 as TOC contracts expired, to avoid any cost in compensation, reunifying passenger services and infrastructure under one state-owned entity for the first time since the privatisation of British Rail. Freight services would remain privately owned, and the rolling stock (the trains themselves) would remain privately owned by ROSCOs, citing the high cost of nationalisation.

Following its election victory in 2024, the Starmer government announced that GBR would be established by two bills in the first parliamentary session: the Passenger Railway Services (Public Ownership) Bill, to renationalise rail franchises as their contracts expire, and the Railways Bill, to establish GBR to oversee the passenger and freight rail network. The first of these was introduced by Transport Secretary Louise Haigh on 18 July 2024. In September 2024, the Government formed a shadow body to start the work of GBR in advance of its legal establishment. Its chair is Laura Shoaf, previously the managing director of Transport for West Midlands.

In November 2024 with the passing of the Passenger Railway Services (Public Ownership) Act 2024, the state-owned DfT Operator, previously the fallback operator in the franchise system, became the preferred operator. South Western Railway (SWR) was the first nationalisation following the reorganisation, coming under state control on 25 May 2025, with some trains receiving a GBR-branded "coming soon" livery. The first SWR service after renationalisation was partially a rail replacement bus due to planned engineering works along its route.

On 5 November 2025, the government introduced the Railways Bill to parliament. This bill, once it becomes law, will establish Great British Railways.

In October 2026, John Kingman was appointed chair of Great British Railways.

== Headquarters ==
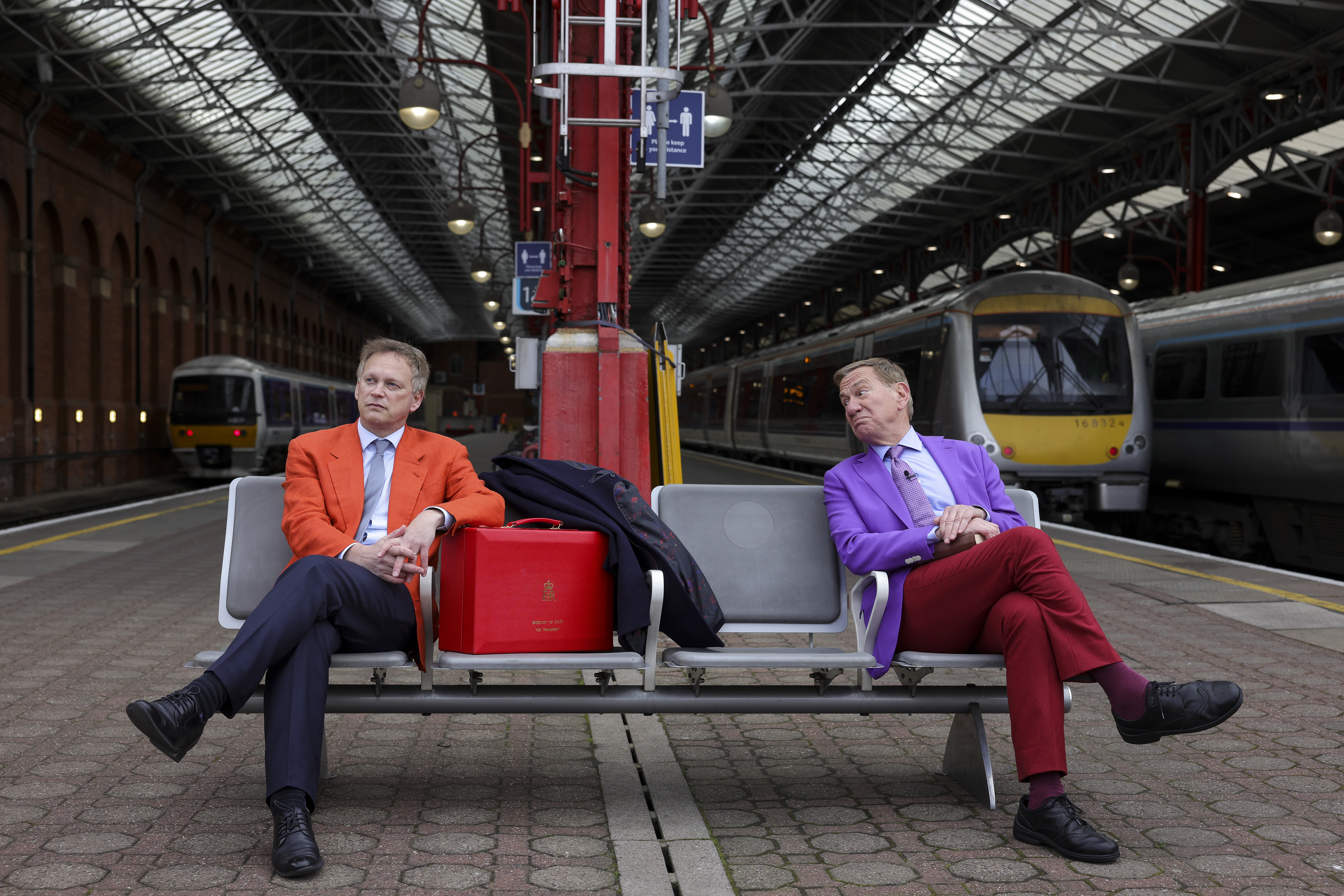
The then Transport Secretary Grant Shapps and broadcaster Michael Portillo promote the national competition to host the headquarters of Great British Railways

The government promised to base the organisation outside London to promote economic growth and skills in a region outside the capital. In February 2022, the DfT launched a public consultation for the location of GBR's headquarters. In total, 42 towns and cities submitted expressions of interest.

A shortlist comprising Birmingham, Crewe, Derby, Doncaster, Newcastle upon Tyne, and York was announced in July 2022, using the following criteria: alignment with "levelling up" objectives; connected and easy to get to; opportunities for GBR; railway heritage and links to the network; value for money; and public support. A public vote was held following the announcement.

In March 2023, then Transport Secretary Mark Harper announced Derby as the headquarters location. Construction of the new headquarters at Becketwell in the city will commence in early 2027 and will be completed by 2029.

== Branding ==
The British Rail Double Arrow symbol

The GBR logo makes use of the Double Arrow symbol – designed by Gerry Barney in 1965 for British Rail, and later used by National Rail – with 'Great British Railways' in the Rail Alphabet typeface. In some forms, the initialism GBR is used.

The Williams-Shapps plan recommended that there be a single, unifying brand for the railways, and it was expected that there would be a gradual rebranding over time.

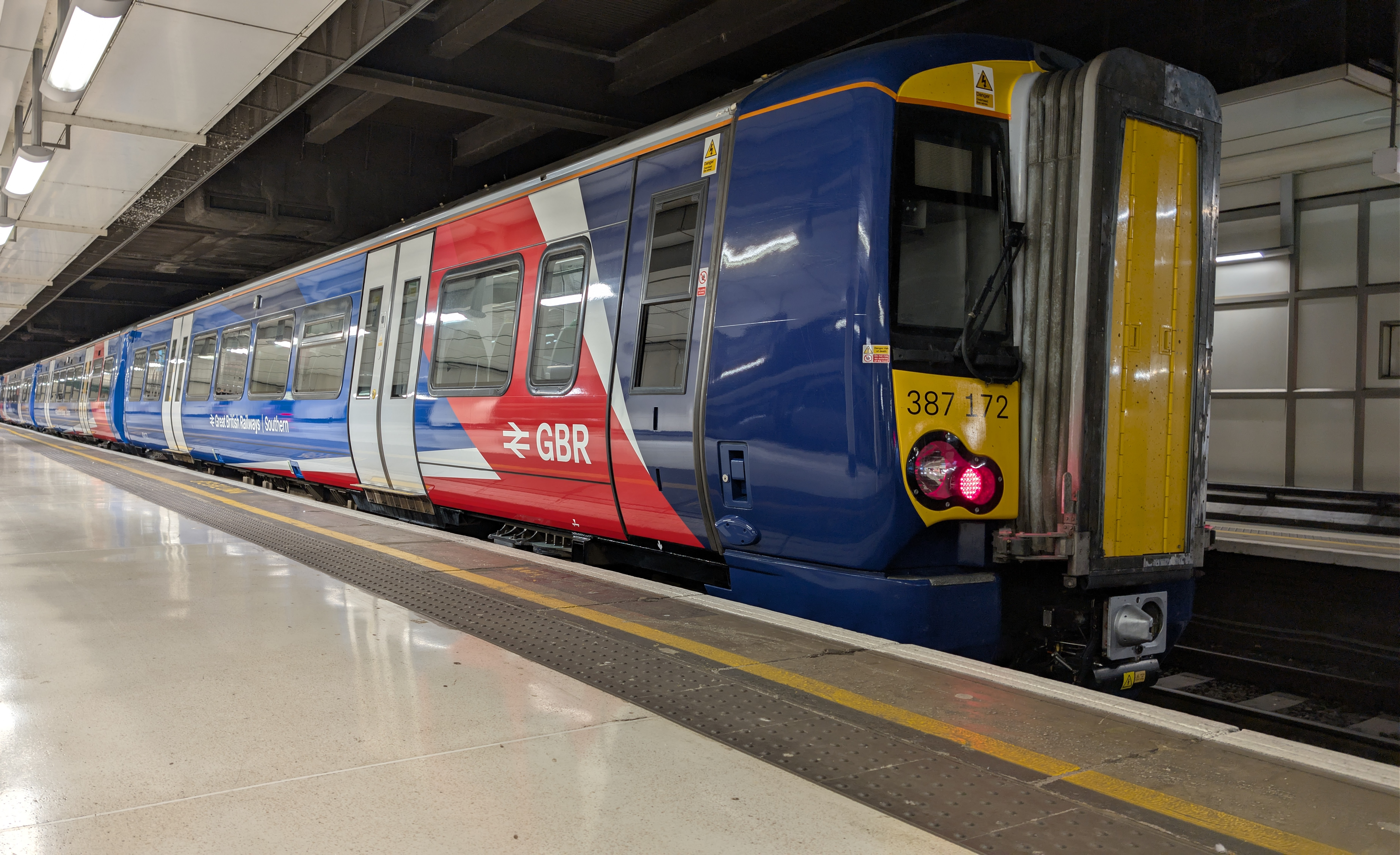
A Class 387 in GBR livery at London Victoria station

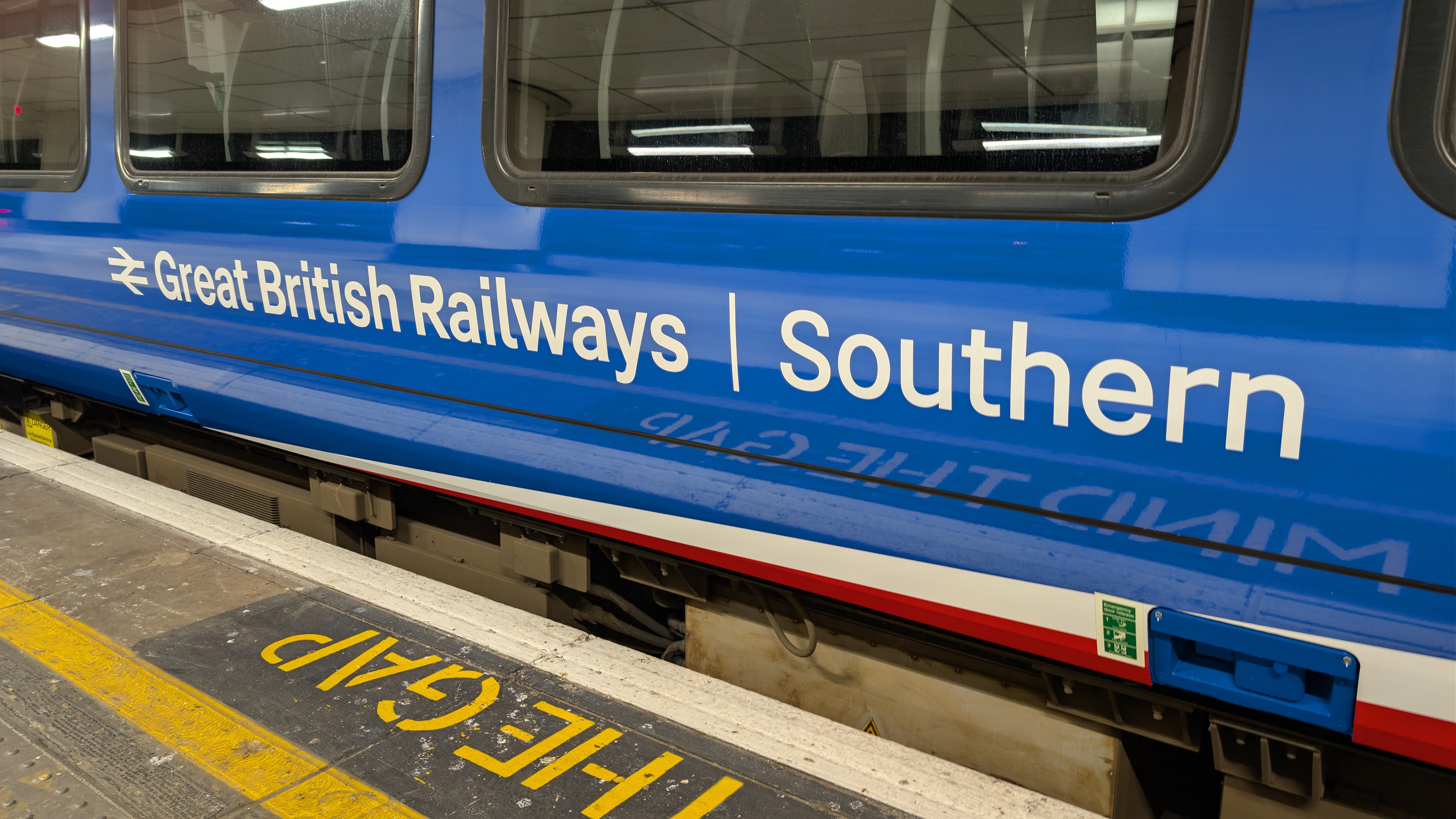
Livery on the side of the train shows both "Great British Railways" and the brand name "Southern"

A livery mockup revealed in December 2025 features extensive use of Union Flag colours (red, white, and blue) in angular forms, with both inter-city and commuter trains sharing a consistent design.

The branding was designed in-house at the Department for Transport. A gradual roll-out of the branding nationally is expected to begin in spring 2026. At the unveiling, Transport Secretary Heidi Alexander said that the branding "represents a new railway, casting off the frustrations of the past and focused entirely on delivering a proper public service for passengers." However, Stephen Bayley, the founder of the Design Museum, said of it; "It's atrocious. A mad dog's breakfast", adding that "A livery is branding and branding is all about associations and expectations", telling The Telegraph that "In this sense, they’ve got it right. It projects the values of the sponsoring organisation: artless, careless, clumsy, unintelligent and uncoordinated”.

A Southern Class 387 unit was the first train to receive full GBR livery, and was unveiled at a press event in Brighton in May 2026, followed by a Class 701 Arterio unit of South Western Railway.

The first station in the country to carry GBR branding is Cambridge South, which opened in June 2026.

In July 2026, it was confirmed that 'GBR Anglia' had been established, consolidating the operations of c2c, Greater Anglia and Network Rail Anglia into one leadership team. Two Class 357 and Class 720 units in the GBR livery were displayed at London Liverpool Street the same day.

== Function and composition ==
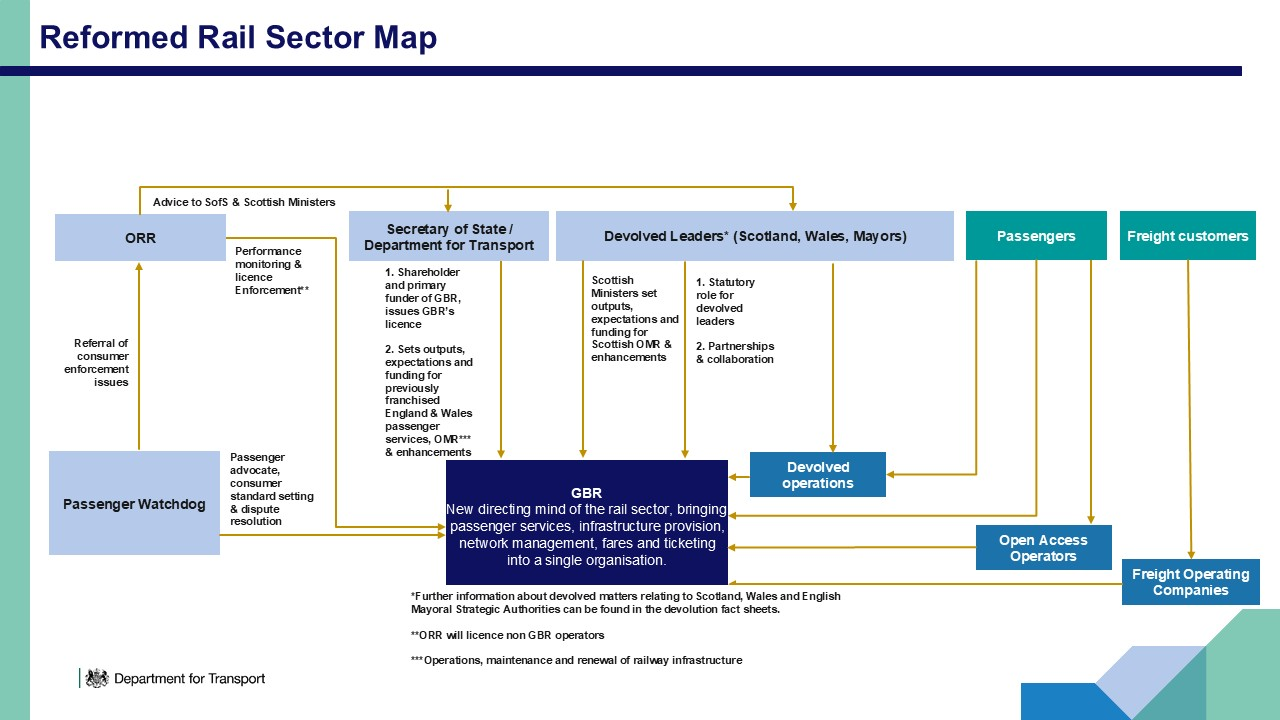
Planned structure of the rail sector in the UK following GBR's creation

In addition to bringing together multiple railway companies under one umbrella, GBR will establish a single website and mobile app to sell tickets, replacing the websites and apps operated by 14 train operating companies. Independent vendors, such as Trainline, will continue to retail tickets to the public.

=== Entities expected to be integrated into GBR ===
- Network Rail – the railway infrastructure manager, established after the collapse of the privately-owned Railtrack. GBR will be formed from Network Rail and take over the management of all train stations and track.
- DfT Operator – the state-owned holding company which currently is responsible for taking over train operating companies that are being renationalised under the Passenger Railway Services (Public Ownership) Act.
- Train operating companies (TOCs) owned by DfT Operator will be integrated into GBR:

Operator	Public ownership	Reference
Avanti West Coast	7 March 2027	
c2c	20 July 2025	
Chiltern Railways	20 September 2026	
CrossCountry	by end of 2027 (expected)	
East Midlands Railway	by end of 2027 (expected)	
Greater Anglia	12 October 2025	
Great Western Railway	13 December 2026	
Greater Thameslink Railway	31 May 2026	
London North Eastern Railway	24 June 2018	
Northern Trains	1 March 2020	
Southeastern	17 October 2021	
South Western Railway	25 May 2025	
TransPennine Express	28 May 2023	
West Midlands Trains	1 February 2026	

- Rail Delivery Group – a railway industry umbrella organisation which brings together passenger and freight rail companies, and is responsible for the National Rail brand and its enquiries service. Its other functions include delivery of fares, ticketing and retail programmes. These functions will be integrated into GBR.
- Office of Rail and Road (some functions) – GBR is expected to take over some of the railway functions of the ORR, including the management of track access to open-access operators.

=== Entities expected to remain operationally independent from GBR ===
- ScotRail and Caledonian Sleeper – operate most local, regional, and intercity passenger services in Scotland, and sleeper services to London. Already taken back into Scottish Government ownership and managed by Scottish Rail Holdings.
- Transport for Wales Rail – operates most local passenger services in Wales. It took over services on the Wales & Borders franchise from KeolisAmey Wales in 2021 when the Welsh government decided to renationalise train services. TfW Rail is a subsidiary of Transport for Wales.
- Open-access operators – operate services on some routes and are not subject to franchising. These currently include Eurostar, Grand Central, Heathrow Express, Hull Trains and Lumo. It is expected that these operators will continue to run services following GBR's establishment.
- Locally devolved railways such as the Elizabeth line, London Overground, and Merseyrail.
- Rolling stock companies (ROSCOs), which own the locomotives and carriages used on the rail network, will remain privatised and continue to lease existing rolling stock to GBR. In its September 2026 Rolling stock and infrastructure strategy policy paper, DfT set out plans to buy some rolling stock directly, to be decided on a case-by-case basis, rather than lease from ROSCOs.

== See also ==
- History of rail transport in Great Britain 1995 to date
- Outline of British Rail
- Impact of the privatisation of British Rail
- Renationalisation of British Rail
- Campaign to Bring Back British Rail
