= Gerry Barney =

British graphic designer (born 1939)

- Born: Gerald Barney; 18 September 1939 (age 86)
- Occupation: Designer
- Known for: British Rail Double Arrow VAG Rounded

The British Rail "Double Arrow" designed by Gerald Barney, 1965

Gerald Lawrence Barney (born 18 September 1939) is a British designer, best known for his 1965 British Rail Double Arrow, which is still in use in the UK.

In 1960, aged 21, Barney started his career at the Design Research Unit (DRU) as a lettering artist, and soon became close to the studio’s co-founder, Milner Gray. At the DRU, Barney designed logos including the British Rail Double Arrow.

He later worked for Wolff Olins, and in 1978, together with his colleagues David Bristow, Kit Cooper and Terence Griffin, set up British design agency Sedley Place.

In 2021, the Rail Delivery Group (RDG) hoped that Barney would endorse a new version of the logo in different shades of green, to highlight the environmental benefits of train travel. However, he said: "I could understand it if they had just swapped red for green. But why on earth have they got that many colours? It's a load of old bollocks. It's just a mess."
