= Worboys Committee =

Committee formed by the British government to review signage on British roads

Cover of the report

The Worboys Committee, under the leadership of Walter John Worboys, was formed by the British government to review signage on all British roads. In its July 1963 report Traffic signs: report of the committee on traffic signs for all-purpose roads, it found existing road signs to be obsolete for the increasing numbers of motor vehicles and their increasing speeds, and made over a dozen key recommendations. The committee went on to completely revise road signs in Britain, with an emphasis on symbols alone, adopting standard colour and shape practices used in mainland Europe and a new typeface. Its principles were adopted and are still the basis of all road signs in the United Kingdom.

== The Anderson Committee ==
The first moves to a new signage system were prompted by the first motorways. Flaws of existing signs had already been observed with drivers at speed struggling to interpret them. New signs were needed in 1958 for the opening of the Preston By-pass, the first motorway. A separate committee, known as the 'Anderson Committee', was assembled in 1957 to design signage. The committee took inspiration from the United States and Germany who were designing their own motorways and signage to go with them. Two graphic designers were commissioned to design the system of signage: Jock Kinneir and his assistant (and later business partner) Margaret Calvert.

== The Worboys Committee and advisors ==
Two articles were published in 1961 by graphic designer Herbert Spencer, illustrating the shortcomings of non-motorway British road signs. The committee was created, chaired by Sir Walter John Worboys of ICI. T. G. Usborne of the Ministry of Transport had charge of proceedings, and Kinneir and Calvert were again commissioned as designers.

In 1963 the committee released Traffic signs: report of the committee on traffic signs for all-purpose roads. This completely revised road signs in Britain with an emphasis on symbols alone. It adopted standard colour and shape practices used in mainland Europe and used a new typeface that had already been used on the motorway signs, called Transport. On 1 January 1965, the Traffic Signs Regulations and General Directions (TSRGD), the legal framework for road signs in Britain, was revised to adopt the proposed changes in the report.

== Pre-Worboys sign flaws ==
In 1963, traffic signs used a mixture of styles from various dates (see History of Road Signs in the UK). Their origins lay in four standard designs set out in 1904:

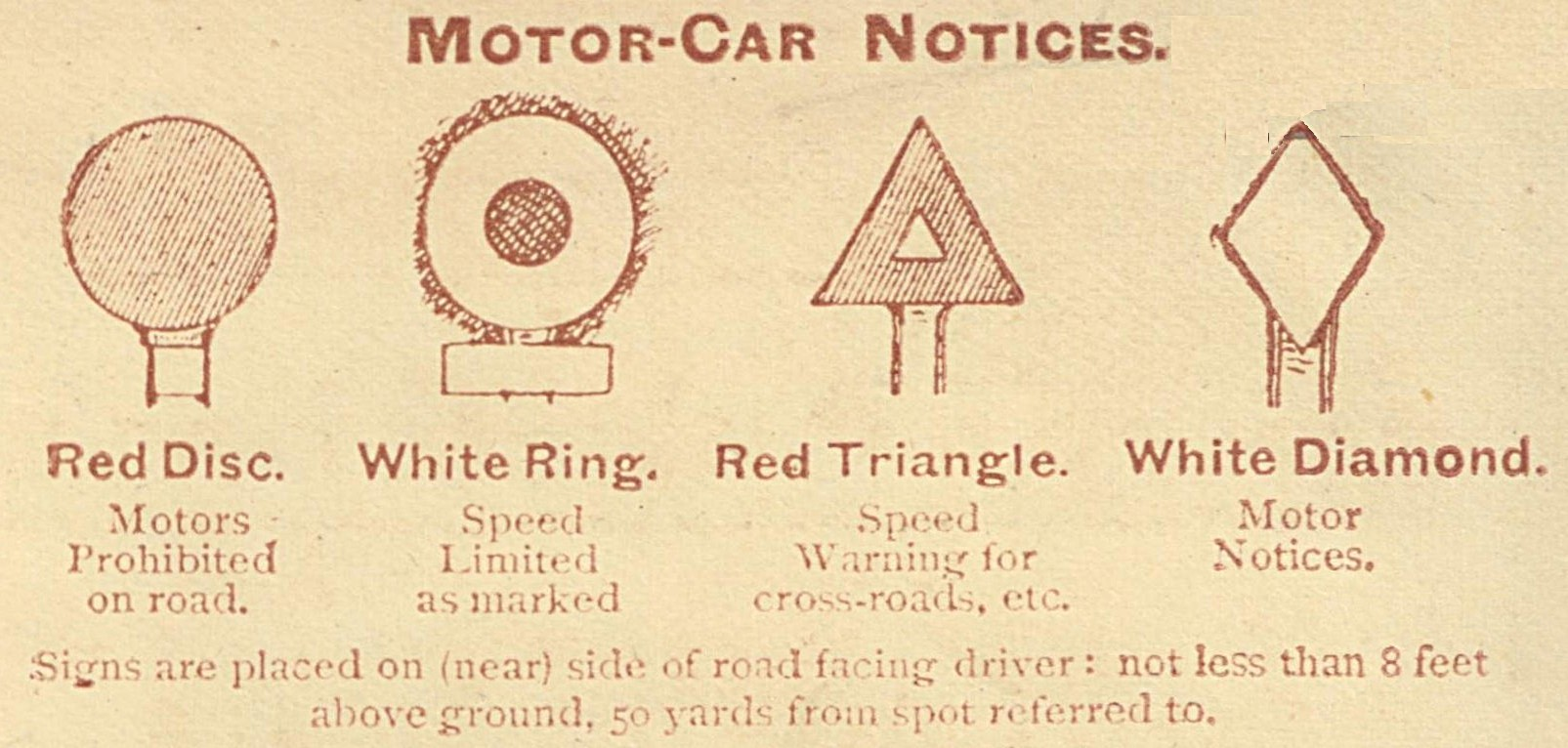
UK Traffic Signs 1904

- Prohibitory signs: to be surmounted by a solid red disc 18 inches in diameter
- Speed limit signs: to have a hollow white ring 18 inches in diameter above a plate giving the speed limit in figures
- Caution signs: to be surmounted by a hollow red equilateral triangle with 18-inch sides
- Other notices: to be on diamond-shaped boards

In 1920, the Maybury Committee had introduced symbols on caution signs but had retained brief text. There had been several rounds of revisions to the signs but old signs were often left in place, with the new designs only used at new sites or when the old sign was decrepit. The variety was greatest among speed limit signs, where the old style took the form of a red disc with a plate such as "SPEED LIMIT 20 M.P.H" below. Newer speed limit signs had black numbers inside a red ring. The "Speed Limit Ends" sign (white circle with a black diagonal) was derived from the cancellation of a 1904 white speed limit ring.

The report found eight primary flaws in the United Kingdom's traffic signage.

(a) roadside signs are too small to be readily recognisable as such and to be easily read by drivers travelling at the normal speed of traffic;

(b) they do not have a simple, integrated appearance;
(c) the more important signs are not readily distinguishable from the less important at long range;
(d) they are often not effective at night;
(e) they are different from those used on the continent of Europe and only those who can read English can fully understand them;
(f) they are often mounted too high, particularly in rural areas;
(g) they are often badly sited in relation to junctions; and

(h) there is insufficient continuity of place names on directional signs.

— Worboys Committee, Traffic signs: report of the committee on traffic signs for all-purpose roads (1963)

== "Traffic signs – 1963" ==
The Worboys Report

The report found existing road signs to be completely obsolete in view of increasing numbers of motor vehicles and their increasing speeds. In paragraph 26 it enunciated seven principles:

(a) the signs must be designed for the foreseeable traffic conditions and speeds on the roads on which they are to be used;

(b) they should be conspicuous so that they will attract the attention of drivers at a sufficient distance and should be easily recognisable as traffic signs at that distance;

(c) they should contain only essential information and their significance should be clear at a glance so that the driver’s attention is not distracted from the task of driving;

(d) they should be legible from sufficiently far away to be read without diverting the gaze through too great an angle;

(e) they should be placed so that they are obscured as little as possible by vehicles and other objects;

(f) they should be designed and sited so that after reading the sign the driver is left with sufficient time to take any necessary action with safety; and

(g) they should be effective both by night and day.

It proposed a coherent structure for traffic signs, based largely on the 1949 UN Protocol on Road Signs and Signals. As the report explained:

46. The Protocol requires that signs should be of three basic shapes — triangular for warning signs, circular for those giving definite instructions and rectangular for informatory signs. It further requires that: —

(a) warning and prohibitory signs (with one or two exceptions) should have a red border with a white or light yellow ground and black or dark symbols ;

(b) mandatory signs should have white symbols on a blue background ;

(c) directional signs should be in light lettering on a dark background, or vice versa; and

(d) other informatory signs should have white legends on a blue background or, in certain cases, black symbols on a white rectangular background within a blue surround.

The structure which Worboys proposed was:

A. Signs Giving Definite Instructions

(a) Mandatory Signs

51. In general the mandatory signs recommended have a white symbol on a blue circular background. But there are two deliberate exceptions; the Stop and Give way signs have distinct shapes and colours and capital letters in order to produce a more immediate impact.

(b) Prohibitory Signs

63. With the exception of the No entry sign and waiting restriction signs all prohibitory signs are distinguished by a red circle with a white centre which usually carries a black symbol. Waiting restriction and limited parking signs are dealt with in paragraphs 83 to 87.

(c) Waiting restriction and limited parking signs

B. Warning Signs

88. Warning signs are distinguished by a red triangle containing a black symbol on a white ground.

C. Informatory Signs

130. Protocol informatory signs are basically rectangular.

D.Temporary Signs

Worboys applied this structure consistently. It led, for instance, to the "pass either side" sign (which is used on bollards) being rectangular because it is informatory. This did not survive into the regulations: presumably the cost of having separate bollards with rectangular and circular signs could not be justified.

Among over a dozen key recommendations were:

- Letter sizes should be increased compared to existing signs and up to 10 inches (250 mm) on high-speed roads. Wording should be Sentence case, not in all capital letters.
- Provision of give way and stop signs at junctions on minor roads when they meet primary routes.
- More usage of sign illumination, and improvements to existing standards and increased use of cat's eyes (roadway reflectors).
- Uniformity in the deployment and use of traffic signs.
- Clearer marking of primary routes, through use of colour-coded signs to aid drivers in identifying them if they are unfamiliar with an area.
- Direction signs should be colour-coded, with primary routes having green signs with white words and yellow route numbers; signs on-priority roads should be black and white.

The new Worboys designs for warning signs had a minimum height of 24 inches (610 mm), and three additional sizes: 30 inches (2 ft 6 in; 760 mm), 48 inches (4 ft 0 in; 1,200 mm), 72 inches (6 ft 0 in; 1,800 mm) (Note: 72 inch signs were only prescribed for Junction and roadway narrows signs. Other warning signs were only prescribed up to 48 inches tall.) for higher-speed roads or special situations that warranted a larger sign. Regulatory signs were 24 inches (610 mm), and greatly simplified through use of symbols eliminating wordy signs. (Note: The 1944 weight restriction sign consisted of this message: "One vehicle only on bridge Maximum weight 15 tons speed limit 5 M.P.H.", on a sign that was about 2 feet (610 mm) square. The replacement, Sign 626, consisted of just "XX Tons" in a 24 inches (610 mm) circle, with an additional "Only one vehicle on bridge" plate if necessary.)

The report suggested approximately 136 signs. (Note: This count excludes supplementing plates.) The designs proposed in the report received further revisions before the 1964 TSRGD. Some of the proposed prohibitory signs featured a diagonal 'slash', e.g. 'Bicycles prohibited', 'All motor vehicles prohibited', which were omitted; those on No Right turn. No Left Turn and No U-turns were retained. Other changes were largely cosmetic, e.g. updating the appearance of a telephone handset.

Examples of Pre- and Post-Worboys Committee traffic signs
| Pre-Worboys sign | | | Type of sign | Meaning | Sign number (Note: From the 1964 TSRGD. Some sign numbers have since changed.) | TSRGD 1964 (post-Worboys) sign |
| 1933 set | 1944 set | 1955 set | Type of sign | Meaning | Sign number | TSRGD 1964 (post-Worboys) sign |
|---|---|---|---|---|---|---|
| | | | Warning | Cross roads | 504 | |
| | | | Warning | Roundabout | 510 | |
| | | | Warning | Bend to left | 512 | |
| | | | Warning | Bend to right | 512 | |
| | | | Warning | Two way traffic | 521 | |
| | | | Warning | Level crossing with no gates | 538 | |
| | | | Warning | Signals ahead | 543 | |
| | | | Warning | Children | 545 | |
| | | | Warning | School | 545/546 | |
| | | | Warning | Cattle | 548 | |
| | | | Warning | Ford (water crossing) | 554 | |
| | | | Warning | No through road | 816 | |
| | | | Warning | Road works ahead | 564 | |
| | | | Regulatory | Major road ahead | 602 | |
| | | | Regulatory | Stop | 601 | |
| | | | Regulatory | Turn left | 606 | |
| | | | Regulatory | Turn right | 606 | |
| | | | Regulatory | Keep left | 610 | |
| | | | Regulatory | No right turn | 612 | |
| | | | Regulatory | No left turn | 613 | |
| | | | Regulatory | No entry | 616 | |
| | | | Regulatory | No motor vehicles The pre-1944 lozenge, in black or white, was used to display a detailed message, such as in | 619 | |
| | | | Regulatory | No cycling | 624 | |
| | | | Regulatory | No waiting | 636 | |
| | | | Speed limit | Speed limit | 630 | |
| | | | Speed limit | National speed limit applies | 630 | |
| | | | Information | Parking | 801 | |
| | | | Direction | Approach direction sign for a junction where two Class 1 (A-roads) roads cross. | 704 | |
| | | | Direction | A direction sign used at junctions, indicating route numbers and primary destinations. | 713 | |

== Consistency with motorway signs ==
In 1962, the Anderson Committee published Motorway Signs: Final Report of Advisory Committee for Traffic Signs on Motorways which laid out their designs for motorway signage.

Ultimately, motorway directional and informational signs were included in the 1964 TSRGD. The warning and most regulatory signs proposed in the final Anderson report were not adopted for use, (Note: The designs were often similar, with the consistent difference being the inclusion of words and colour scheme; A non-reflective red background, with a reflective red border that outlined the shape of the sign and a reflective white symbol.) and the designs proposed in the Worboys report were used instead in future motorway projects.

== Later revisions ==
A major review of the direction signing system conducted in the late 1980s found effectively no problems with the Worboys system. This review could only recommend the introduction of white-on-brown tourist signing and a few other minor changes, later known as the Guildford Rules. "Worboys was a world leader in good signing practice".

== See also ==
- Transport (typeface) – proposed by the report and still used in Britain for road signs
- Road signs in the United Kingdom
