= Milner Gray (designer) =

Milner Connorton Gray CBE (1899–1997) was one of the key figures of British industrial design in the 20th century, having played an important role in establishing design as a recognized profession, the emergence of British design consultancies, and the development of Design Management.

== Background ==
Gray studied painting and design at Goldsmiths College School of Art, London University, where he was a fellow student and friend of the artist-designer Graham Sutherland. During the First World War he served in the Royal Engineers where, like other celebrated artists and designers in both World Wars, he was involved in camouflage work. In 1930 he became a founder member of the Society of Industrial Artists (SIA, see Chartered Society of Designers), which sought to gain professional recognition for the designer in industry. By this time multidisciplinary design consultancies had begun to emerge in the United States. Almost by way of response Gray established the Bassett-Gray Group of Artists and Writers in 1934 which became the Industrial Design Partnership (1935–40), dealing mainly with graphics and product design. One of the cofounders of the latter, Misha Black, joined with Gray and Herbert Read to establish the Design Research Unit (DRU) in 1943, a consultancy which sought to provide design expertise for post-war industry, commerce, and the state. It became widely recognized for corporate identity design for many leading companies and organizations, such as Courage Breweries, ICI, and the British Aluminium Company. During the late 1930s, Gray taught at the Chelsea School of Art, the Reimann School of Art and Design and Goldsmiths' College.

During the Second World War Gray was employed on the recommendation of Frank Pick at the Ministry of Information, initially as head of its newly formed exhibitions division then as an adviser on exhibition design, a field of expertise which he subsequently applied successfully in the Design at Home exhibition of 1945, the Britain Can Make It exhibition of 1946, and the Festival of Britain of 1951.

== Roles and recognitions ==
Gray was also involved in design education, with numerous teaching appointments at leading art schools, including the Royal College of Art and the Sir John Cass school, where he was principal from 1937 to 1940. He also advised the BBC on its series Looking at Things, which was broadcast between 1949 and 1955. He was active as a lecturer and writer on many aspects of design, including Package Design (1955) and Lettering for Architects and Designers (1962). Through the DRU he also played a significant role as a consultant to industry. One of his most ambitious projects was the framing, in 1964, of the British Railways corporate identity programme, the working party for which he had chaired.

He also received official recognition: in 1938 he was elected Royal Designer for Industry, was appointed Master of the Faculty of Royal Designers for Industry in 1955, and was awarded the SIA's first Gold Medal for outstanding design achievement. He was awarded CBE in the 1963 Birthday Honours, and in the same year was elected as Master of the Art Workers' Guild.
