= Margaret Calvert =

British typographer and graphic designer (born 1936)

Margaret Vivienne Calvert OBE RDI
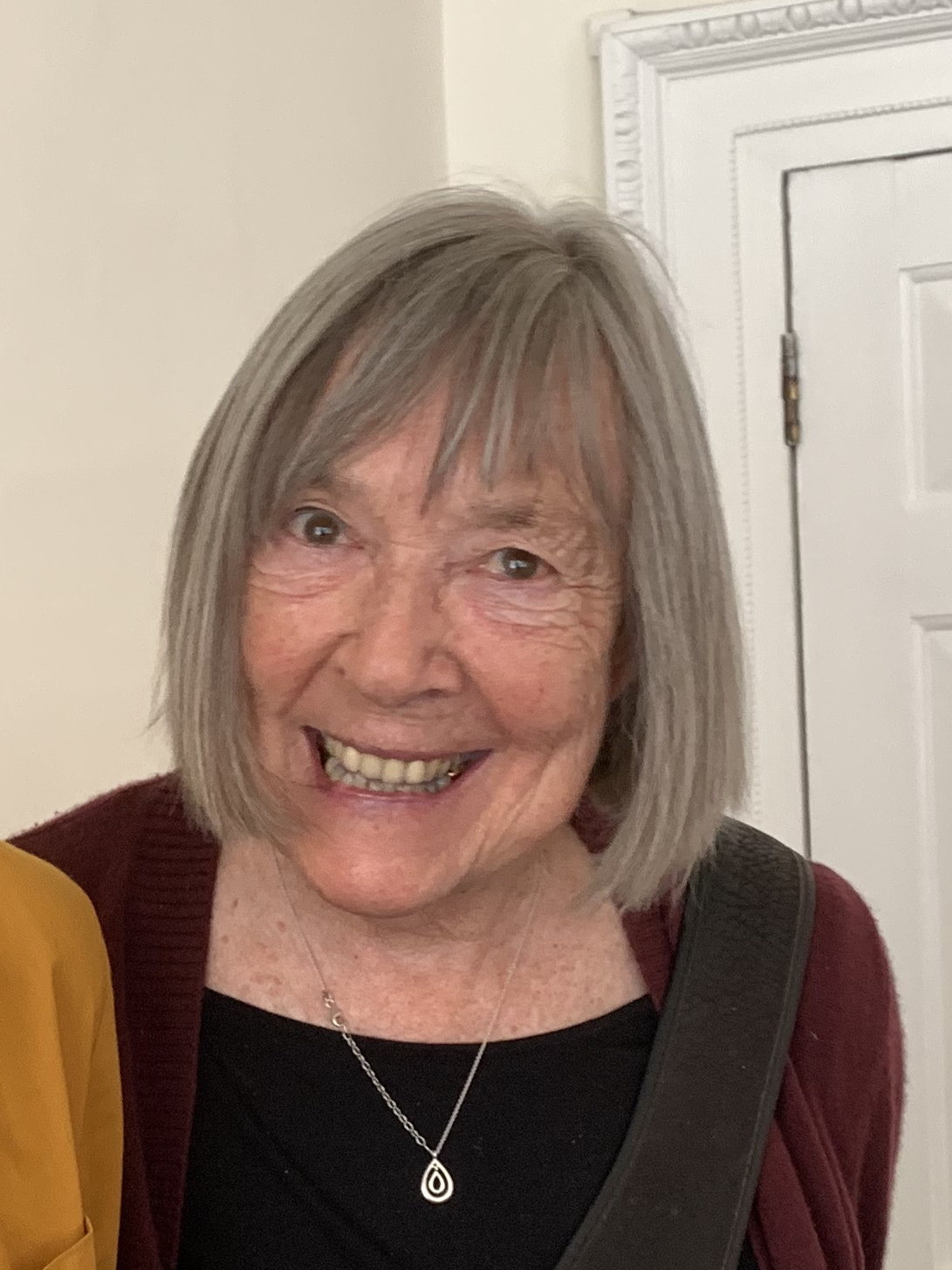
- Margaret Calvert in 2019
- Born: 12 May 1936 (age 90); Union of South Africa
- Education: St Paul's Girls' School, London; Chelsea College of Arts, London
- Occupations: Typographer and graphic designer
- Years active: 1957–present
- Known for: Design of road signs in the United Kingdom, Crown Dependencies and British Overseas Territories.
- Notable work: Transport; Rail Alphabet; Motorway; Calvert
- Awards: Officer of the Order of the British Empire

Margaret Vivienne Calvert OBE RDI (born 1936) is a British typographer and graphic designer who, with colleague Jock Kinneir, designed many of the road signs used throughout the United Kingdom, Crown Dependencies, and British Overseas Territories, as well as the Transport typeface used on road signs, the Rail Alphabet typeface used on the British railway system, and an early version of the signs used in airports. The typeface developed by Kinneir and Calvert was further developed into New Transport and used for the single-domain GOV.UK website in the United Kingdom.

== Early life and education ==
Born in South Africa, Calvert moved to England in 1950, where she studied at St Paul's Girls' School and the Chelsea College of Art. Kinneir, her tutor there, asked her to help him design the signs for Gatwick Airport. They chose the black on yellow scheme for the signs after researching the most effective combination. They also designed luggage labels for P & O Lines in 1957.

== Career ==
In 1957, Kinneir was appointed head of British signs for Britain's roads. He then hired Calvert to redesign the road sign system and she came up with simple, easy-to-understand pictograms, including the signs for 'men at work' (a man digging), 'farm animals' (based on a cow named Patience that lived on a farm near to where she grew up), and 'schoolchildren nearby' (a girl leading a boy by the hand, which she said were actually modelled after herself), using the European protocol of triangular signs for warnings and circles for mandatory restrictions. The Worboys Committee was formed by the British government in July 1963 to review signage on all British roads.

In addition to her road signs, Calvert has designed commercial typefaces for Monotype, including the eponymous Calvert typeface, a slab serif design which she created in 1980. It originated in a 1970s proposal to the French new town of Saint Quentin-en-Yvelines for a new typeface to provide a visual identity for the town. However, the slab-serif typeface and three-dimensional letter shapes were rejected. The typeface was later adopted by the Tyne and Wear Metro system as well as north-east England bus and ferry services in the 1980s.

In 2020 a new version of the typeface used in the UK rail system was introduced, Rail Alphabet 2. It was designed in collaboration with Henrik Kubel.

Calvert taught at the Royal College of Art for almost 40 years and was head of graphics from 1987 to 1991.

== Recognition ==
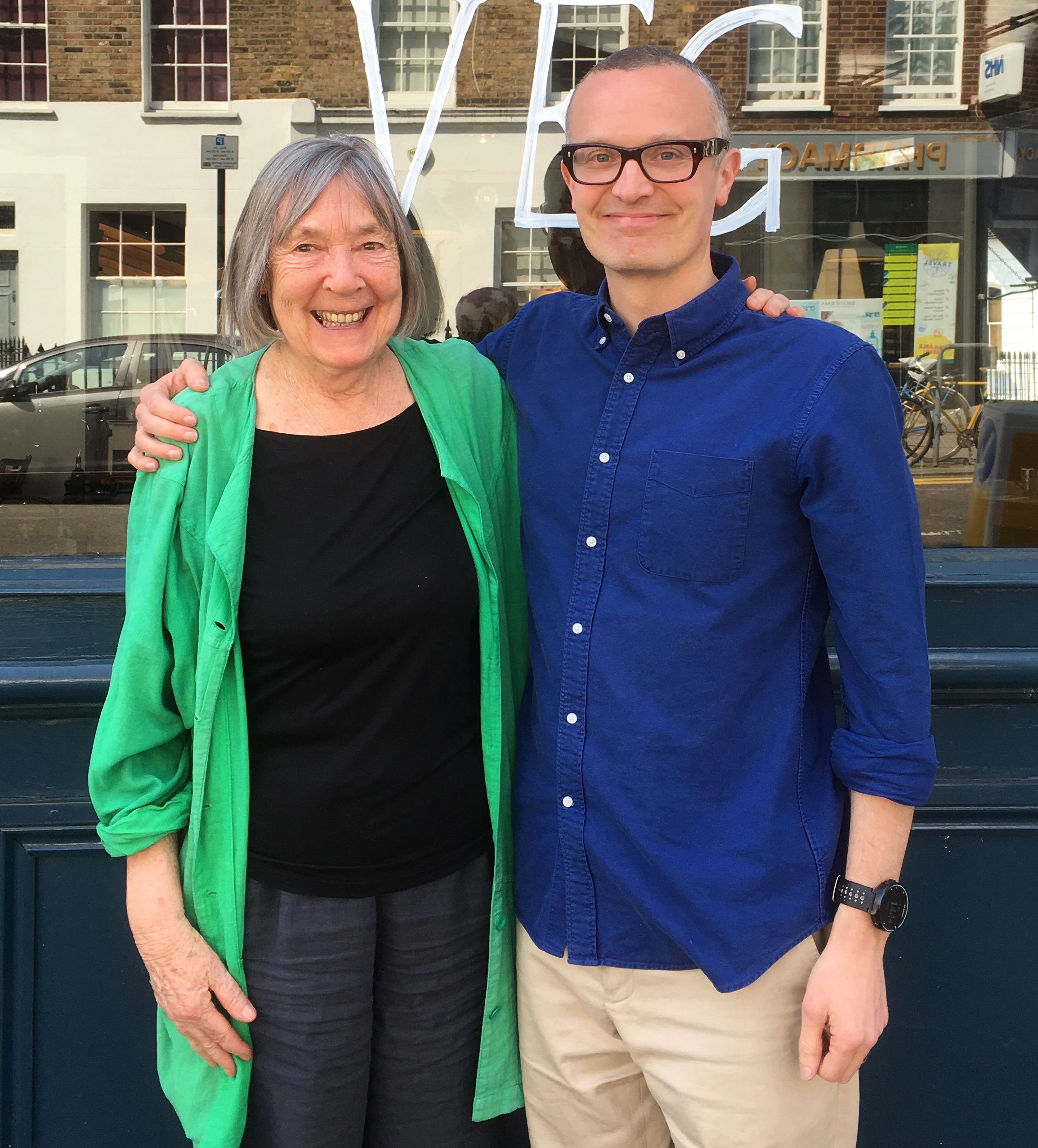
Margaret Calvert with Ben Terrett in 2018

Calvert was awarded an honorary degree by the University of the Arts London in 2004.

She appeared on the fourteenth season of the famous motoring show, Top Gear on 3 January 2010. James May interviewed her in a 2009 Vauxhall Insignia VXR, talking about the design process of the UK road signs.

She was made a Royal Designer for Industry for Graphic Design in 2011. In 2015, she was presented with the D&AD President's Award.

Calvert was appointed Officer of the Order of the British Empire (OBE) in the 2016 Birthday Honours for services to typography and road safety.

The primary route sign system designed by Kinneir and Calvert between 1957 and 1967 entered the design collection of the Museum of Modern Art in New York, which presented their work in the audio programme Pirouette: Turning Points in Design. The same system remains the legal basis of road signage in the United Kingdom, the Crown Dependencies and several British Overseas Territories in the 2020s, with revisions limited to the 2016 Traffic Signs Regulations and General Directions.

In June 2018 she was awarded an Honorary Fellowship by Arts University Bournemouth alongside dancer Darcey Bussell, costume designer Jenny Beavan OBE and director and screenwriter Edgar Wright.

A retrospective exhibition of her work, Margaret Calvert: Woman at Work, was held from 21 October 2020 till 10 January 2021 at the Design Museum in London. An illustrated book with the same title written by Margaret Calvert, Adrian Shaughnessy, John L Walters, and Marion Deuchars, was published in 2026 by Thames and Hudson. A documentary film about the history of British road signs called 'And give way to design' and directed by Patricio Orozco is due out in March 2025.

== Gallery of work ==
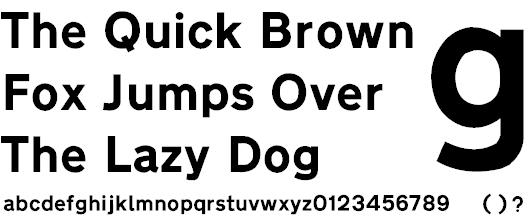
Transport typeface, used on road signs in the UK and several other countries

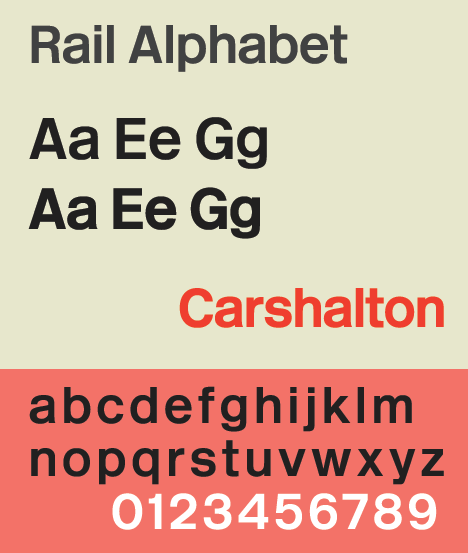
Rail Alphabet typeface, used throughout British Rail and formerly the National Health Service in the UK

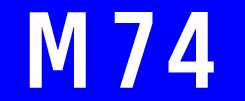
Motorway typeface, used for road numbering on UK motorways

Motorway Typeface - 1958 Sample

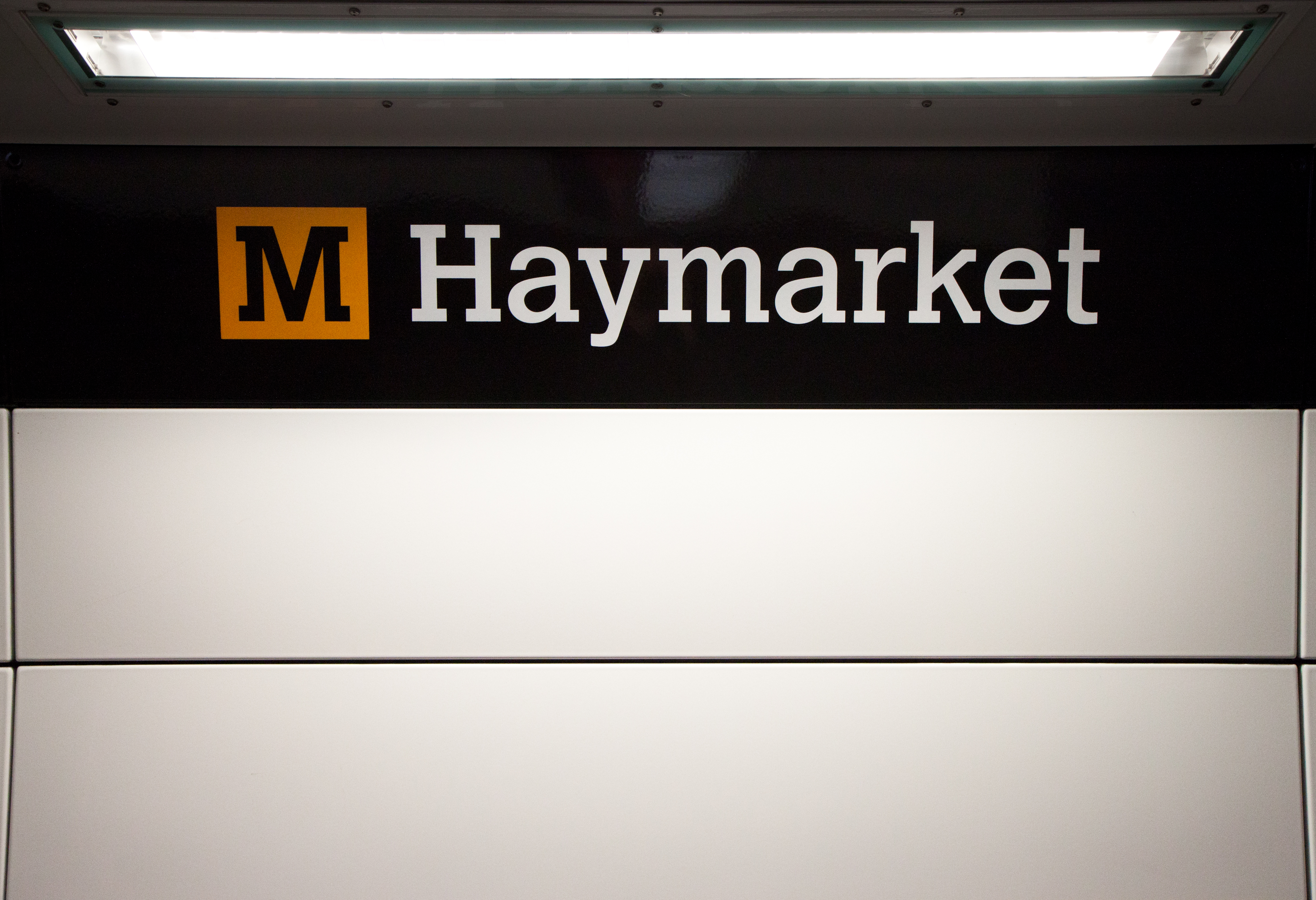
Calvert typeface, on a sign from Haymarket station on the Tyne and Wear Metro

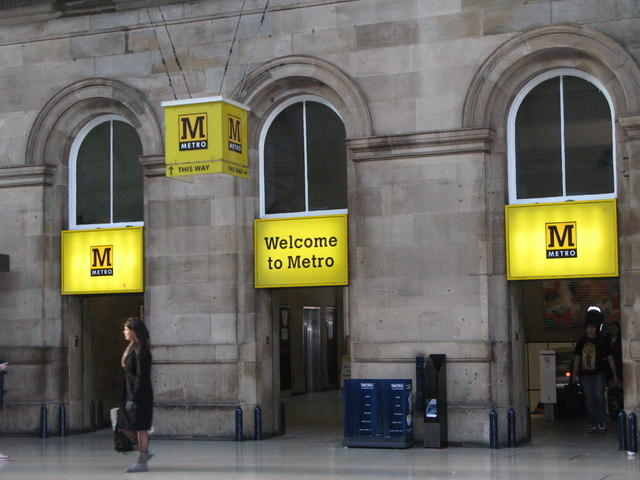
Calvert typeface on the Tyne and Wear Metro

Roadworks sign used in the UK, one of the pictographic signs designed by Calvert ahead of the 1963 Worboys Review

UK road sign warning of farm animals, based on a cow Calvert remembered from her childhood

UK road sign warning of wild animals, inspired by Eadweard Muybridge's photographs of animals in motion.

UK road sign warning of schoolchildren, one of the pictographic signs designed by Calvert ahead of the 1963 Worboys Review
