= Jock Kinneir =

British typographer and graphic designer (1917–1994)

- Born: Richard Kinneir; 11 February 1917; Aldershot, Hampshire, England, United Kingdom
- Died: 23 August 1994 (aged 77); Oxford, Oxfordshire, England, United Kingdom
- Education: Chelsea College of Arts
- Occupations: Graphic designer, typographer

UK Tourist Sign T135 - English or Welsh horceracing course

Richard "Jock" Kinneir (11 February 1917 – 23 August 1994) was a British typographer and graphic designer who, with his colleague Margaret Calvert, designed many of the road signs used throughout the United Kingdom, Crown Dependencies, and British Overseas Territories. Their system has become a model for modern road signage.

== Background ==
Kinneir was born in Hampshire in 1917. He studied engraving at the Chelsea School of Art from 1935 to 1939. After World War II, Kinneir was employed as an exhibition designer by the Central Office of Information. He next worked for the Design Research Unit, and then opened his own practice in 1956. Kinneir taught at the Royal College of Art, where he was head of the graphic design department. He also taught part-time at the Chelsea School of Art.

Kinneir and his wife Joan had three children and seven grandchildren.

== Career ==
Kinneir's first large commission was the design of the signage for Gatwick Airport. He chose one of his students at Chelsea, Margaret Calvert, to assist him. When Sir Colin Anderson, the chairman of P&O read about the Gatwick signage, he chose Kinneir to design a baggage labelling system for P&O.

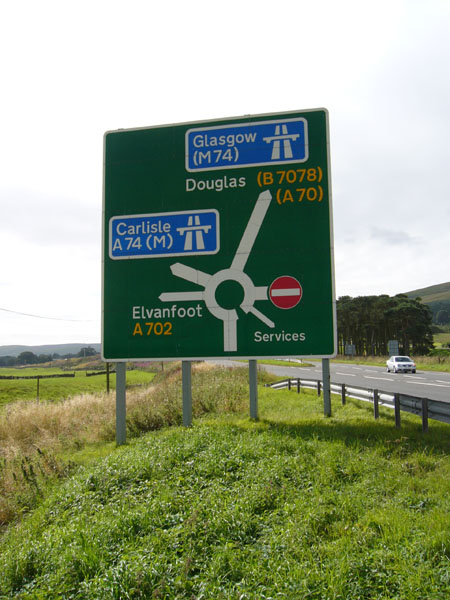
A typical roundabout sign on a primary road

Motorway Typeface - 1958 Sample

In 1957 Anderson was appointed chairman of the government committee formed to design signs for the new British motorway network. The objective was to produce signs that could be read at speed. Kinneir was commissioned as the designer. Kinneir and Calvert developed a new typeface for this commission, based on Akzidenz Grotesk. This typeface was later named Transport. It was first used for the Preston By-pass in 1958. The original road sign maquettes (models) produced by Kinneir and Calvert for a presentation to the Ministry of Transport are now held at the St Bride Library, a print and typographical library in London.

T. G. Usborne, the Ministry of Transport official in charge of the Anderson Committee, then formed a new committee under Sir Walter Worboys to review signage on all other British roads, in addition to motorways. In 1964 Kinneir made Margaret Calvert a partner and renamed his practice Kinneir Calvert Associates. The partnership devised a code of carefully chosen shapes and colours that largely complied with the protocol proposed by the 1949 UN World Conference on Road and Motor Transport.

Kinneir and Calvert then later completed other design projects. They introduced the Rail Alphabet typeface for British Rail. They also worked for hospitals, the Army and for other airports.
