= Road signs in South Korea =

Road signs in South Korea are regulated by the Korean Road Traffic Authority (Korean: 도로교통안전공단).

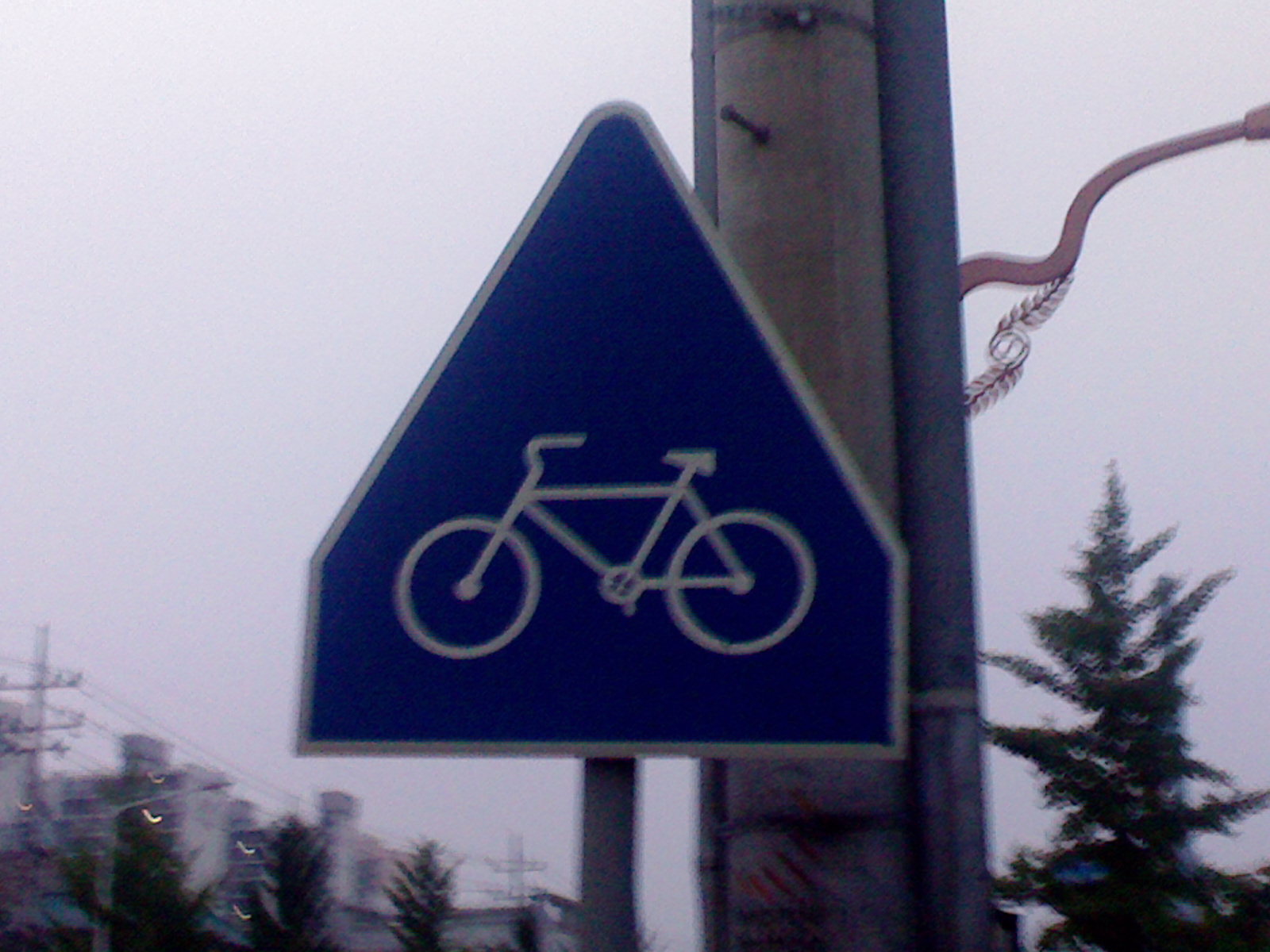
Sign for a bicycle crossing

Signs indicating dangers are triangular with a red border, yellow background and black pictograms. Mandatory instructions are white on a blue background, prohibitions are black on a white background with a red border, and supplementary information signs are rectangular with black text on a white background. Like other countries, the signs use pictograms to display their meaning. Any text included in signs will normally be in Korean and English. Signs are normally placed 1 to 2.1 meters high.

South Korean road signs depict people with realistic (as opposed to stylized) silhouettes.

Road signs in South Korea closely followed Japanese and European rules on road signs until the 1970s.

South Korea signed the Vienna Convention on Road Signs and Signals on December 29, 1969, but has yet to ratify the Convention.

== Signs standard ==
=== Road signs color ===
Color type	Color number	Color	Note
Deep red	7.5R 3/10		Based on the color of Korean Industrial Standards (KS A 0062, KS M 6020) (within allowable value △ E=1)
Yellow orange	10YR 7/14		Based on the color of Korean Industrial Standards (KS A 0062, KS M 6020) (within allowable value △ E=1)
Dark green	2.5G 3/6		Based on the color of Korean Industrial Standards (KS A 0062, KS M 6020) (within allowable value △ E=1)
Black and navy	7.5PB 2/2		Based on the color of Korean Industrial Standards (KS A 0062, KS M 6020) (within allowable value △ E=1)
White	N 9.25		Based on the color of Korean Industrial Standards (KS A 0062, KS M 6020) (within allowable value △ E=1)
Black	N 1.5		Based on the color of Korean Industrial Standards (KS A 0062, KS M 6020) (within allowable value △ E=1)

=== Road surface marking color ===
Color type	Color number	Color	Note
White	N 9.25		Within the allowable value △ E = 1, it is a standard for color paint according to Korean Industrial Standards (KSA 0062, KSM 6080)
Yellow orange	10YR 7/14		Within the allowable value △ E = 1, it is a standard for color paint according to Korean Industrial Standards (KSA 0062, KSM 6080)
Bright blue	10B 6/8		Within the allowable value △ E = 1, it is a standard for color paint according to Korean Industrial Standards (KSA 0062, KSM 6080)
Deep red	7.5R 3/10		Within the allowable value △ E = 1, it is a standard for color paint according to Korean Industrial Standards (KSA 0062, KSM 6080)

== Warning signs ==
Warning signs are triangular with yellow backgrounds, red borders and black pictograms.

Crossroad

T-shaped intersection

Y-shaped intersection

Intersection to right

Intersection to left

Priority junction

Traffic merge from right

Traffic merge from left

Traffic circle / Roundabout

Railway crossing

Trams crossing

Right curve

Left curve

Double bend, the first to the right

Double bend, the first to the left

Two-way traffic

Ascending hill (10%)

Descending hill (10%)

Narrow carriageway

Right lane decrease / End of right crawler lane

Left lane decrease / End of left crawler lane

Keep right

Pass left or right

Start of dual carriageway

End of dual carriageway

Traffic lights

Slippery road

Riverside road (quayside or river bank)

Bumpy road

Speed humps

Falling rocks

Crosswalk (pedestrian crossing)

Children crossing

Bicycles

Roadworks

Airplanes

Crosswind

Tunnel

Bridge

Wild animals crossing

Other dangers

Traffic queues

== Prohibition signs ==
Prohibition signs are round with white backgrounds, red borders and black pictograms.

Road closed

No motor vehicles

No trucks

No buses

No motorcycles and mopeds

No personal mobility devices

No motor vehicles, motorcycles and mopeds

No rotary tillers, tractors or handcarts

No bicycles

No entry

No straight ahead

No right turn

No left turn

No U-turn

No overtaking

No stopping or parking

No parking

Maximum weight limit (5.5t)

Height limit (3.5m)

Maximum width limit (2.2m)

Minimum safe distance between vehicles (50m)

Maximum speed limit (50km/h)

Minimum speed limit (30km/h)

Slow

Stop

Yield

No pedestrians

No vehicles carrying dangerous substances / explosives

== Mandatory instruction signs ==
Mandatory instruction signs are round with blue backgrounds and white pictograms.

Motor Vehicles Only

Bicycles Only

Bicycles and Pedestrians Only

Trams Only

Traffic circle / Roundabout

Straight

Right Turn

Left Turn

Straight and Right Turn

Straight and Left Turn

Left Turn and Right Turn

U-Turn

Pass Left or Right

Pass Right

Pass Left

Follow Directions

Diversion / Detour

Bicycle Ped Division

Bicycle only

Parking Lot

Bicycle Parking Lot

Pedestrians Only

Crosswalk (Pedestrian crossing)

Senior citizens crossing (In the Silver zone)

Children crossing (In the School zone)

Disabled people crossing (In the Disabled people zone)

Bicycles crossing

One Way

One Way

One Way

Left Turn No Signal

Bus only Lane

Tram only Lane

HOV Lane

The traffic moving in the direction of the white arrow is given priority

Allow bicycle side-by-side

city

== Supplementary signs ==
Supplementary signs are rectangular with white backgrounds and black text. Most of signs are only written in Korean.

District (Whole Downtown)

Date (Sundays and holidays excepted)

Time

Time (Parking permitted up to 1 hour)

Traffic light status (When the red light turned on)

Road priority (Priority road ahead)

Safe speed (30 km/h)

Weather condition (Foggy area)

Road condition (When snow or rain falls)

Traffic control (Get in lane)

Traffic regulation (Do not cross)

Vehicles limitation (Sedans only)

Sign explanation (258m long tunnel)

End

Tow-away zone

== Direction and distance signs ==
Direction and distance signs are rectangular with dark green backgrounds and white text. In urban areas, direction signs have dark blue backgrounds. The signs are normally written in Korean and English. In March 2010, Korea Expressway Corporation introduced a new technique of direction signing for expressways. This new system focuses on providing signs featuring destinations reached from an exit, rather than those reached by remaining on the mainline. Notably, the Korean typeface has changed from Sandol Doropyojipanche (Sandol traffic sign typeface, which can be seen on the distance sign and direction sign below) to Hangilche (Hangil typeface), and the Panno typeface has been introduced for Latin text.

Motorway

End of motorway

Motorways end point announcement sign
Distance sign

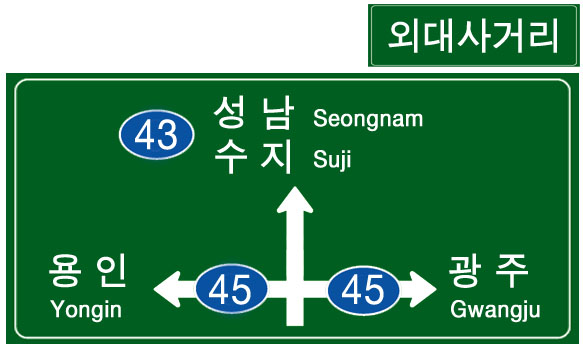
Direction sign (with name of junction)

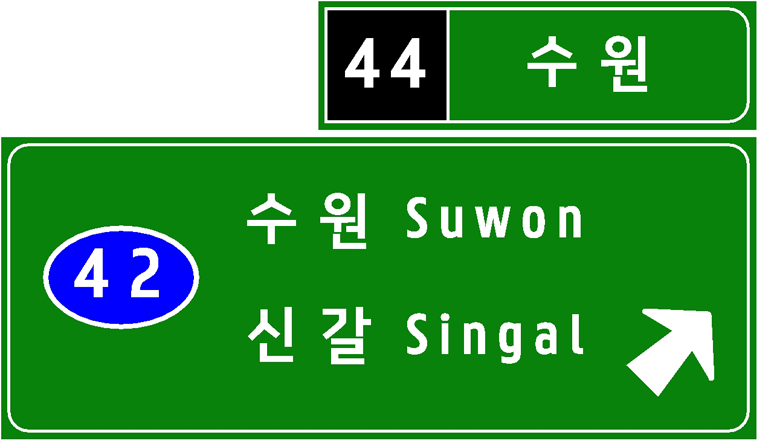
New expressway direction sign (introduced in early 2010)

== Obsolete signs ==
Priority junction

Standing water splashes (Deleted on September 28, 2007)

Bicycles

No entry

No crossing traffic (Deleted on September 28, 2007)

No stopping or parking

No parking

Stop

Motor Vehicles Only

Mandatory use of snow tires or chains (Deleted on September 28, 2007)

Safety zone

Safety zone (Deleted on September 28, 2007)

Pedestrians Only

Crosswalk (Pedestrian crossing)

Crosswalk (School crossing)

Crosswalk (School crossing)

End

== Other signs ==
Asian Highway route shield

Expressway route shield

National Highway route shield

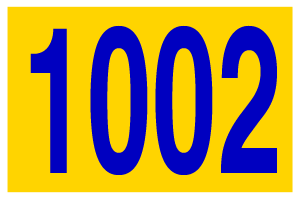
Local highway route shield

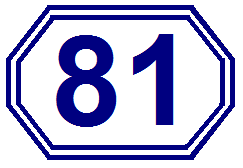
Urban Road route shield

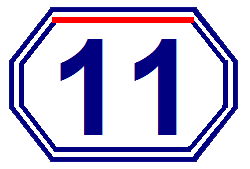
Urban expressway route shield

== Road surface marking ==
Center Line

U-turn

Lanes

Bus-only lane

Tram-only lane

Border

No Lane Change

Lane Change2

Lane Change3

Obstacle 1

Obstacle 2

No turn right

No turn left

512 No straight ahead

No turn left and right

No U-turn

No parking

No stop and parking

Speed limit

Speed limit children (30km/h)

Slow down

Slow no parking

Stop

Yield

Parking parallel

Parking rectangular

Parking diagonal

No standing zone

Roundabout line

Roundabout intersection

Roundabout 4 direction

Roundabout 2 direction

Crosswalk ahead

Stop line

Safety zone

Crosswalk

Crosswalk 2

Bicycle cross

Bicycle-only lane

School ahead

Proceeding direction

Proceeding direction 2

Proceeding direction 3

Proceeding direction local

Proceeding right local

Left turn no signal

Change lane

Up hill

== Traffic Lights ==
Horizontal lights

Horizontal with arrows lights

Vertical lights

Vertical with arrows lights

Bicycles lights

Vertical with 3 bicycles lights

Pedestrians lights

Lights caution

Lights reversible and lane

== Photographs ==
=== Warning signs ===
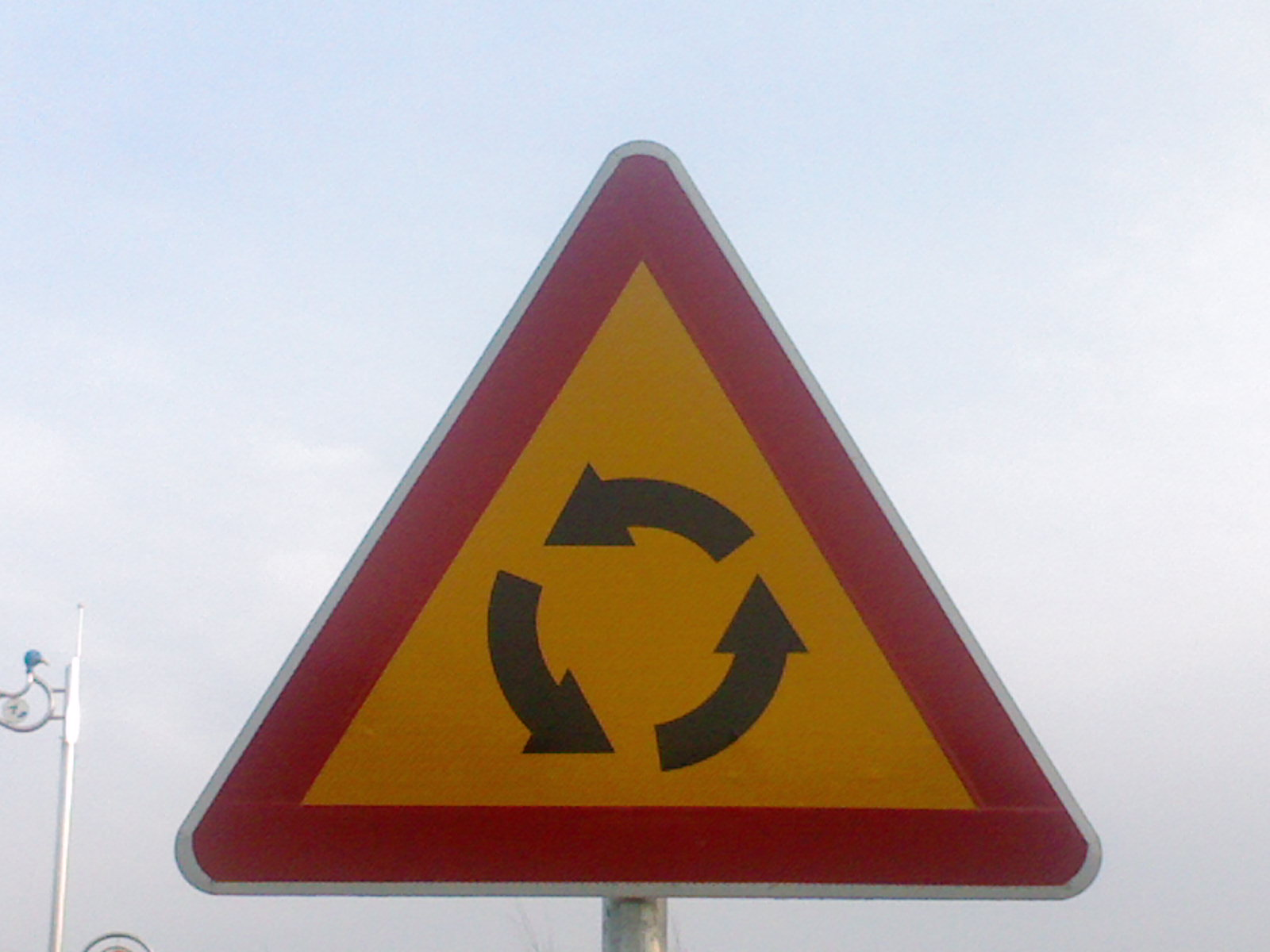
Roundabout

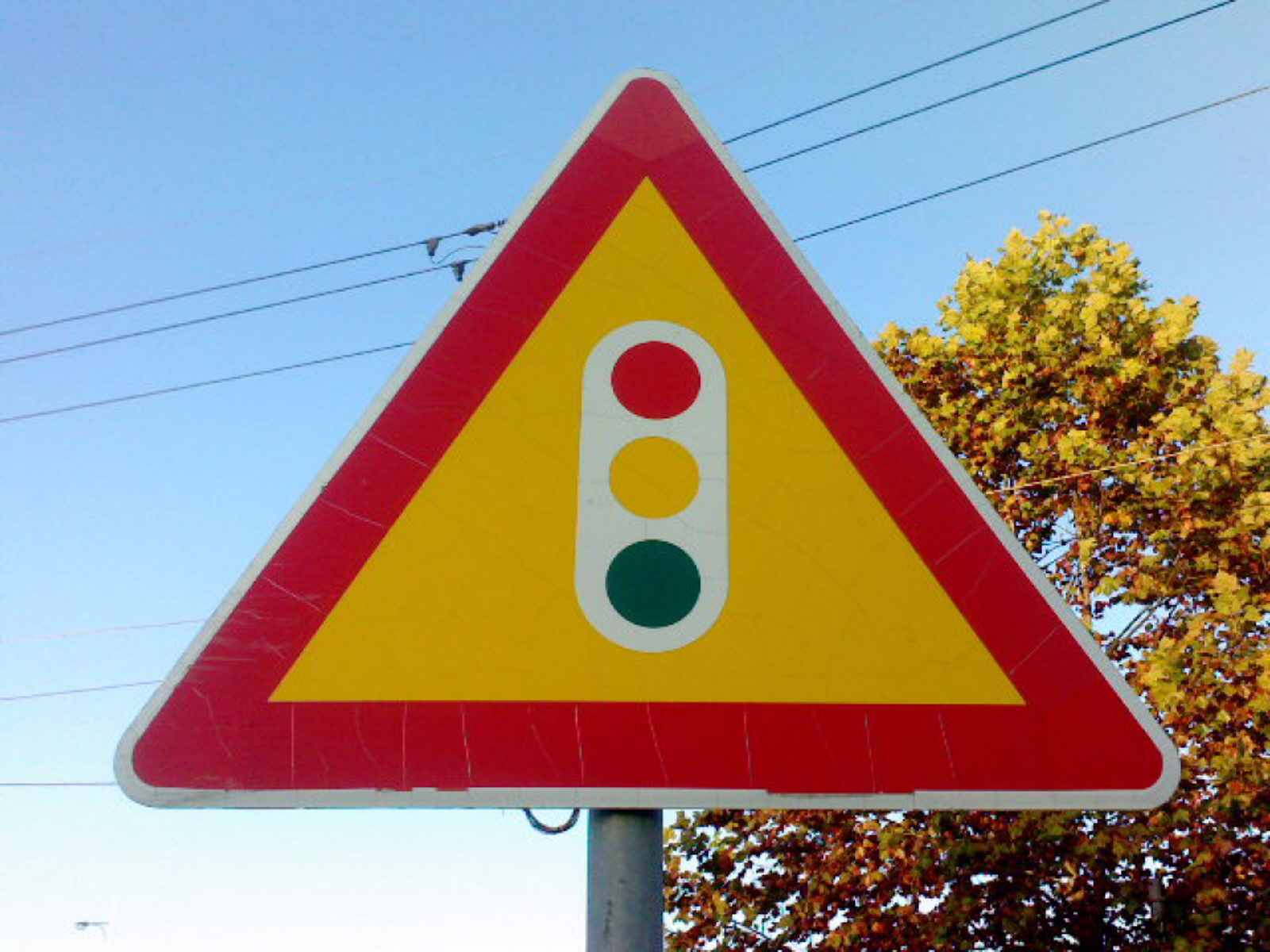
Traffic light

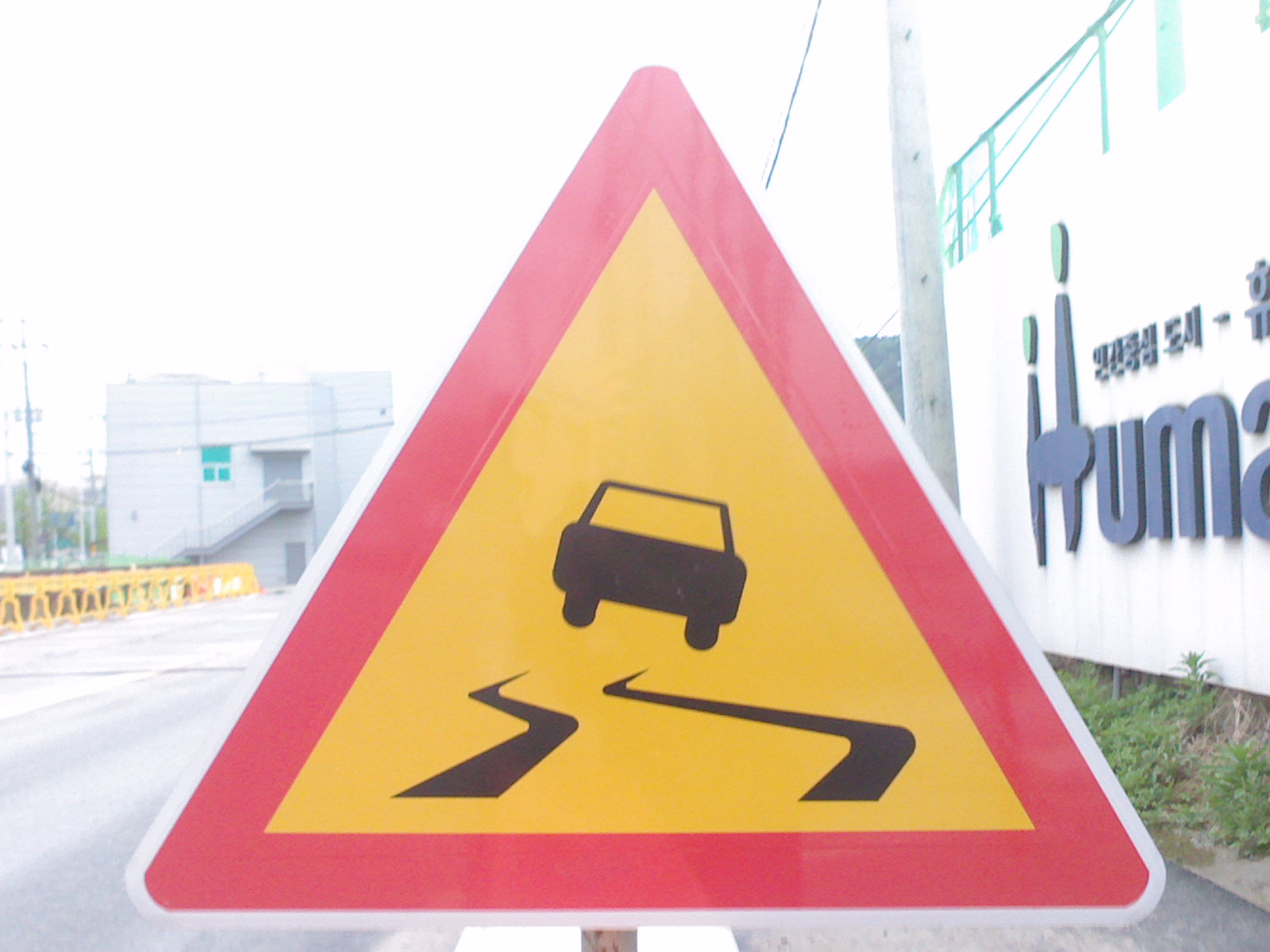
Slippery road

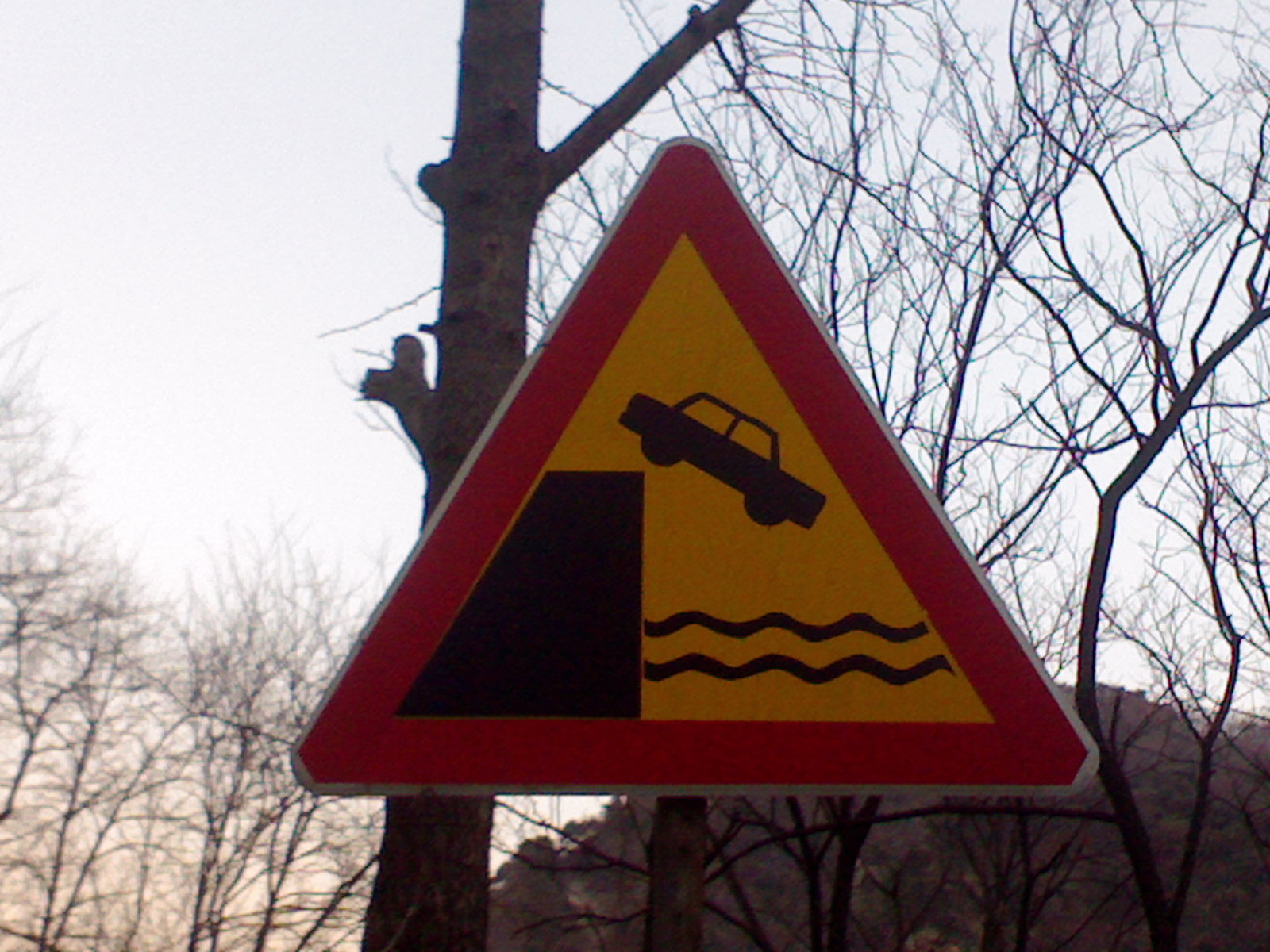
Quay or riverbank

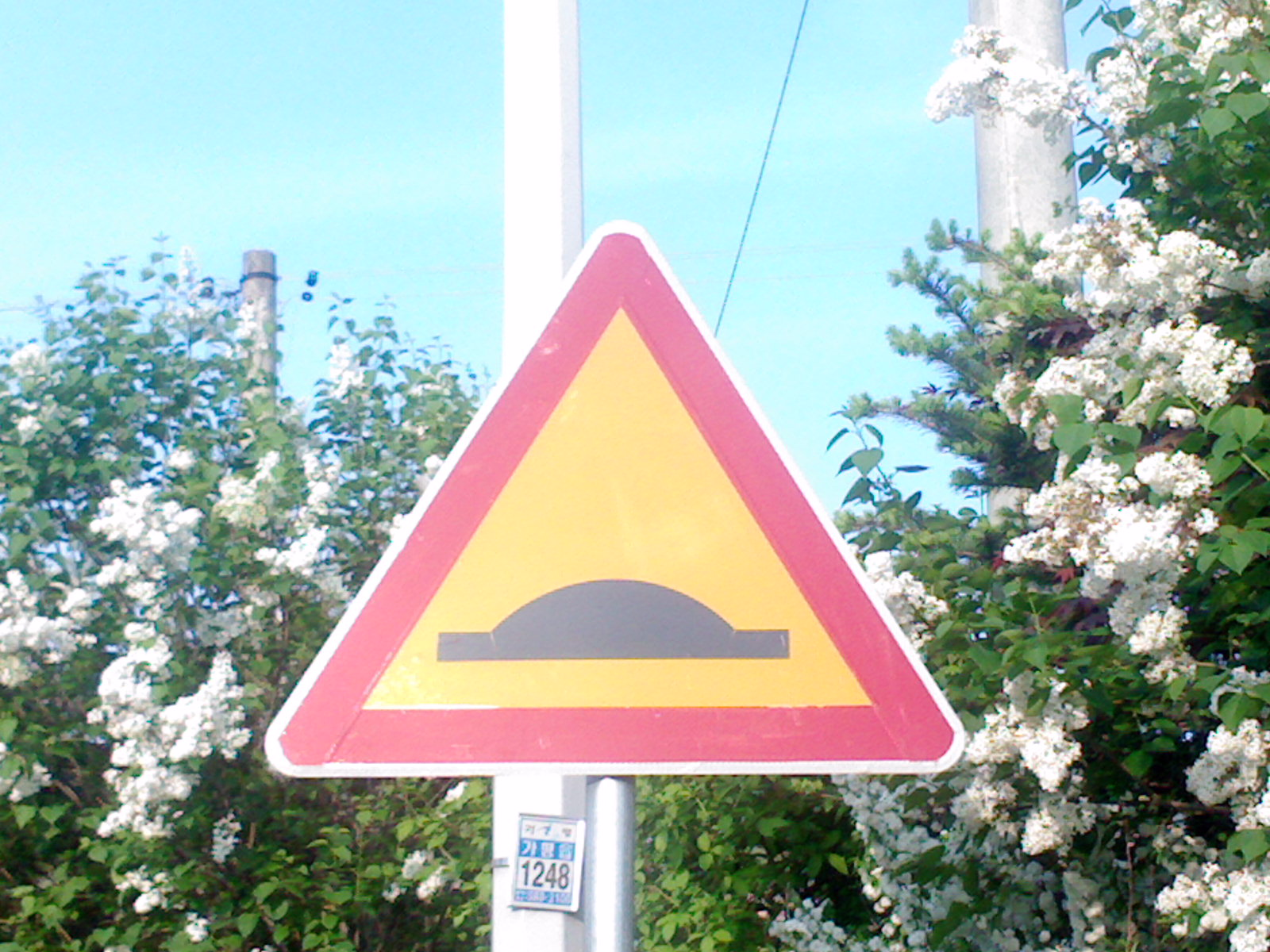
Speed bump

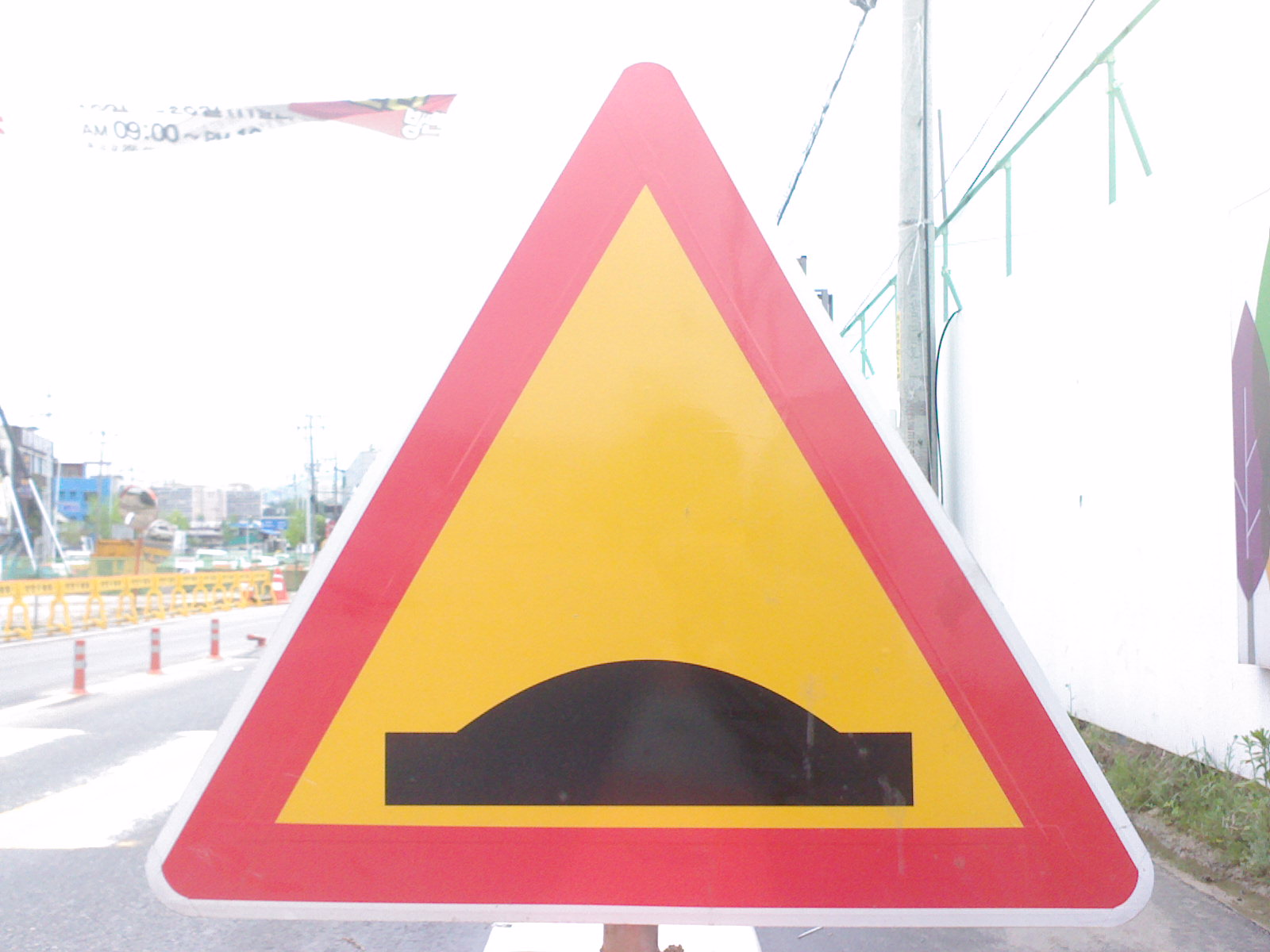
Speed bump

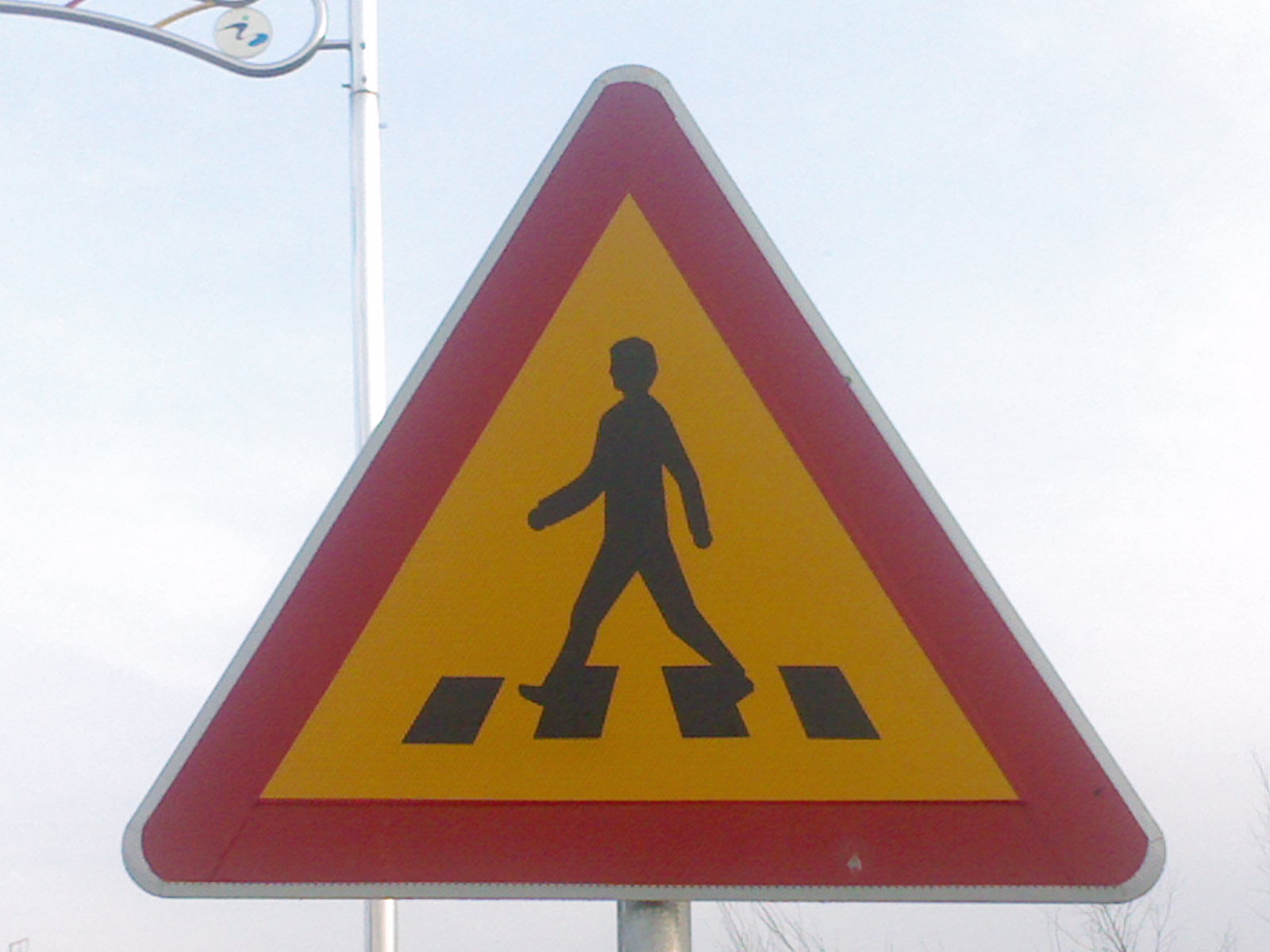
Crosswalk

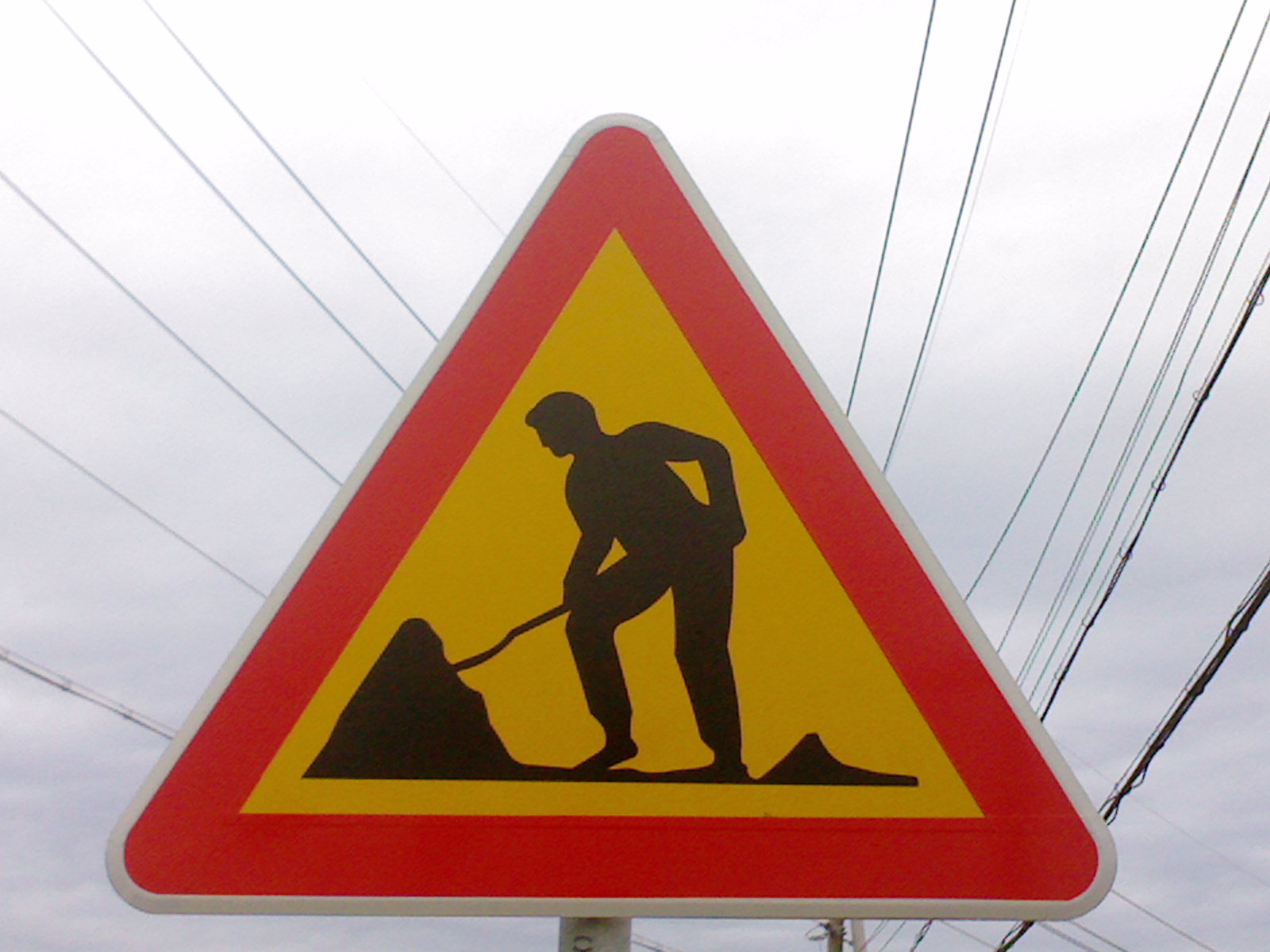
Road works

=== Prohibition signs ===
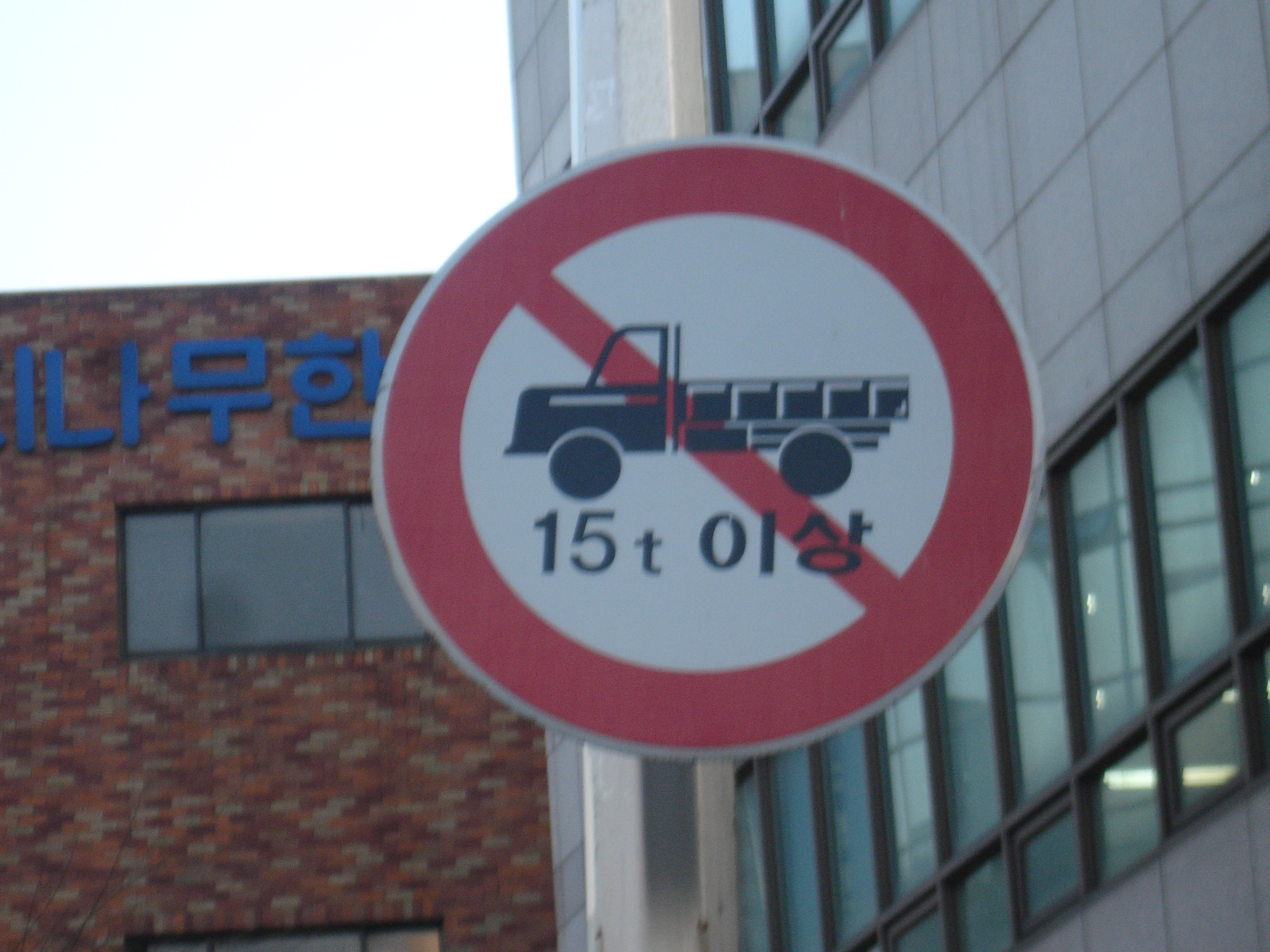
No trucks over 15 tonnes permitted

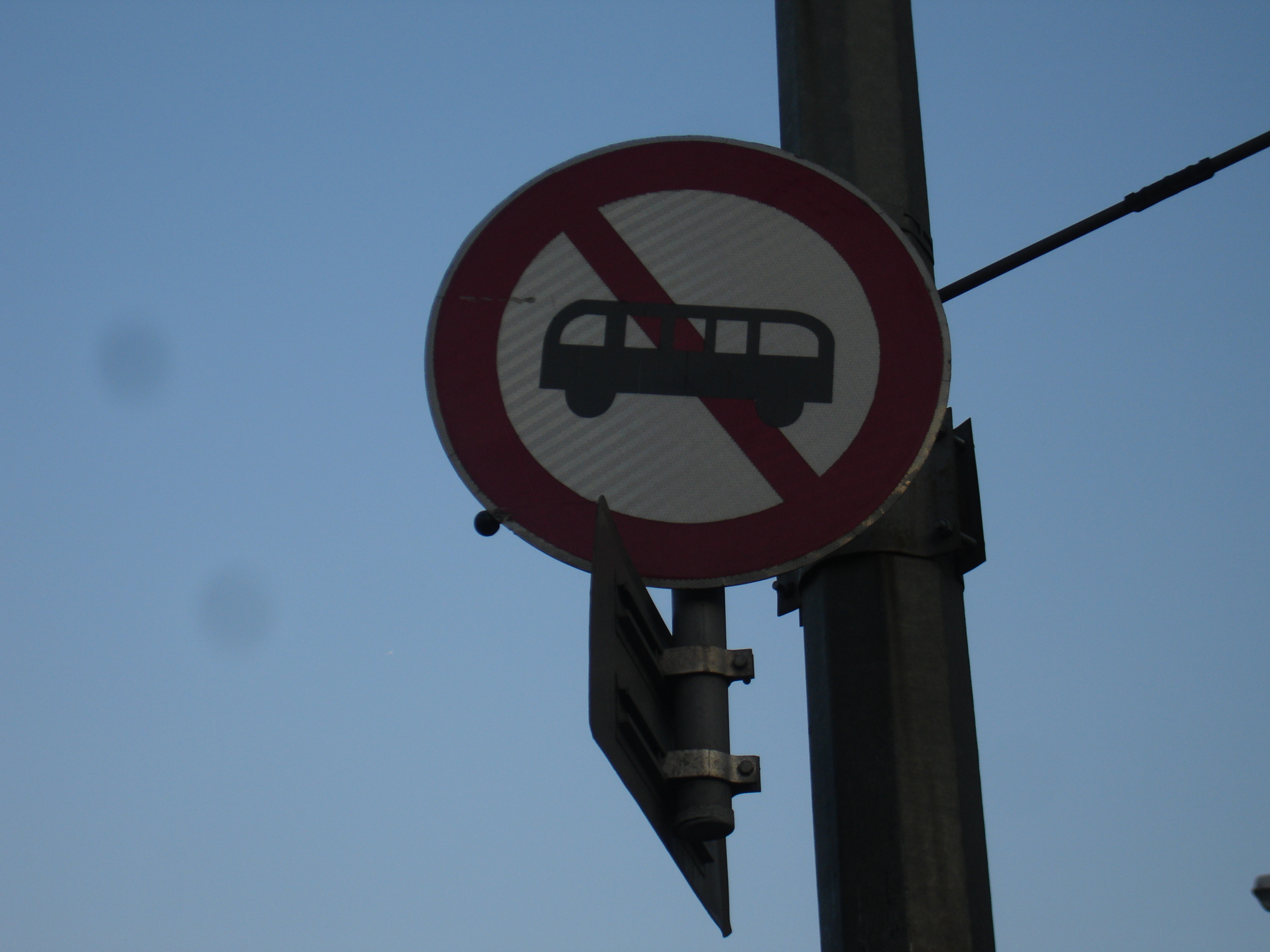
Buses prohibited

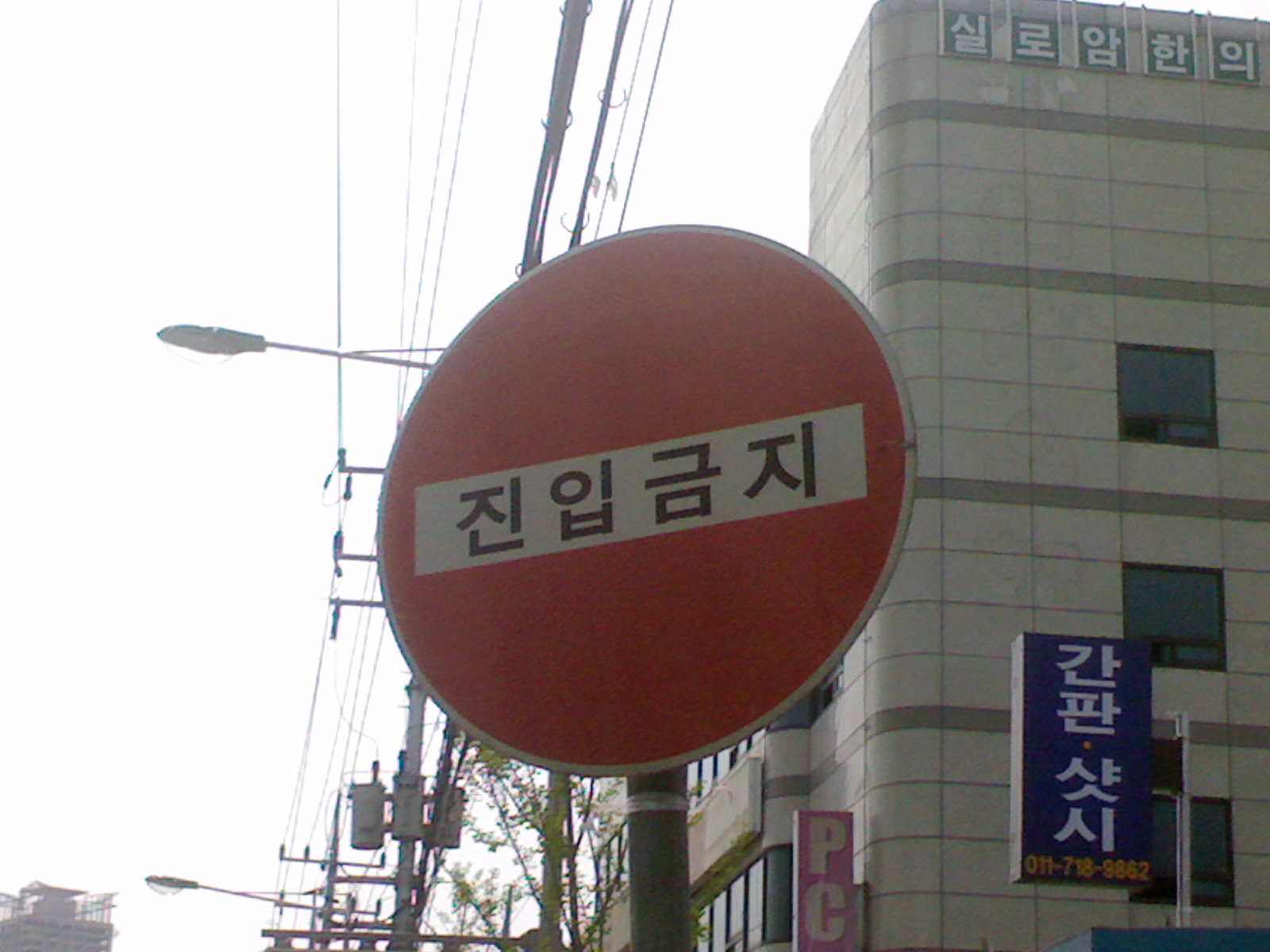
Do Not Enter

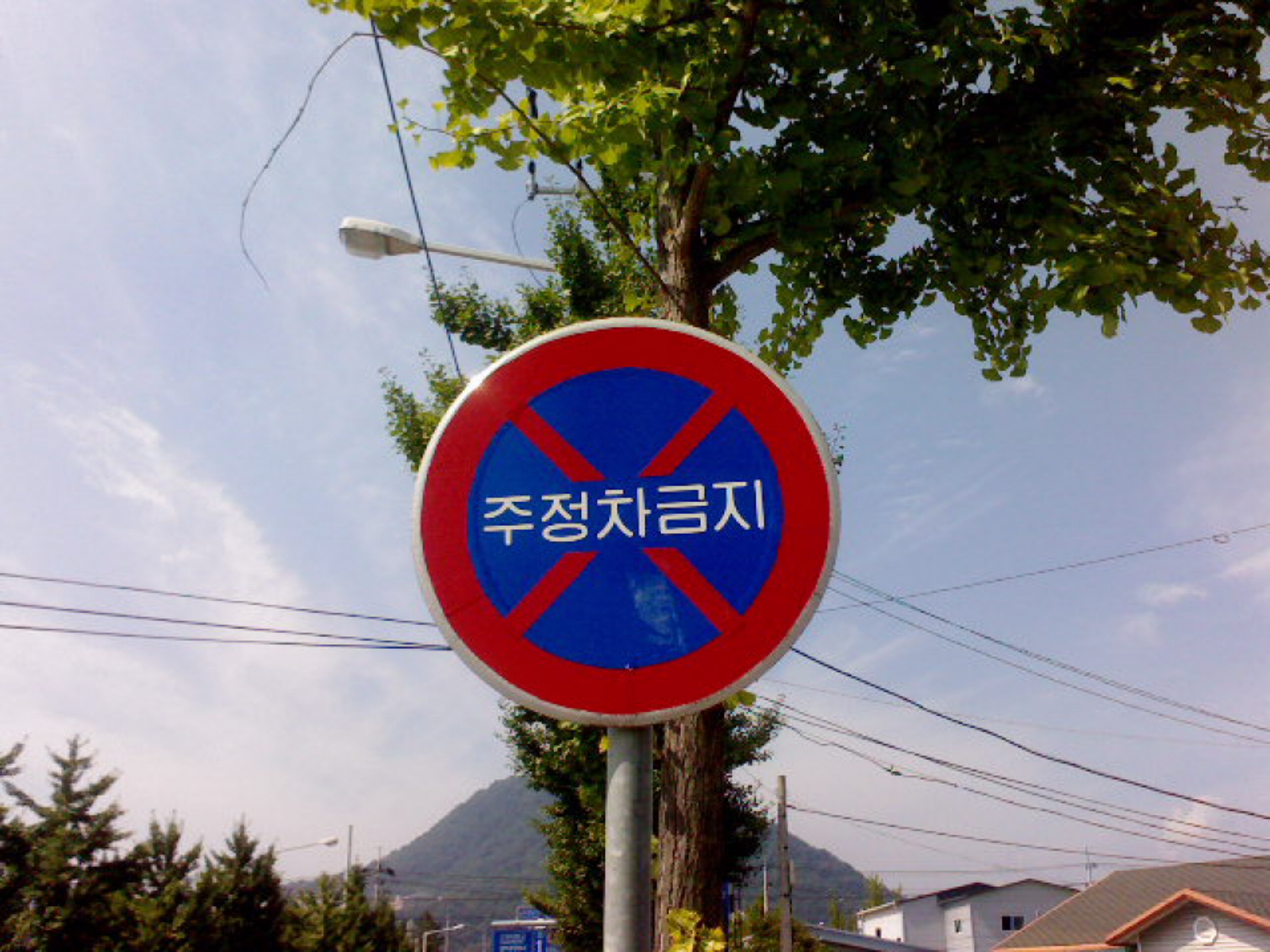
No Parking

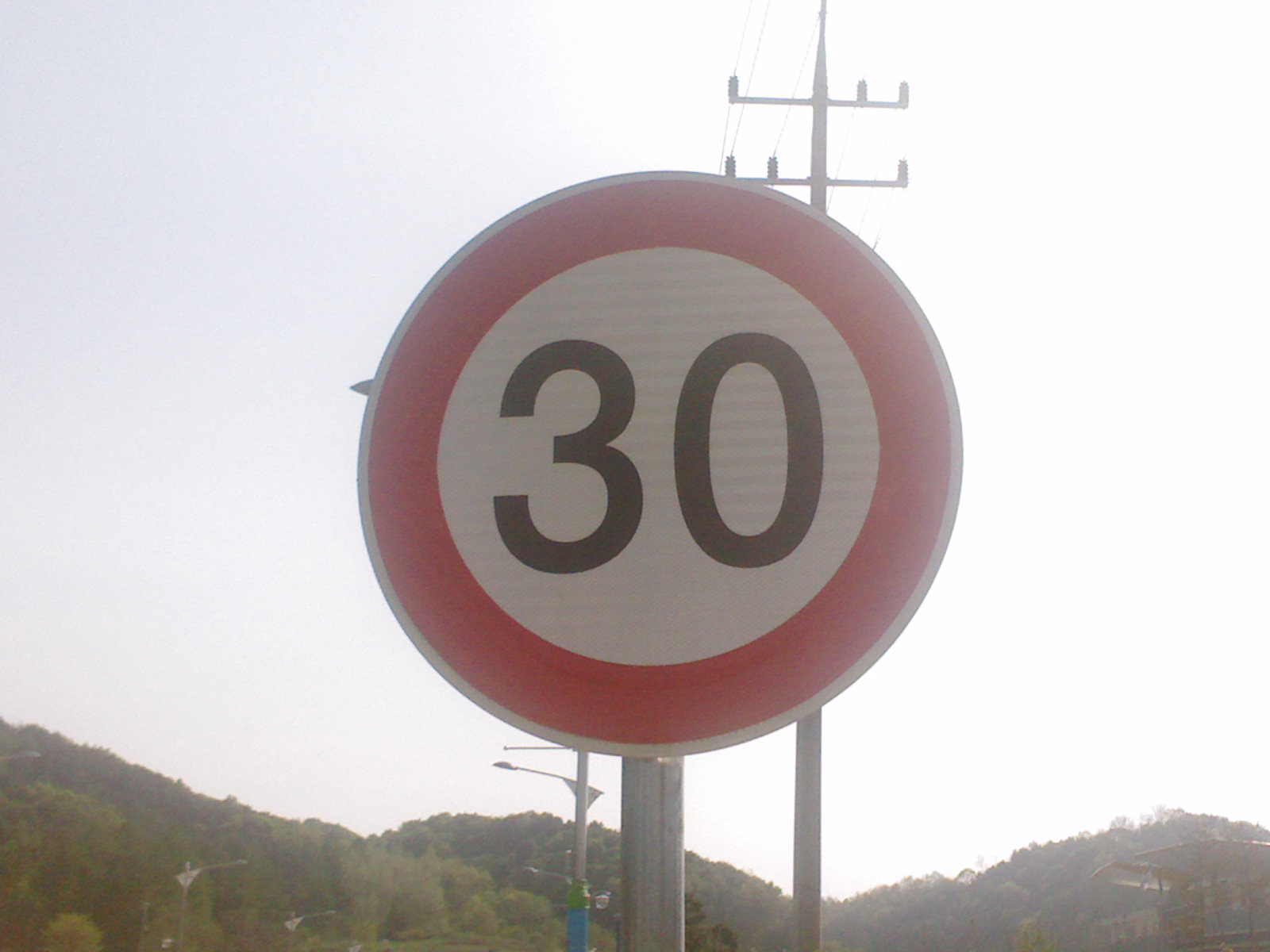
Maximum Speed Limit (30km/h)

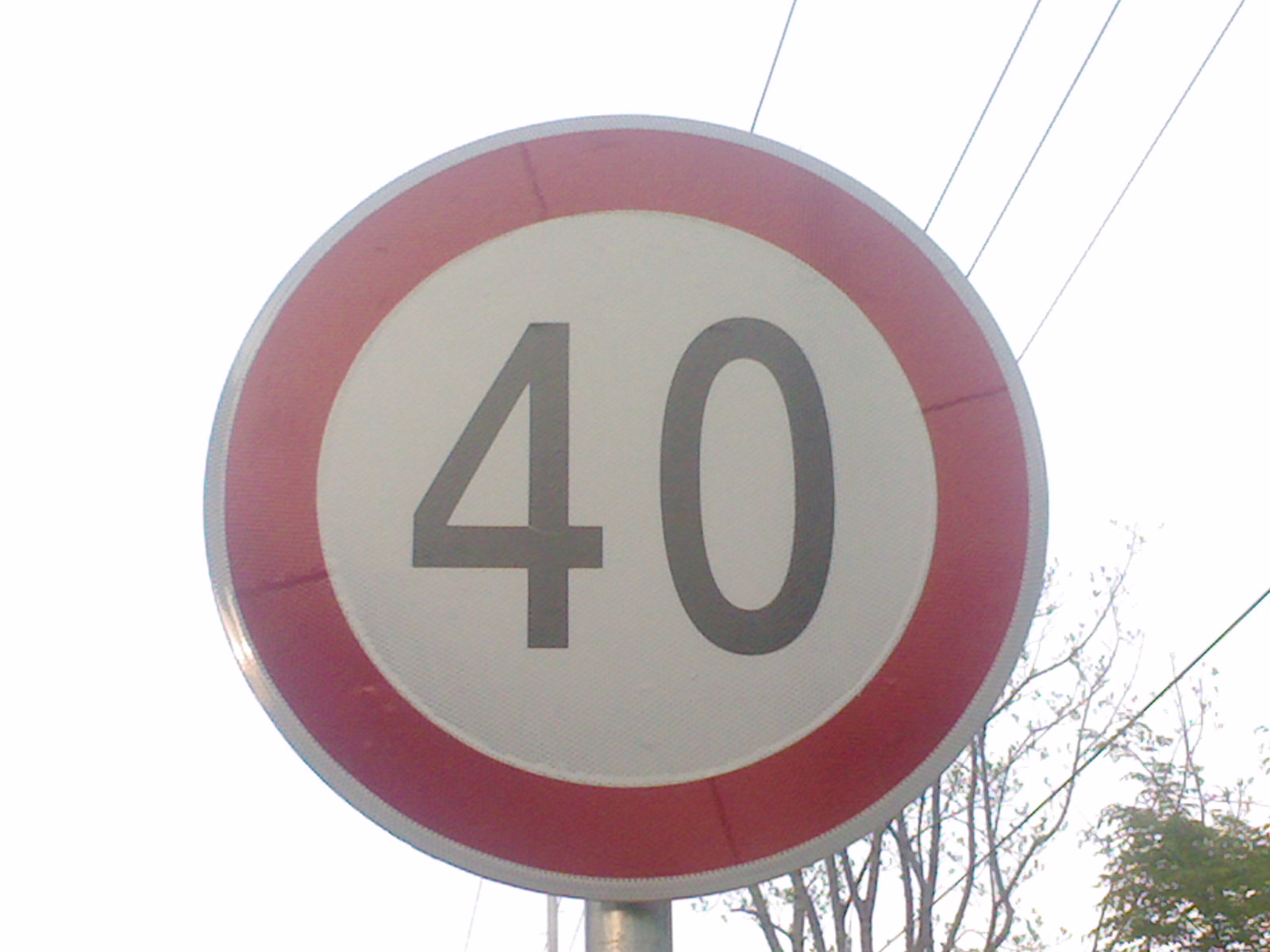
Maximum Speed Limit (40km/h)

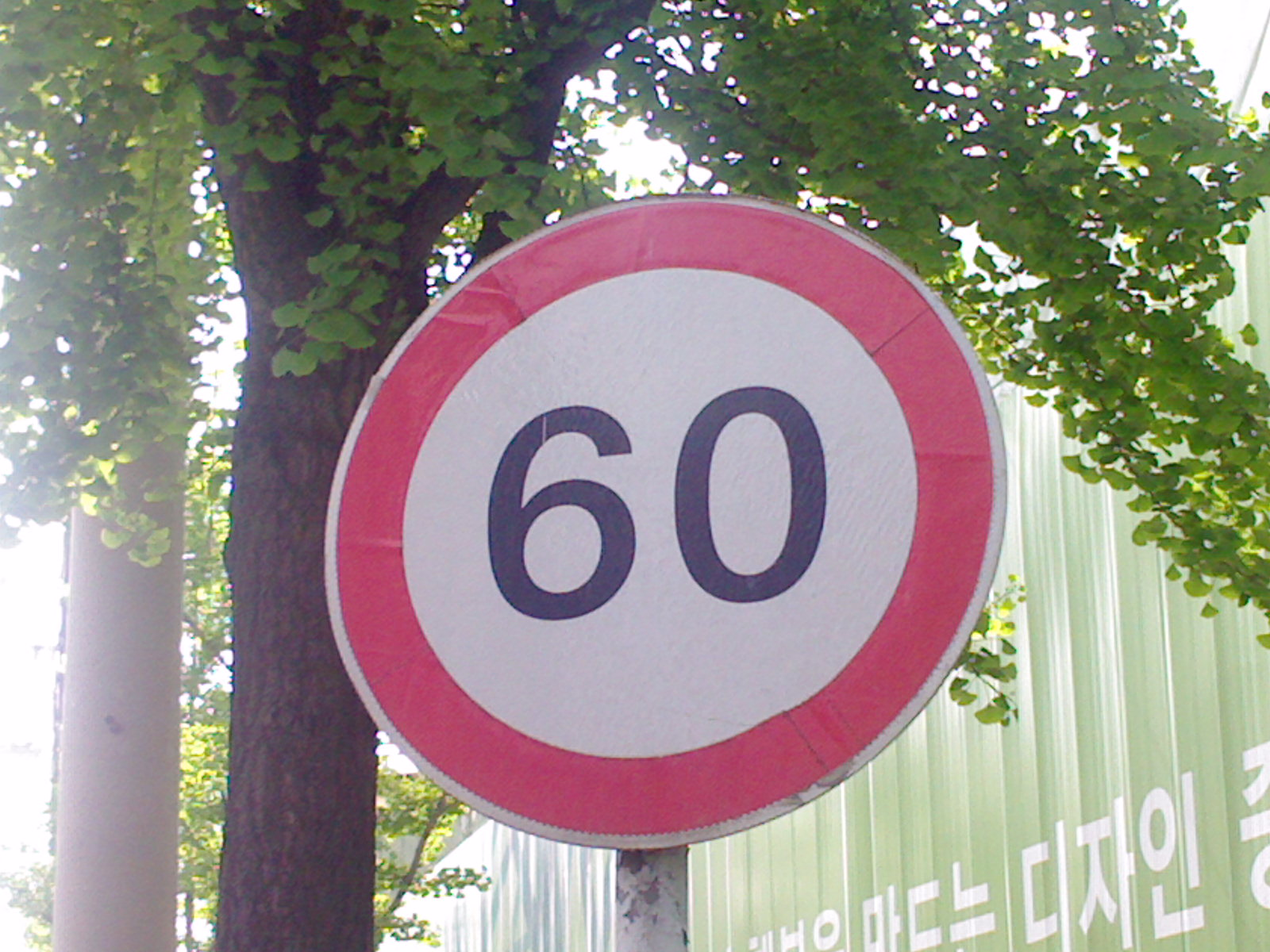
Maximum Speed Limit (60km/h)

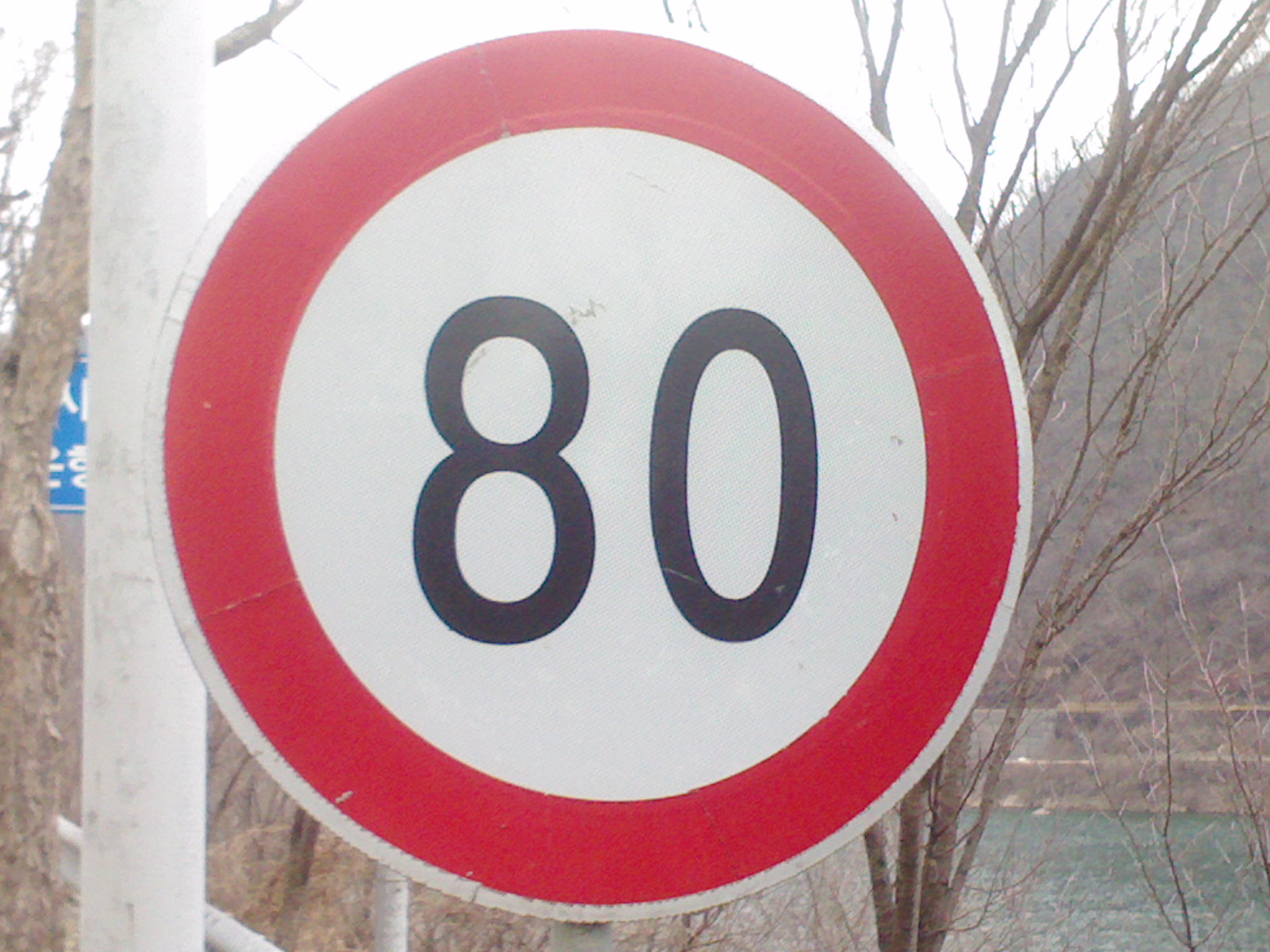
Maximum Speed Limit (80km/h)

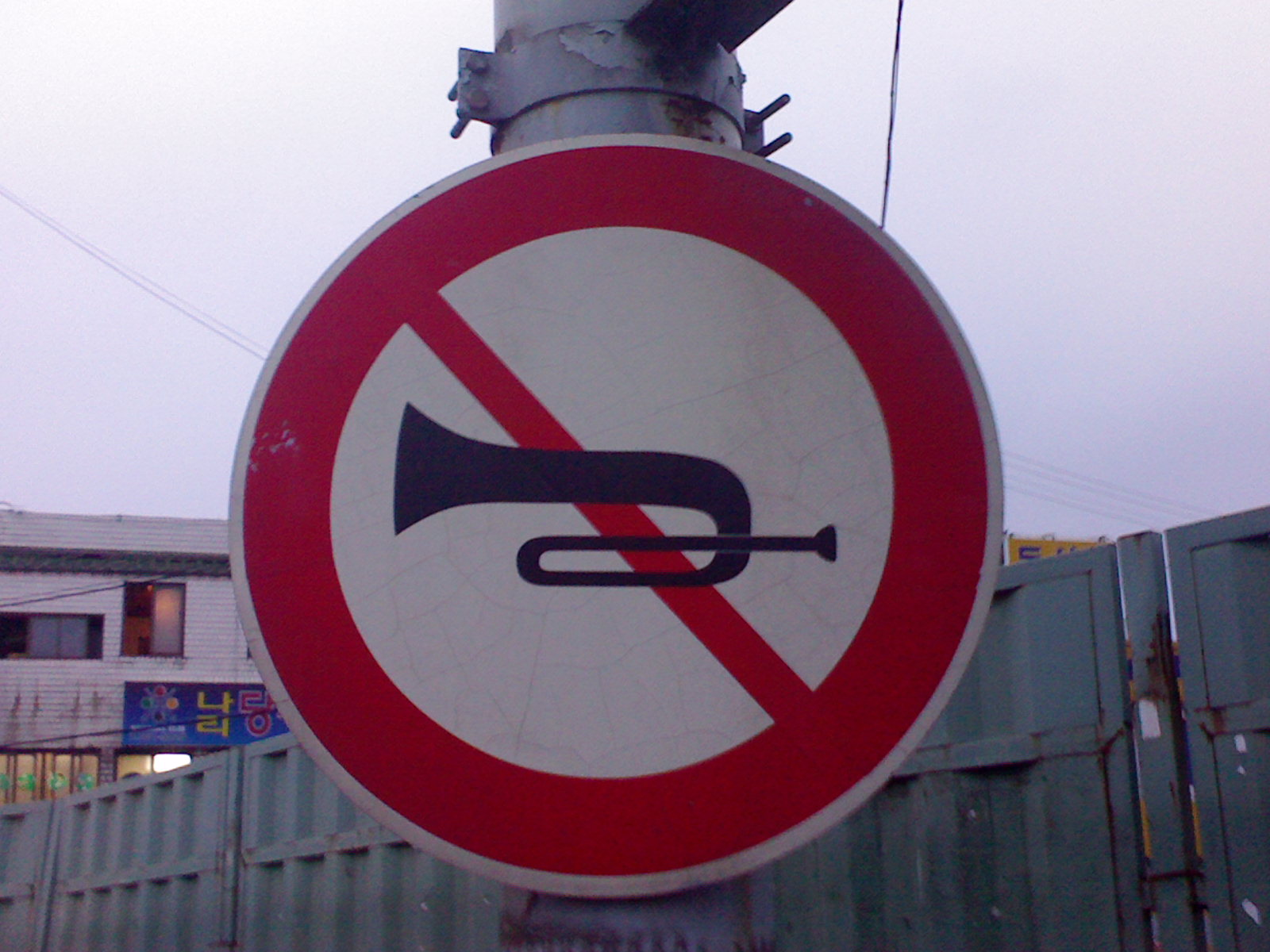
Do Not Use Horn

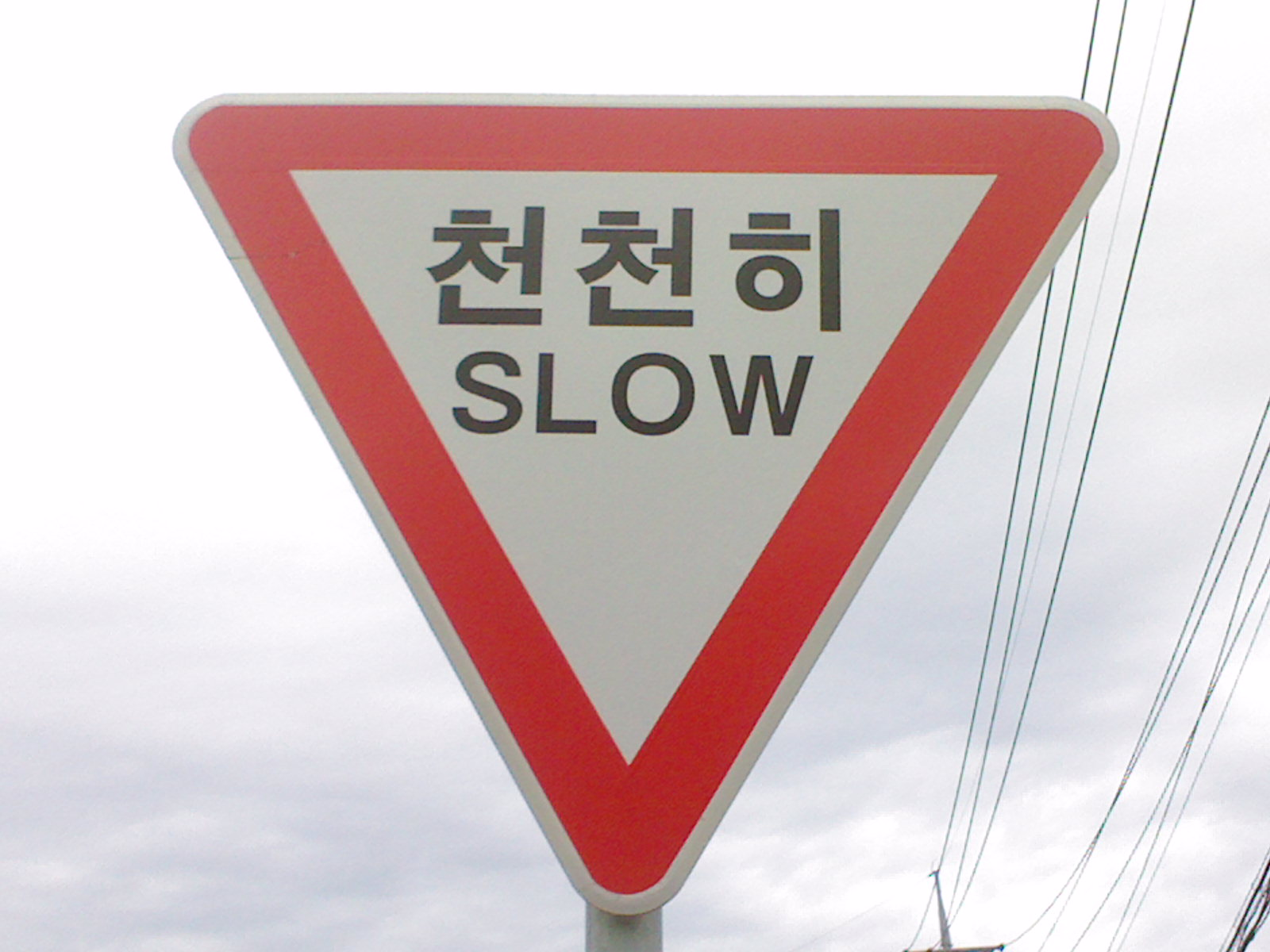
Slow down

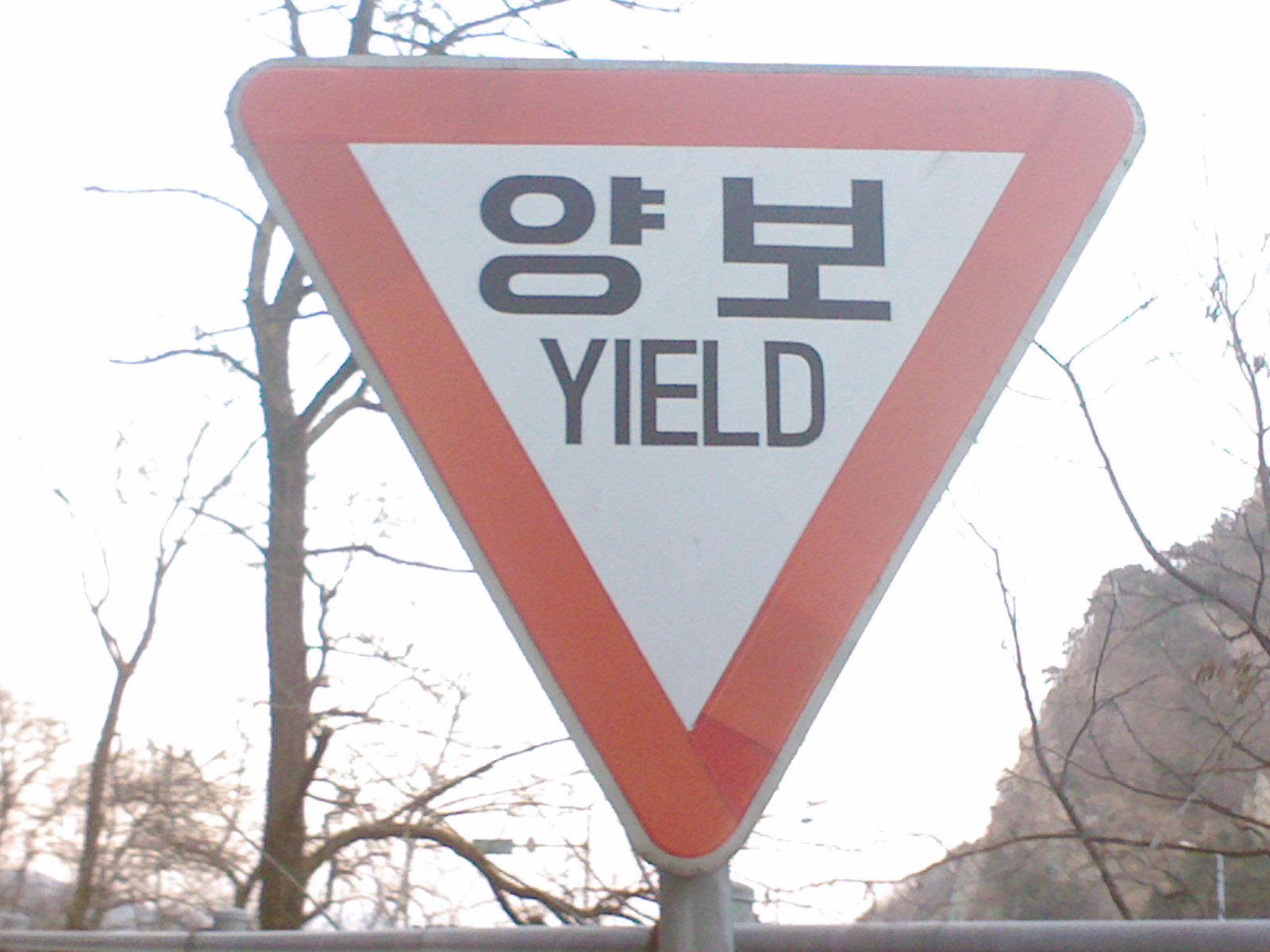
Yield sign

=== Mandatory instruction sign ===
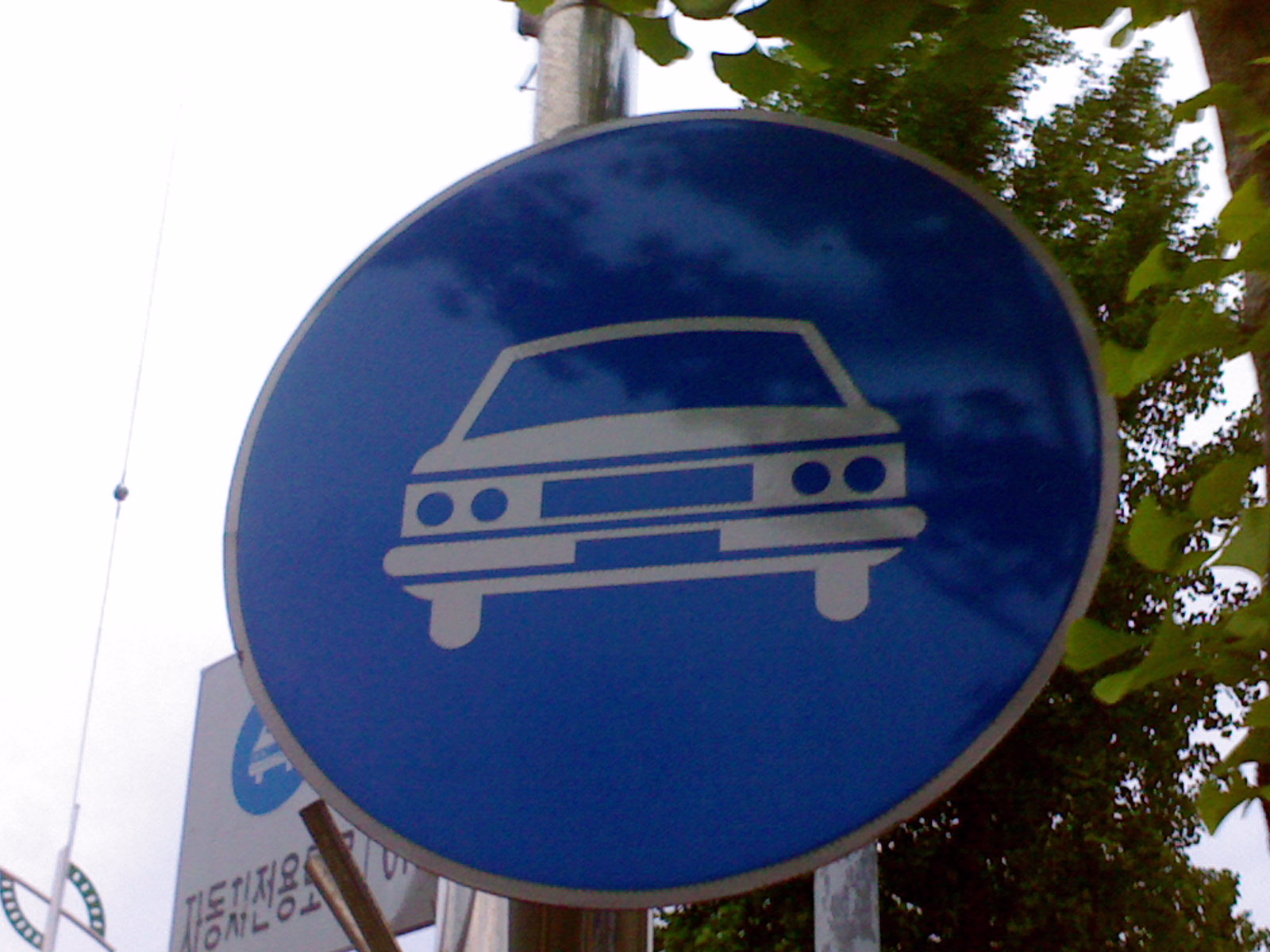
Motor vehicles only

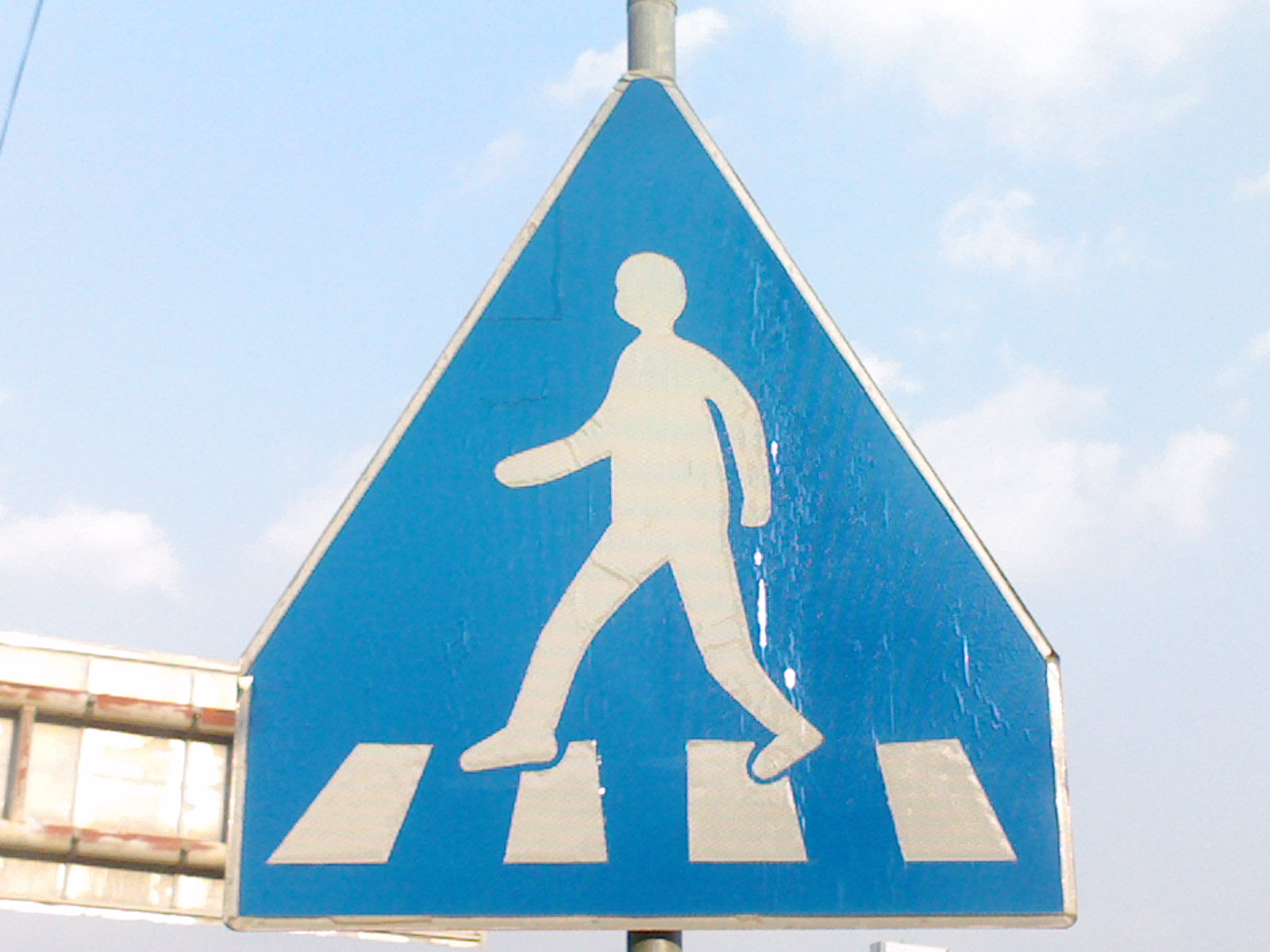
Crosswalk

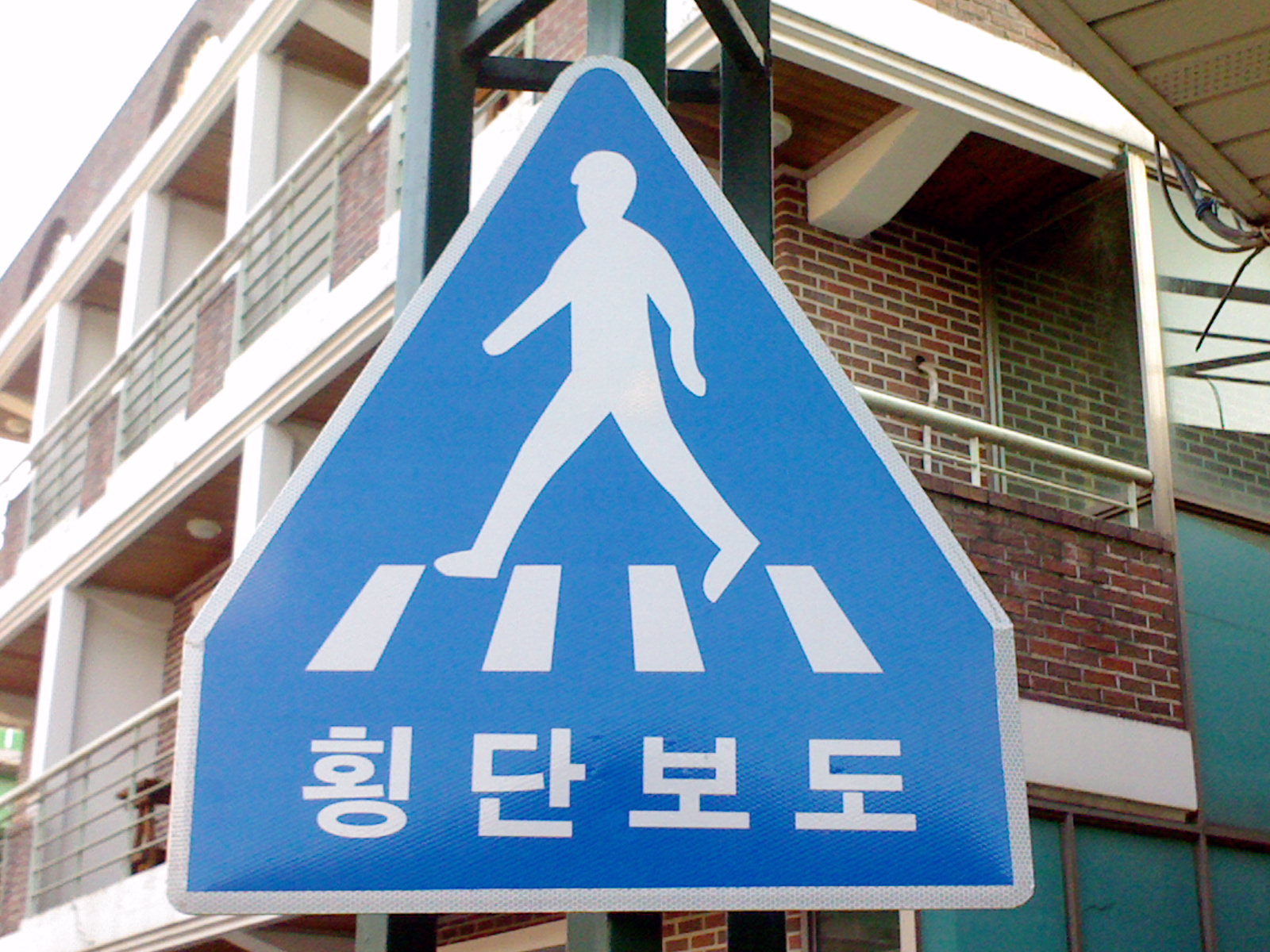
Crosswalk

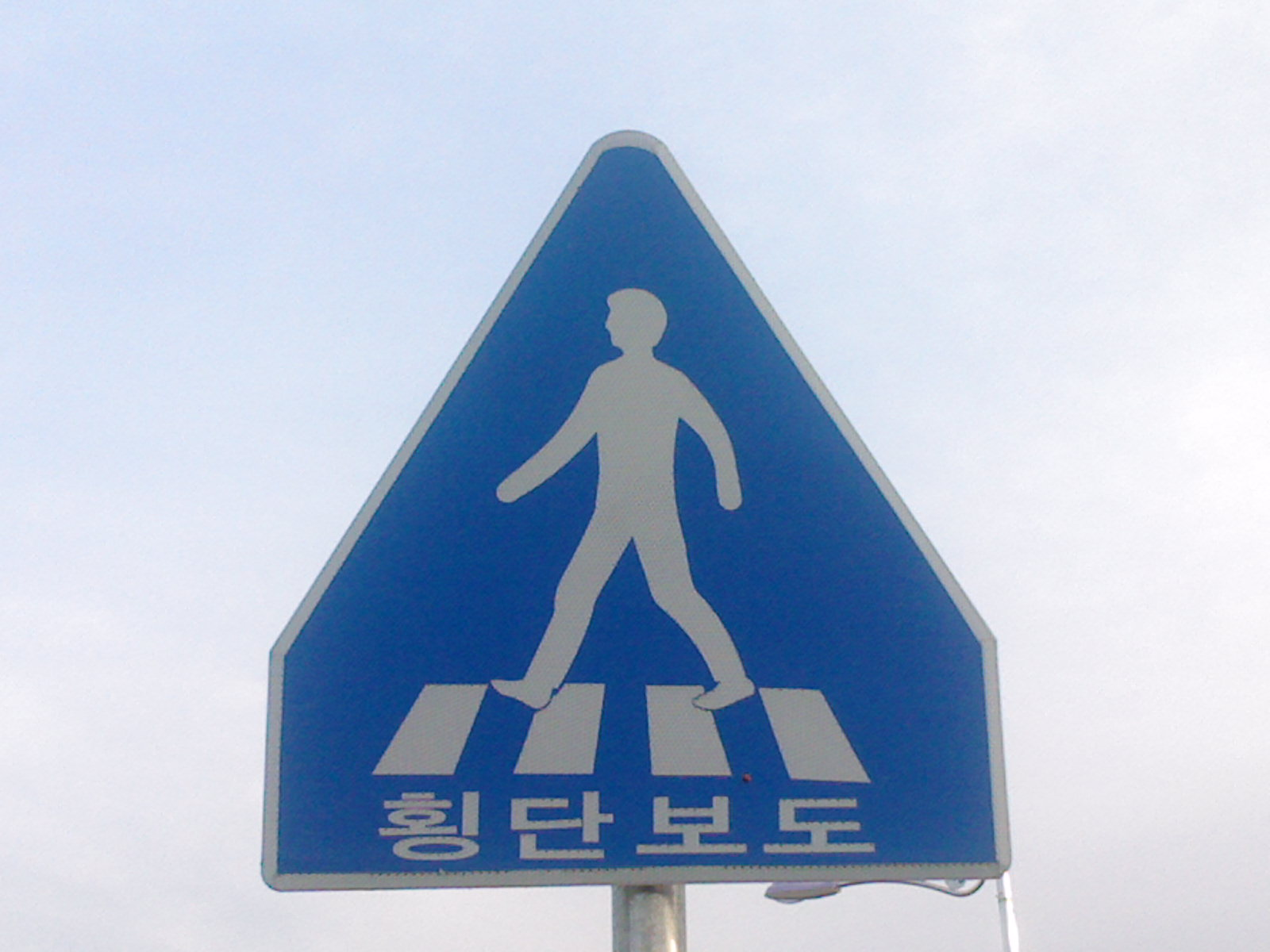
Crosswalk

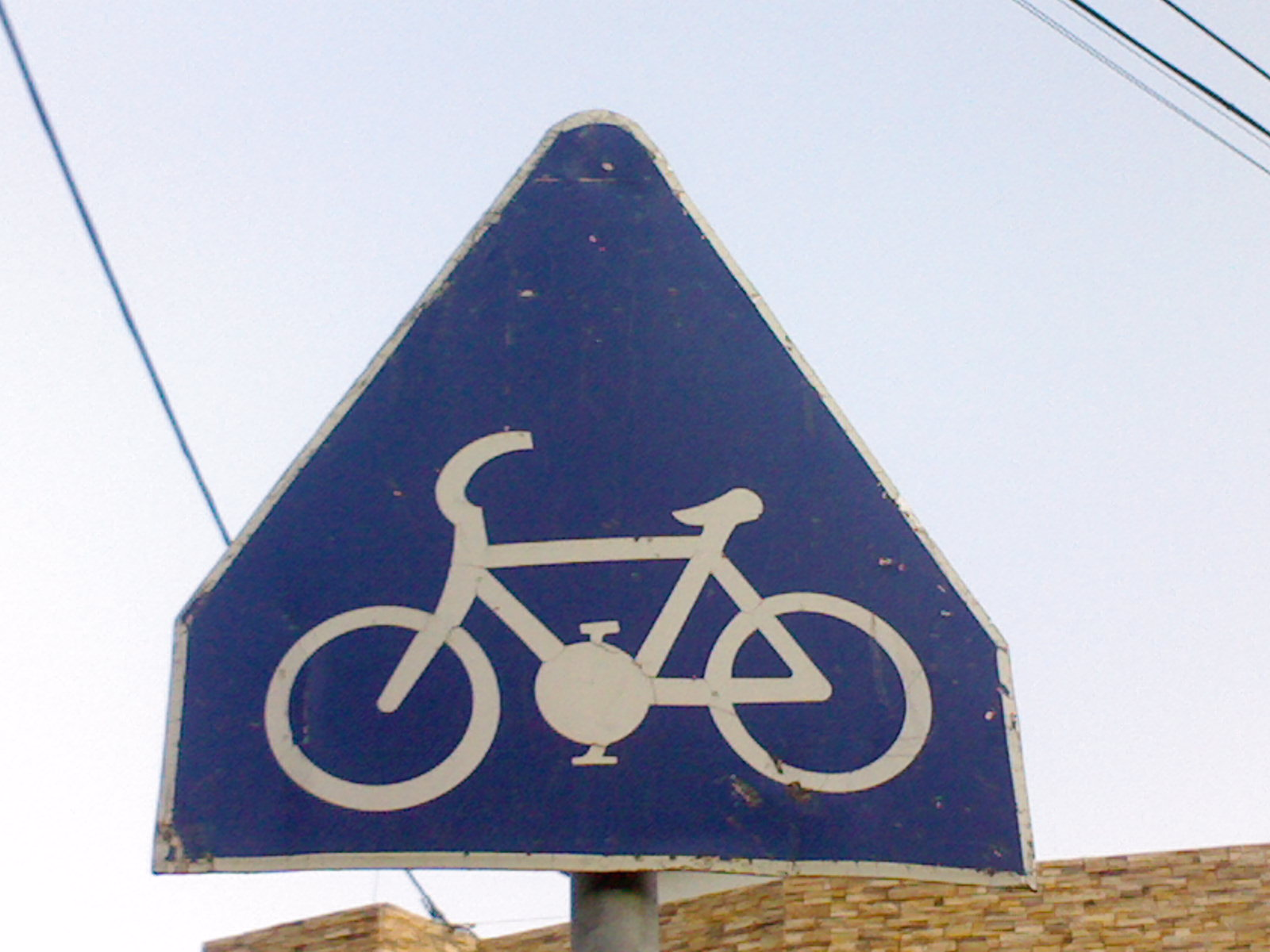
Bicycle Crossing

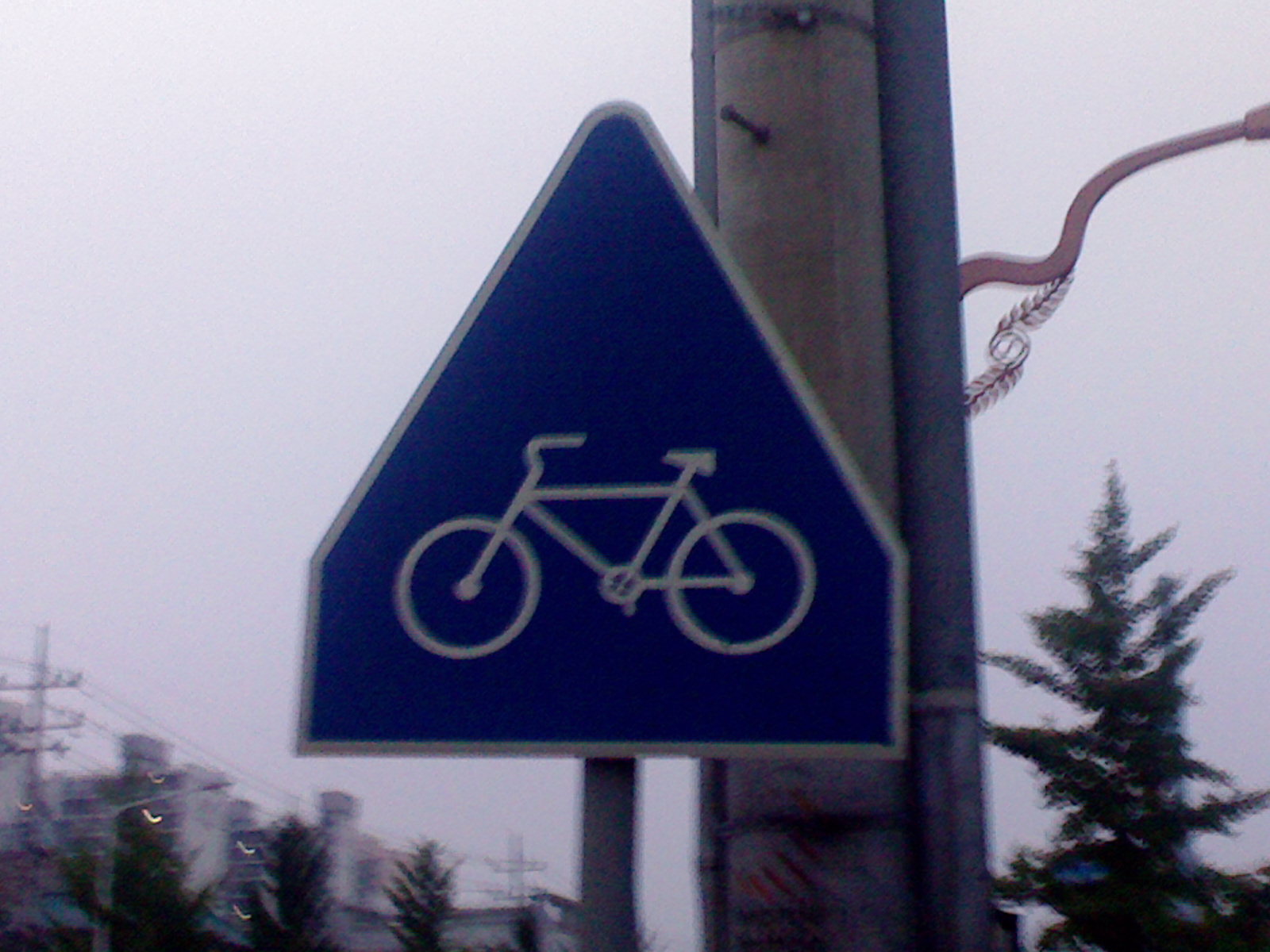
Bicycle Crossing

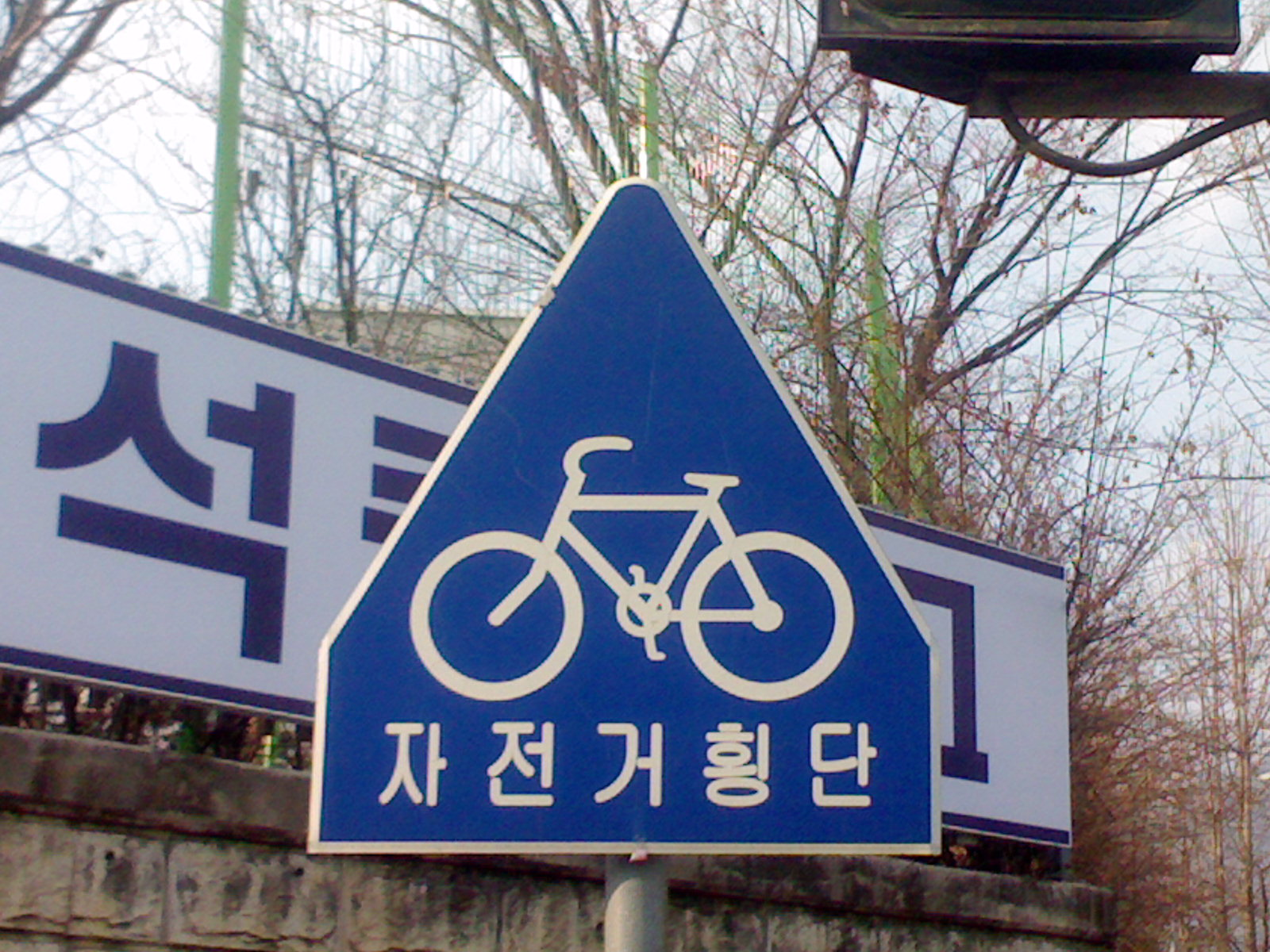
Bicycle Crossing

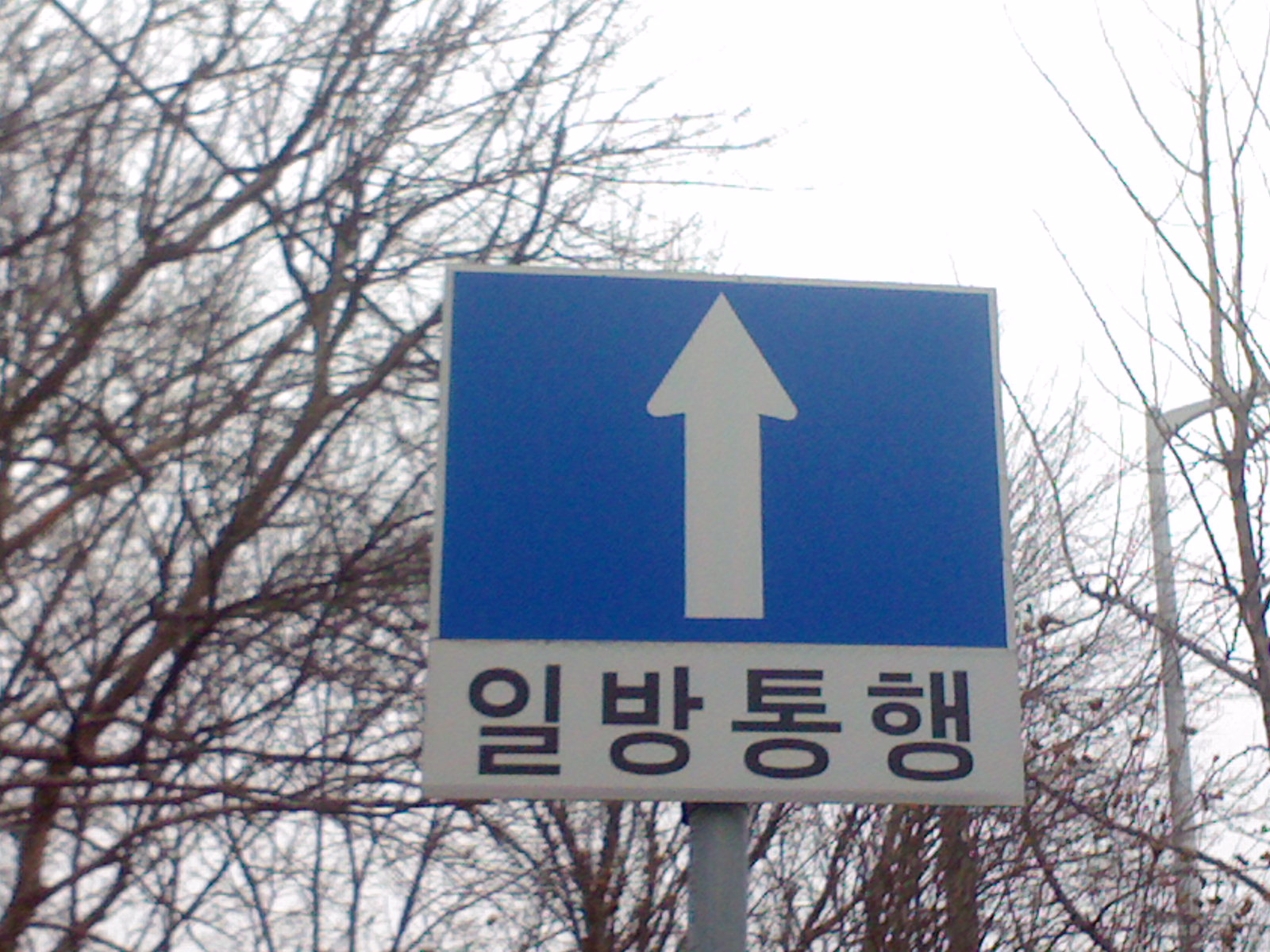
One Way

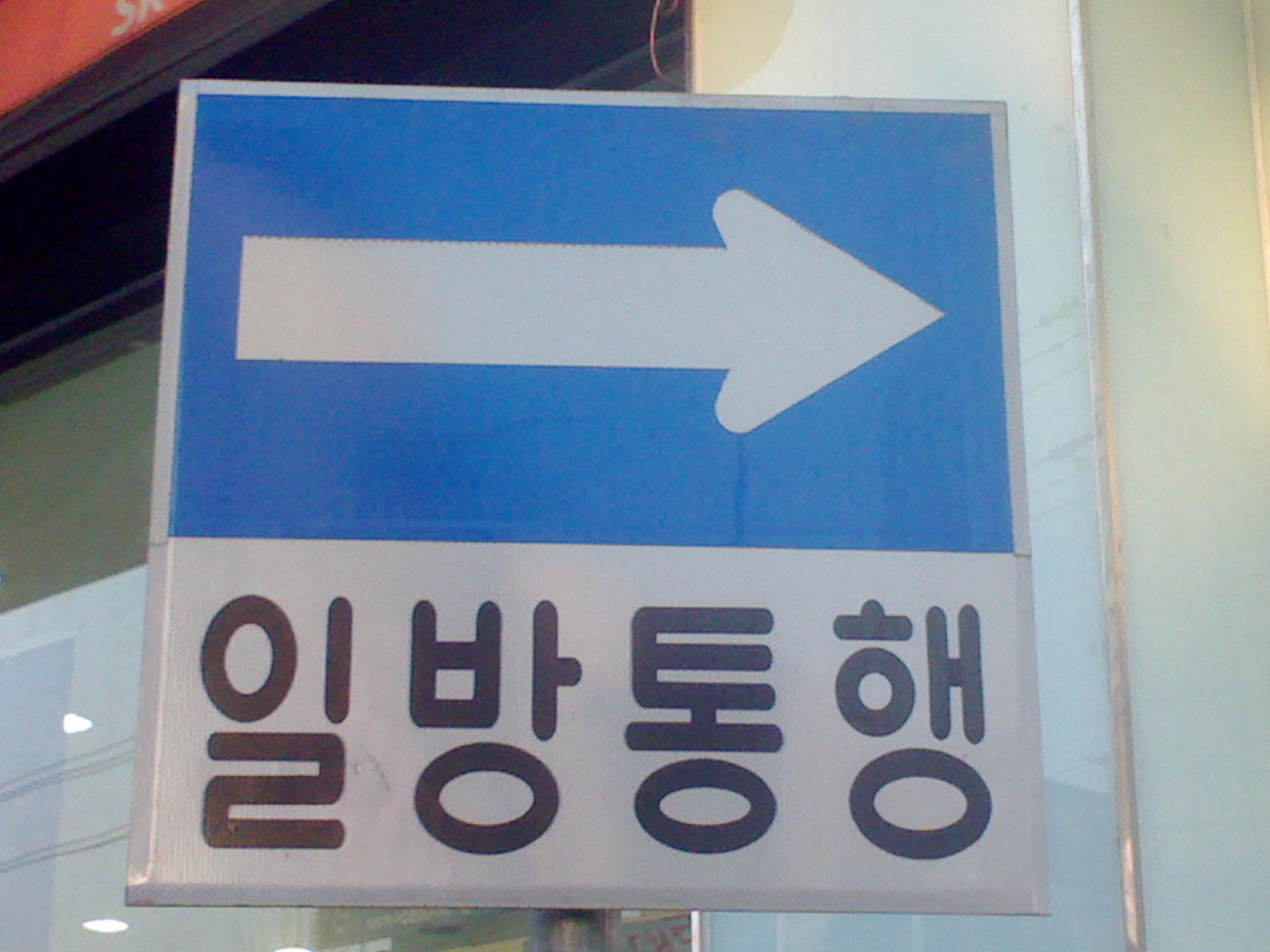
One Way

=== 2 or more signs ===
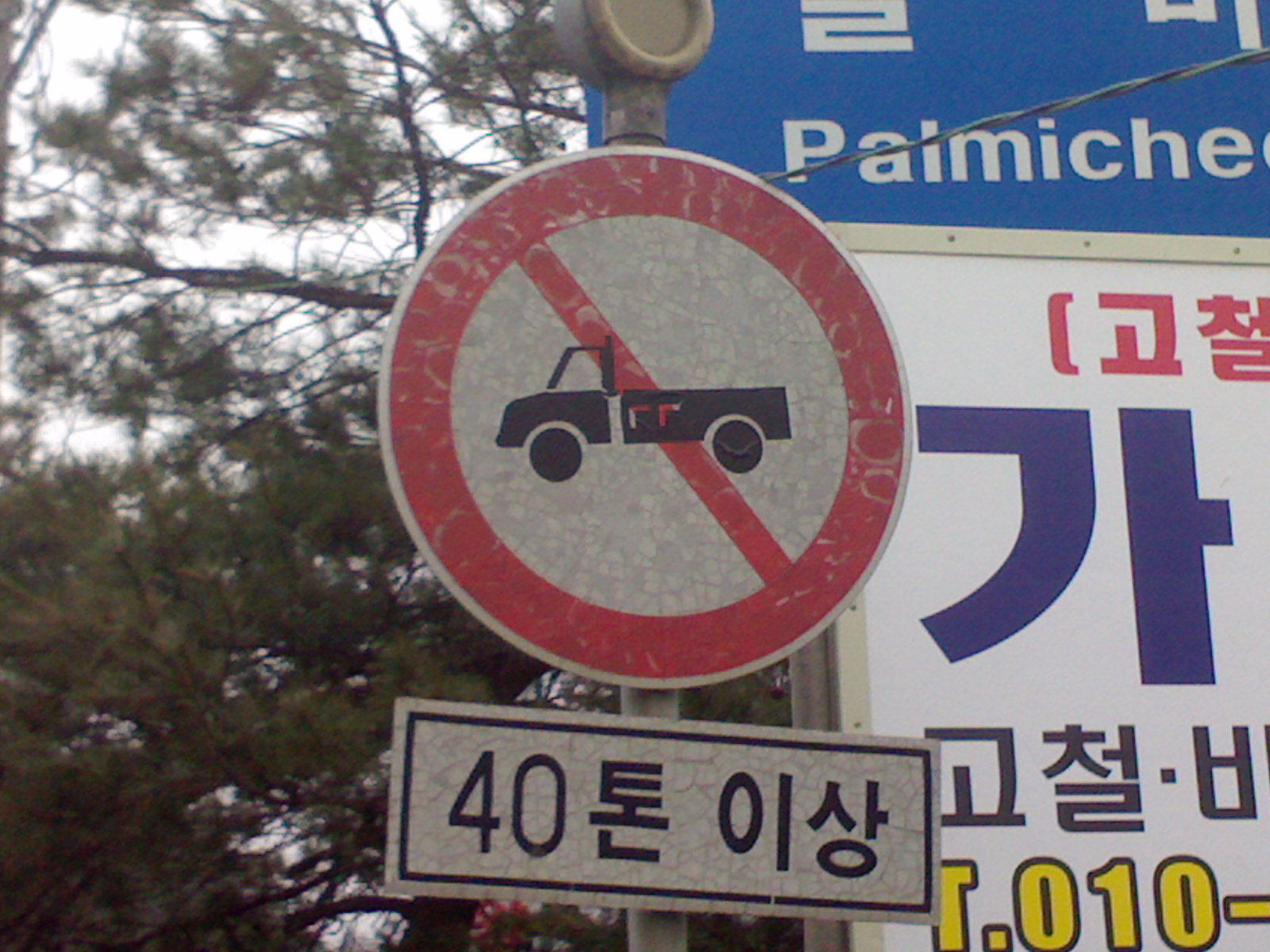
No trucks over 40 tonnes permitted

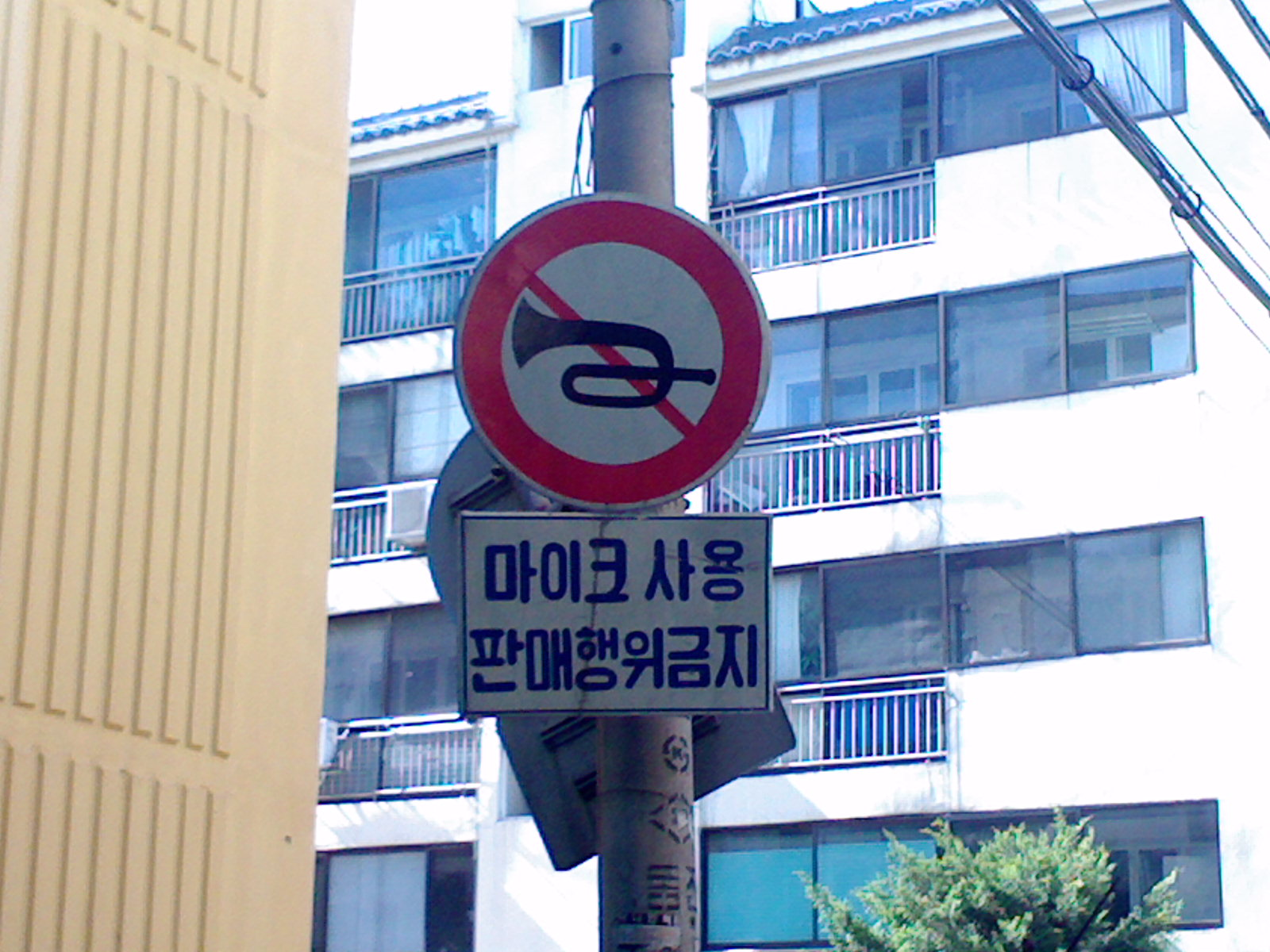
Do Not use horn

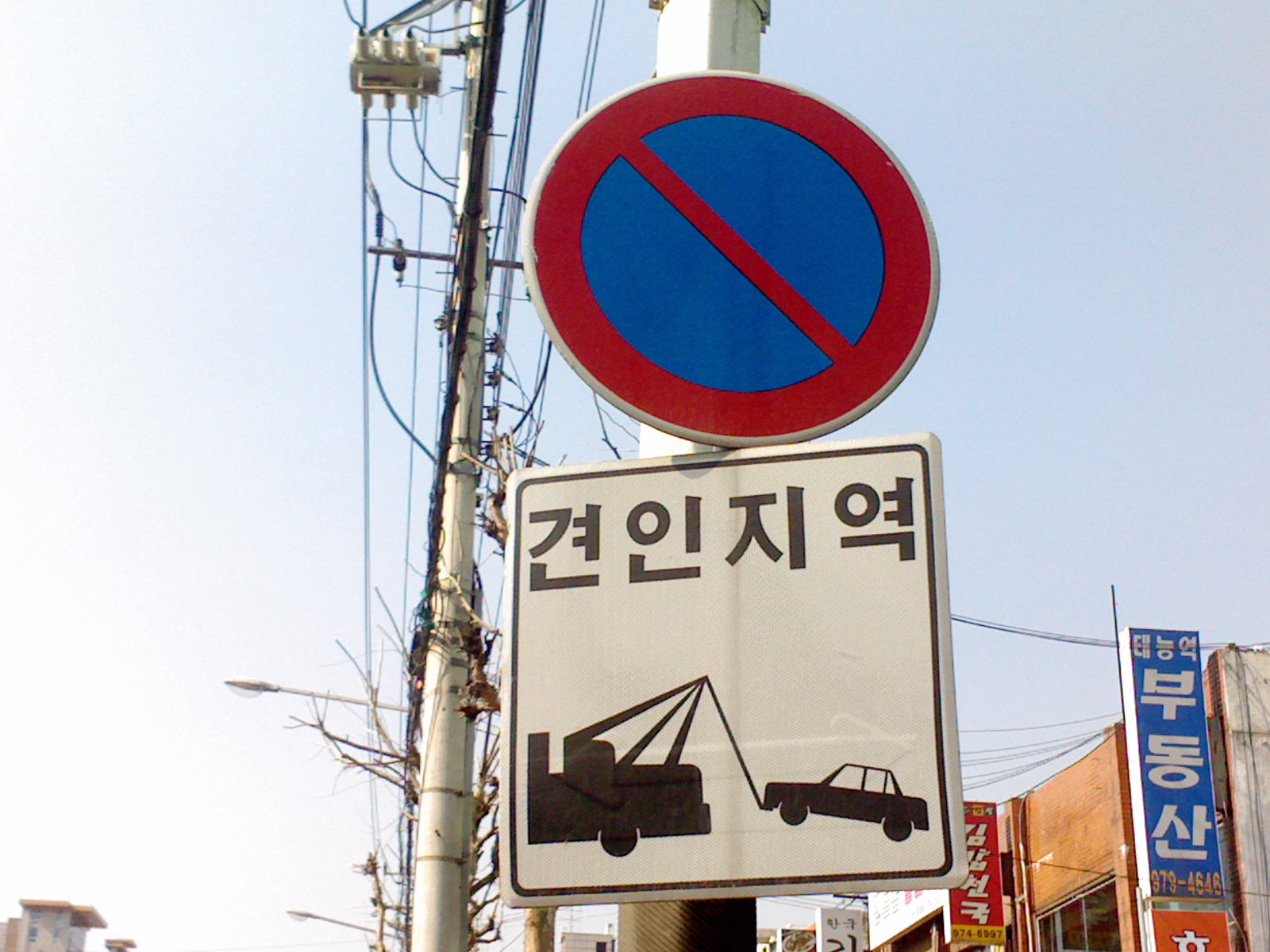
No Parking, Tow Away Zone

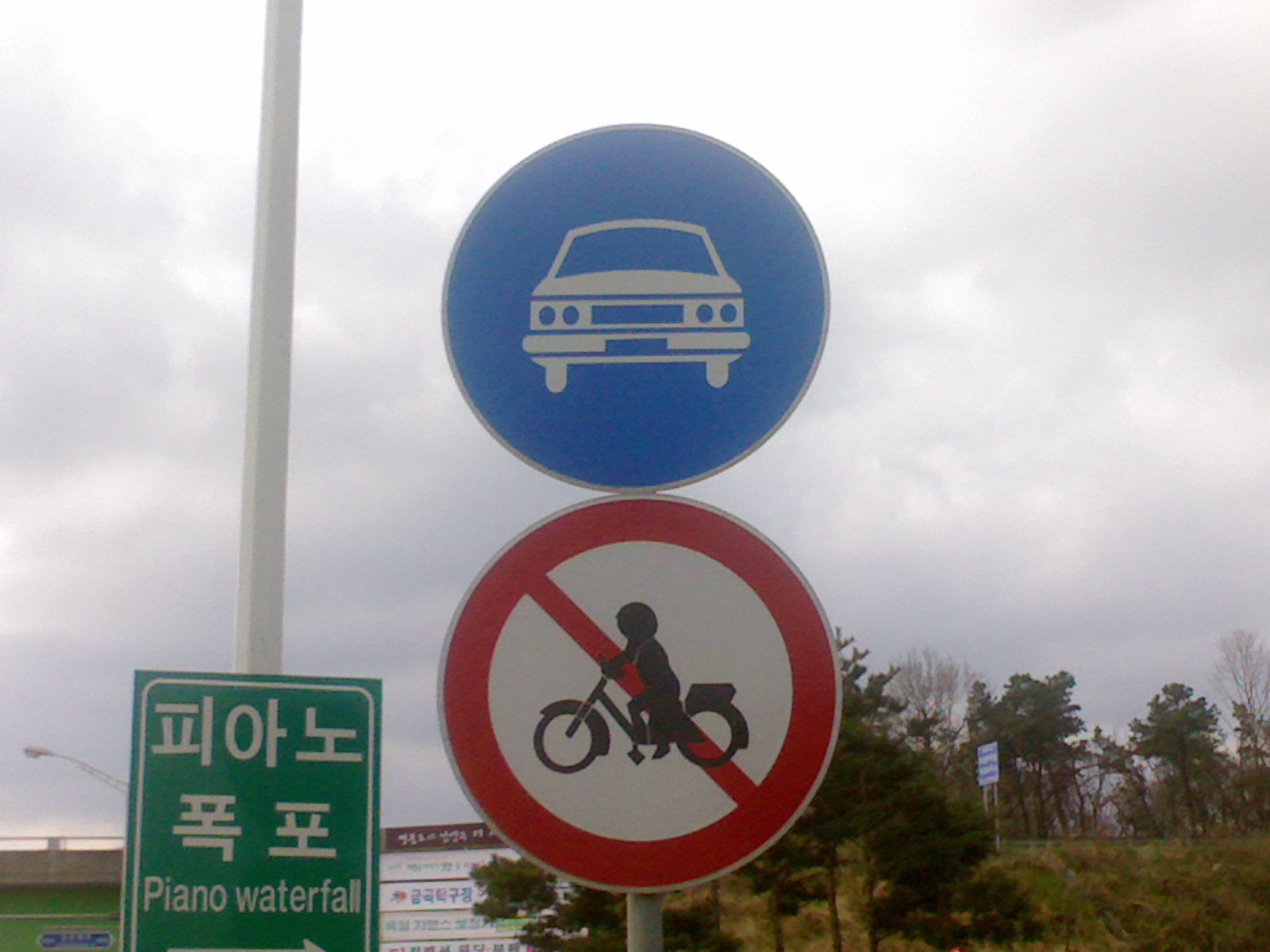
Motor vehicles only sign with a no motorcycles sign below.

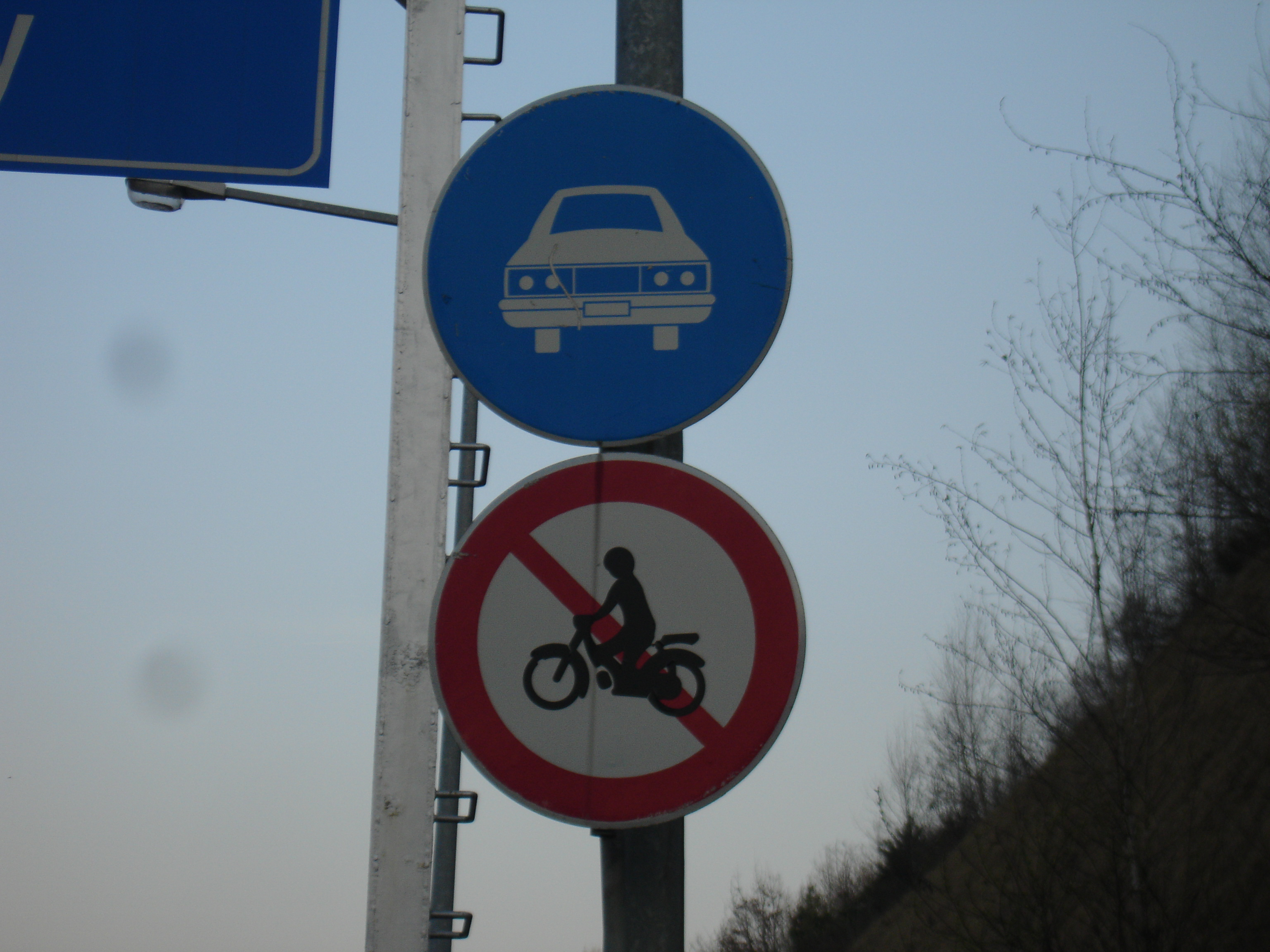
Motor vehicles only with a no motorcycles sign below.

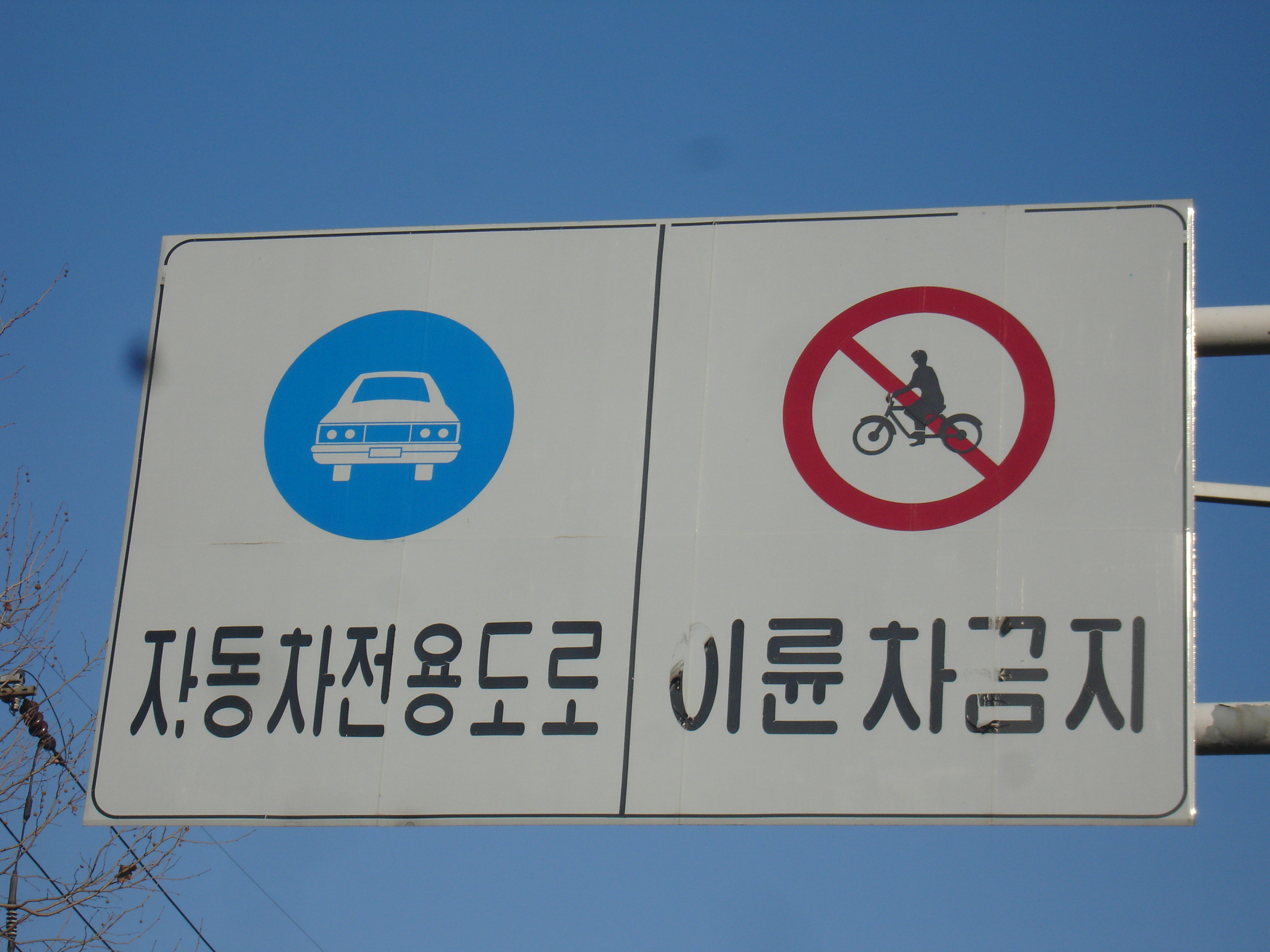
Motor vehicles only with no a motorcycles sign

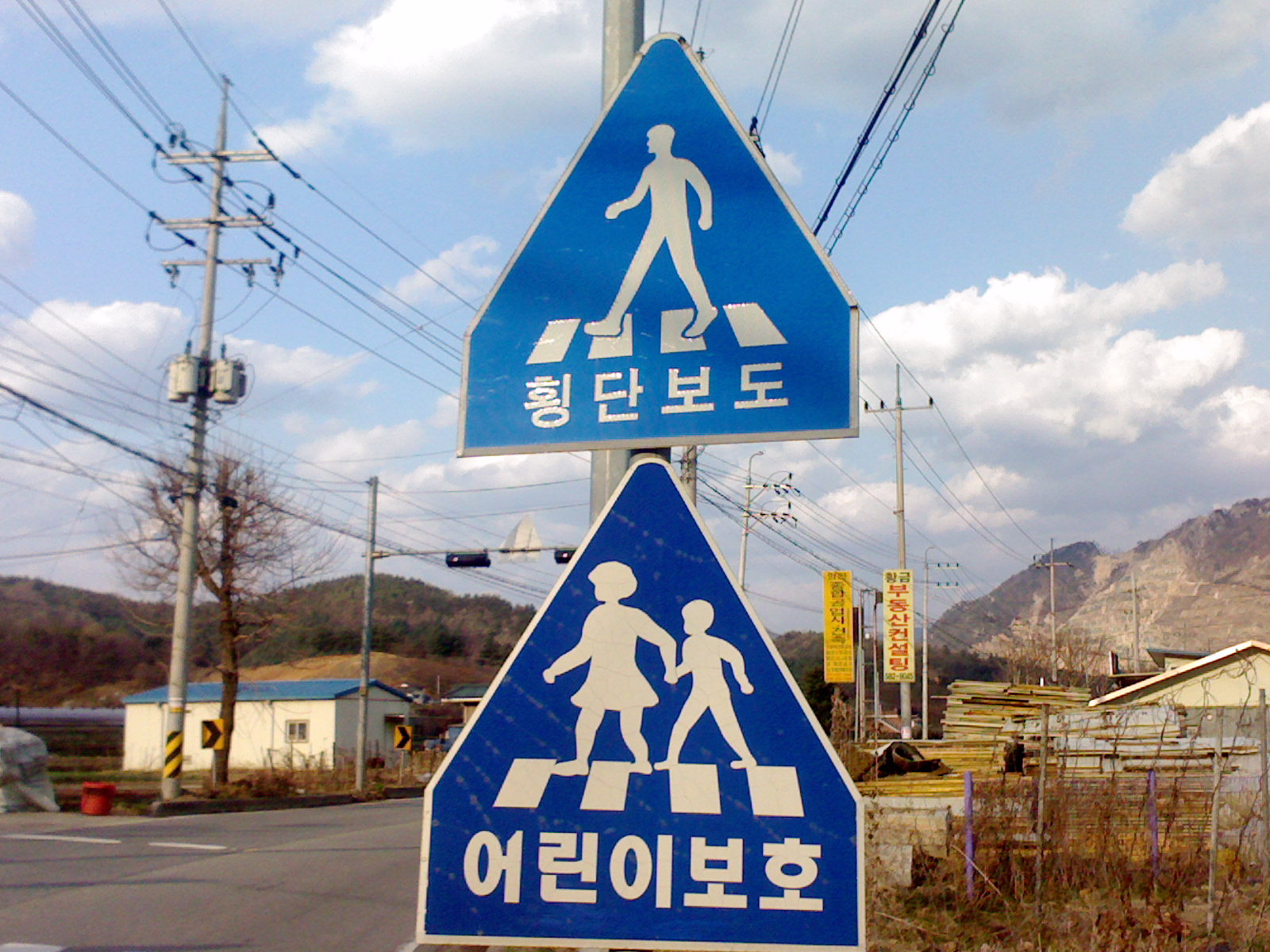
School crosswalk

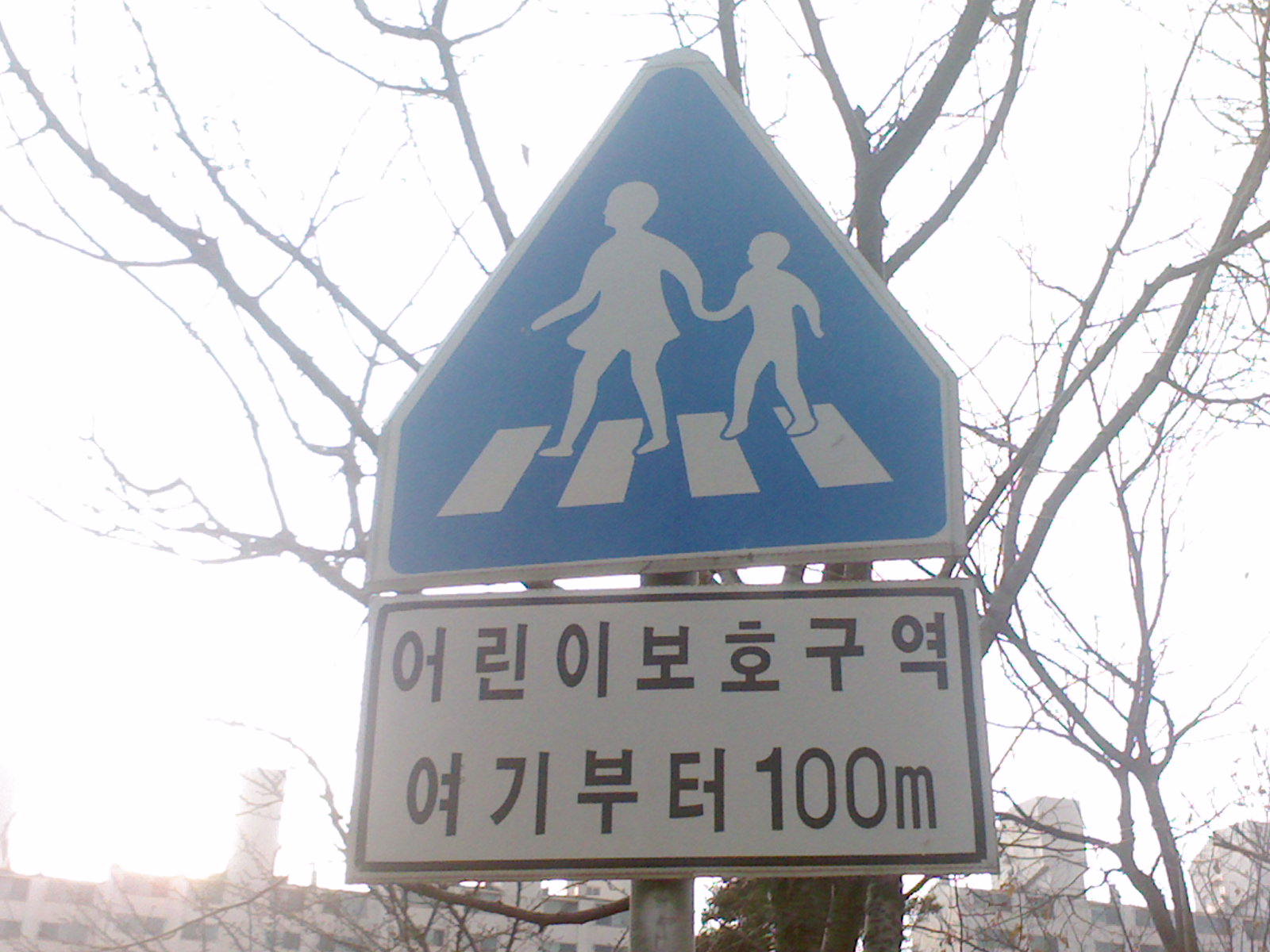
100 metre advance warning of a school crosswalk

=== More ===
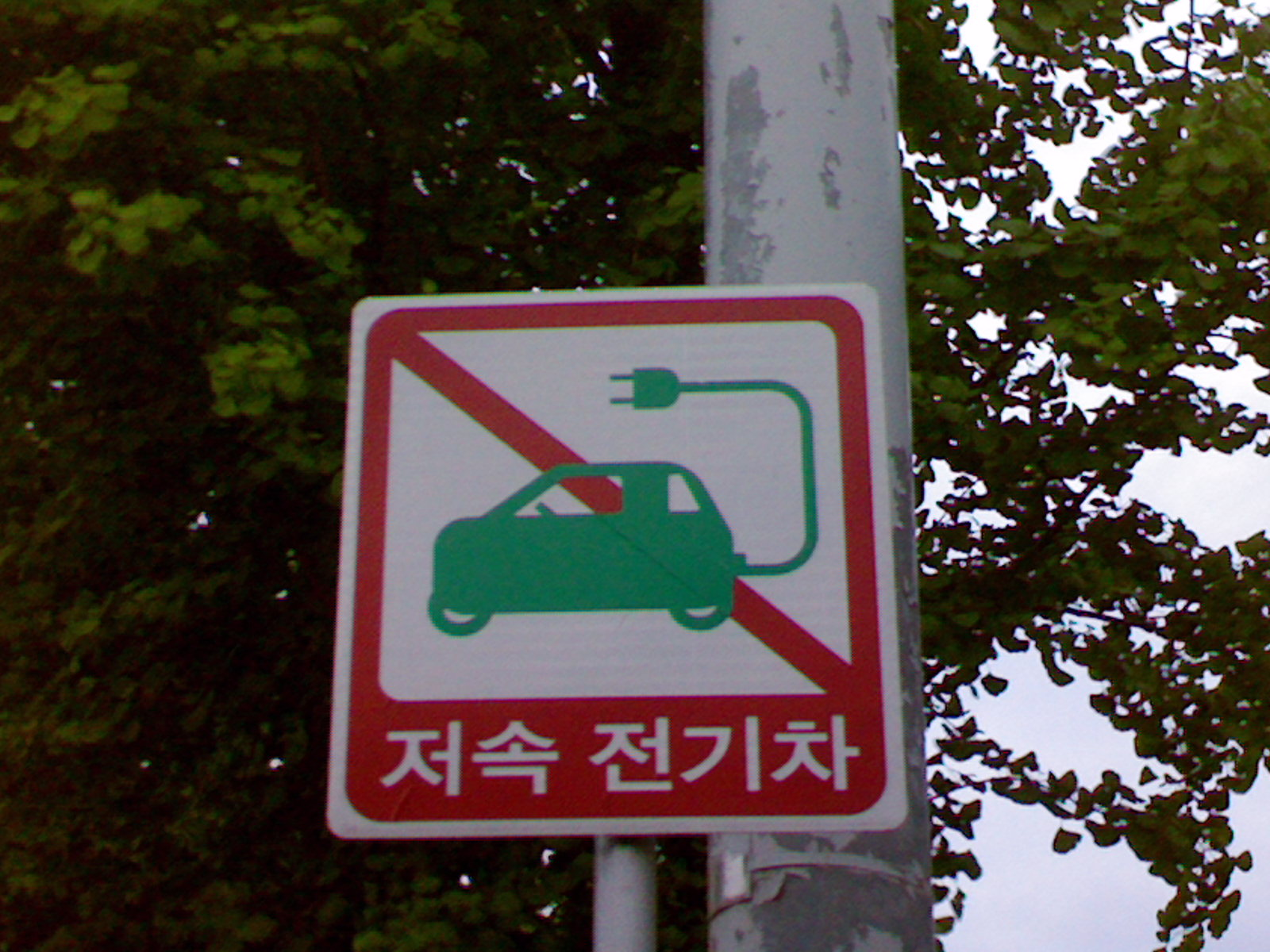
Slow electric vehicles (NEVs) prohibited

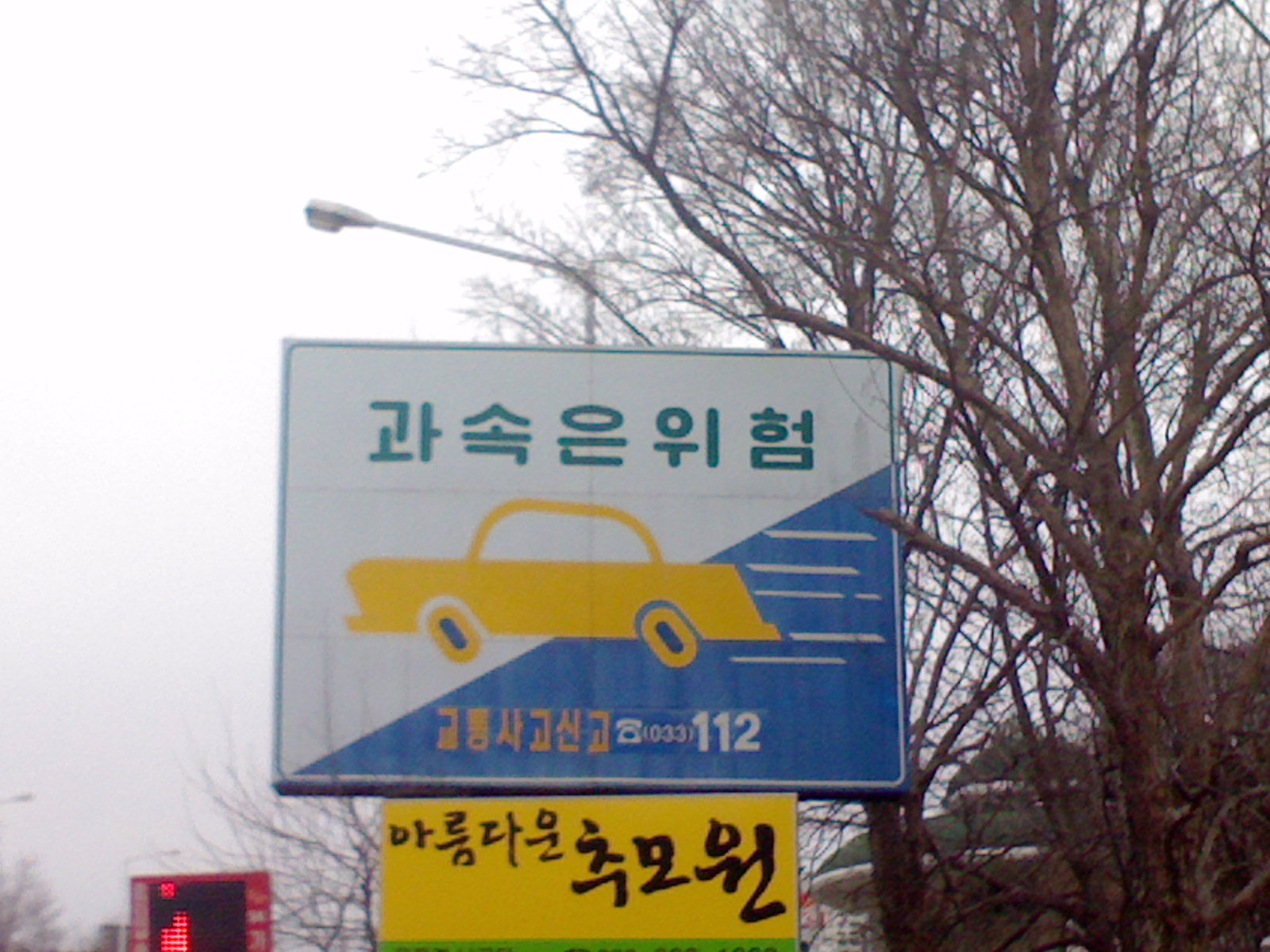
Traffic Safety Enlightenment Sign (Speed Risk)

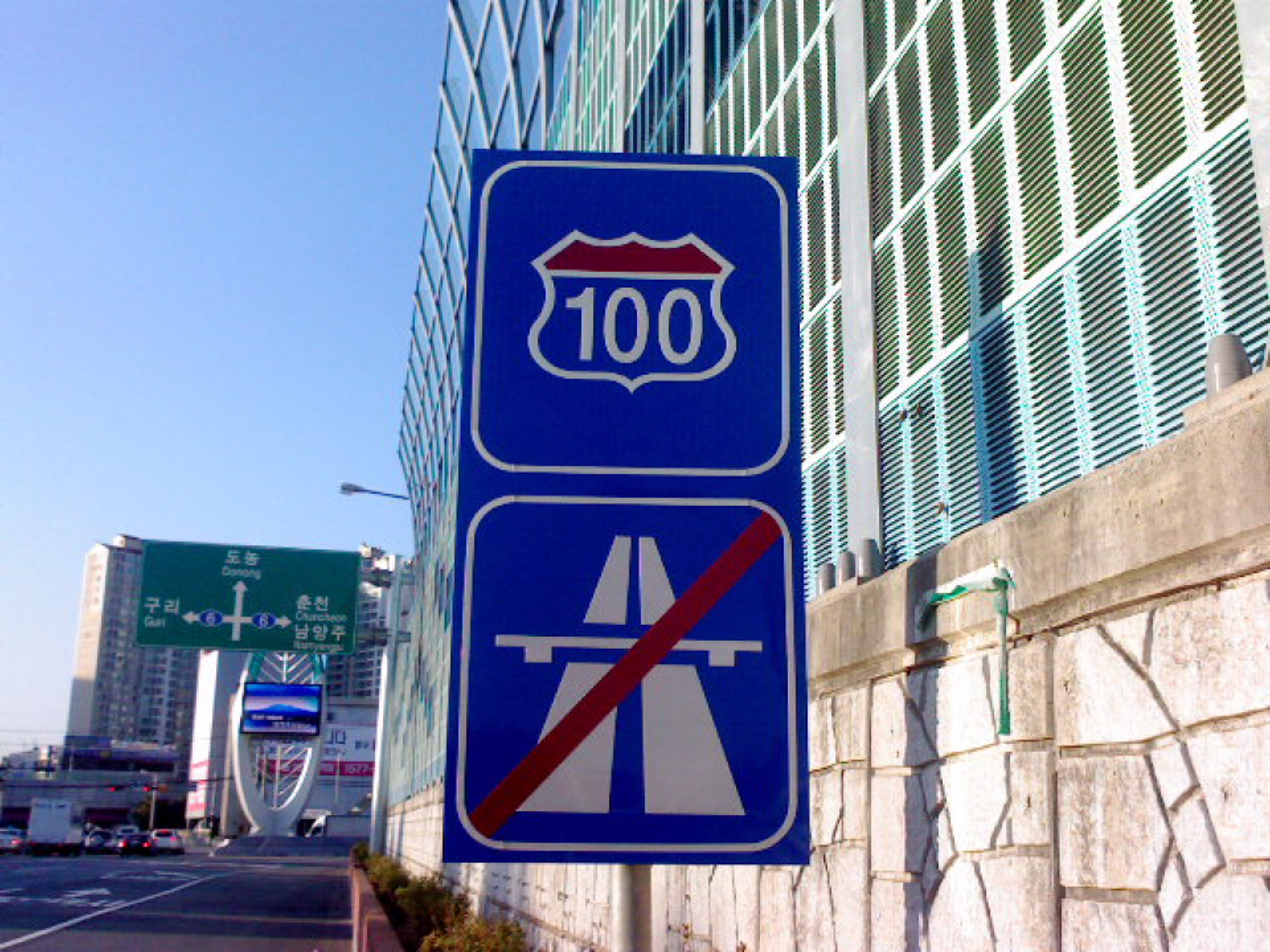
High Expressway 100 Sign with a Motorway ends sign below

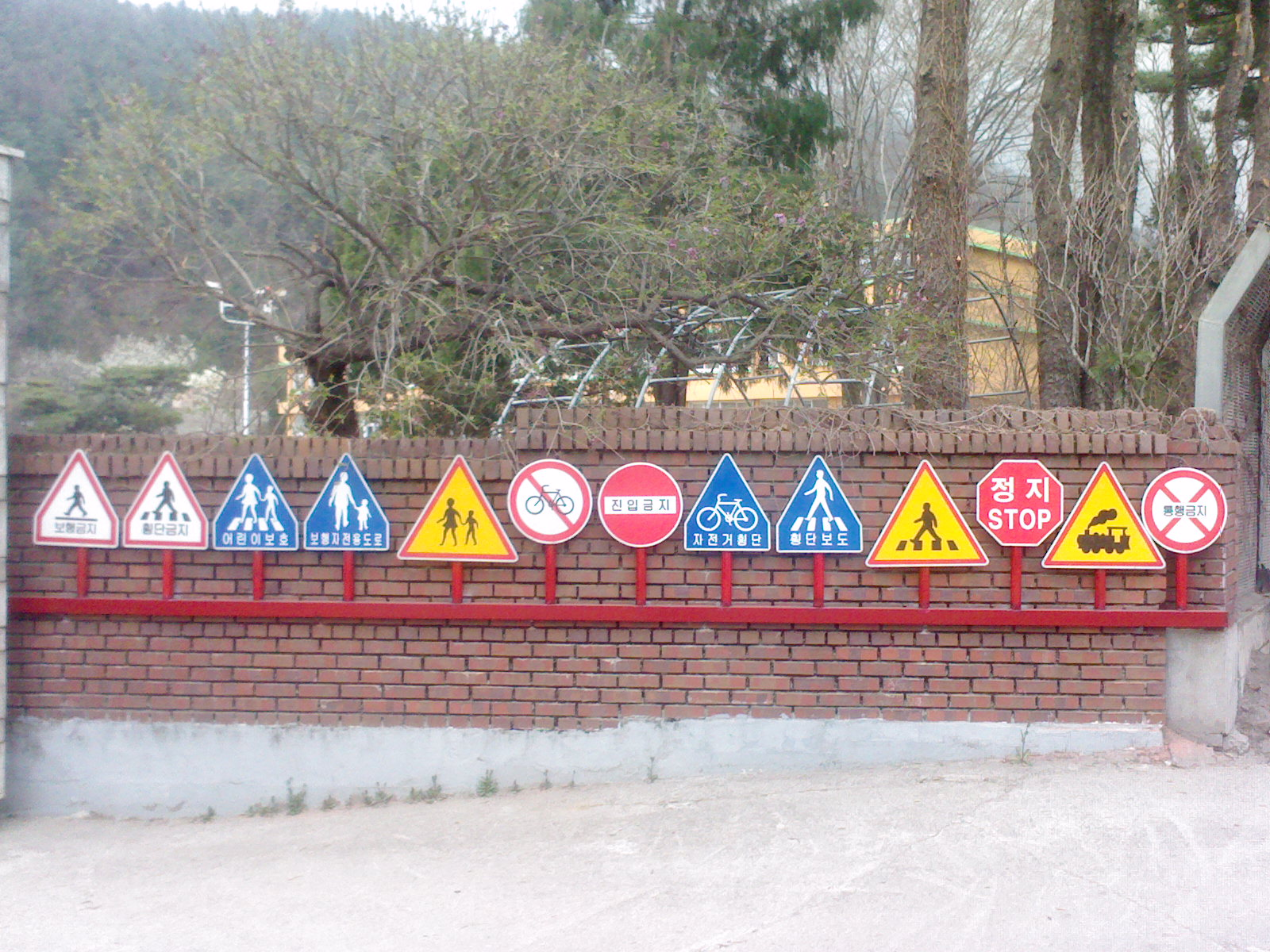
Various Traffic Signs in front of an elementary School

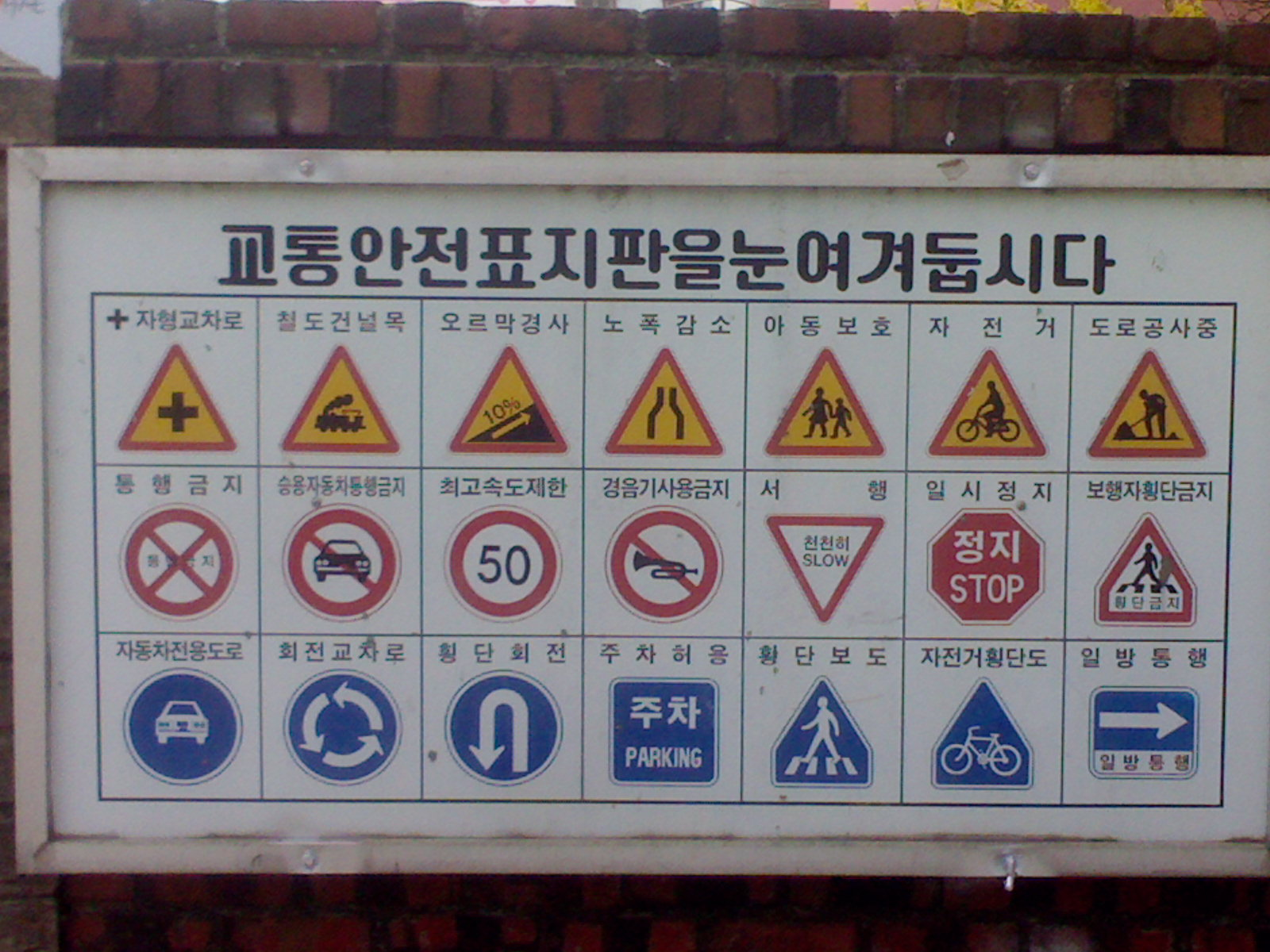
Traffic Signs display in front of an elementary school

== Characteristics ==
Traffic signs in Korea shall be designated as traffic signs on the traffic sign schedule; the actual design of traffic signs installed is often different.

== See also ==
- Road transport in South Korea
