= List of public signage typefaces =

Typefaces used for signage in public areas, such as roads and airports, often share characteristics of, or are chosen for, their readability.

== Typefaces ==
Typeface	Used by	Notes	Image
Achemine	SNCF, France	Created in 2008 to improve station accessibility	
Alfabeto Normale and Alfabeto Stretto	Road signs in Italy, San Marino and Vatican City; Road signs in Albania	Alfabeto Normale is a bolder variant of the British Transport typeface. Alfabeto Stretto is a condensed version of Alfabeto Normale. Both fonts have their own positive (for dark-coloured text on light backgrounds) and negative (for light-coloured text on dark backgrounds) versions.	
Antique Olive	California Department of Transportation	Some regulatory signs	
ANWB-Uu	ANWB-managed wayfinding signage in non-motorways of the Netherlands until 2014. Succeeded by RWS.	The ANWB are officially responsible for those signage until 2014. The Uu humanist typeface are designed by Gerard Unger for the 1998 Redesign.	Low-res specimen.
Arial	China Railway (English signage); Most Chinese urban rail systems (English signage); Taiwan Railway (English signage); Bengaluru Metro PIDS; English signage: Chiba Urban Monorail, Hankai Tramway, Sanyō Electric Railway; Road signs in Azerbaijan, Belarus, Estonia, Laos, Lithuania, North Macedonia, Moldova, Mongolia, Myanmar, Slovenia, Somalia, Taiwan, Turkey and Ukraine.; Road signs in Vietnam (until November 2016)	Venezuelan road signs mostly use Arial Black, a variant or Arial, for legibility.	
Austria	Austria	Being phased out since 2013	
Avant Garde	KAI Commuter rail network in Indonesia (before 2021)	Now gradually replaced with Circular in 2021, with remaining old signages still in place.	
Avenir	Macau Light Rapid Transit; Dublin Airport; Minneapolis–Saint Paul Metro Transit		
AXIS Font	Japanese and English signage: Hisatsu Orange Railway; Japanese signage: Seibu Railway		
Bembo	Smithsonian signage in Washington D.C.		
Bodoni	English signage: Yokohama Minatomirai Railway (Minatomirai Line) Bashamichi Station		
Boutros Advertisers Naskh	Road signs in Bahrain, Iraq, Kuwait, Lebanon, Oman, Qatar, Saudi Arabia, Syria, the United Arab Emirates and Yemen; Beirut International Airport	Formerly used in Dubai International Airport and Riyadh International Airport	
Brusseline	Brussels Intercommunal Transport Company		
Calibri	English signage: Tōyō Rapid Railway		
Calvert	Tyne & Wear Metro, United Kingdom.		
Caractères	France	Used for road signs in France and in some countries in Africa. In France it is used in four variants known as L1, L2, L4, L5. Its usage is mandated by the Interministerial Instruction on Road Signs and Signals (Instruction interministérielle sur la signalisation routière)	
Carretera convencional	Directorate-General for Traffic; Road signs in Spain	Proprietary typeface commissioned for this purpose, used on intracity road signs. Derived from the Transport typeface.	
Casey	Singapore MRT (since 2019); Changi Airport (since 2022)	Used by Kowloon-Canton Railway Corporation until its merger with MTR in 2007. Being gradually replaced by Myriad, which is used by MTR on its networks.	
Cast	Most Taiwanese urban rail systems (since 2022)	Designed by Dominique Kerber	
Century Gothic	English signage: Kōbe New Transit, Nagaragawa Railway		
Cezanne (セザンヌ)	Japanese signage: Iyo Railway (Iyotetsu)		
Circular	Transport for West Midlands (since 2018); Kereta Api Indonesia (since 2020)		
Clarendon	U.S. National Park Service road signs	Used by Public Transport Company in Poznań as the typeface for its fleet vehicles numbering	
Clearview	Destination signs of Quebec autoroutes (shields are in Highway Gothic); Road signs in Brazil, Canada, Indonesia, Israel, Panama, the Philippines, Sri Lanka and the United States	Developed to replace U.S. FHWA (Federal Highway Administration) typefaces	
Dansk Vejtavleskrift	Road signs in Denmark	Derived from the Transport typeface	
Deutsche Bahn WLS	Deutsche Bahn station signage	Developed in close reference to Helvetica	
DF Heisei Gothic (DF平成ゴシック)	Japanese signage: Chikuhō Electric Railroad (Chikutetsu)		
DF Kaisho (DF楷書)	Japanese signage: Tsugaru Railway		
DF Maru Gothic (DF丸ゴシック)	Japanese and English signage: Aizu Railway, Noto Railway; English signage: Gakunan Electric Train, Izuhakone Railway		
DF Reisho (DF隷書)	Japanese and English signage: Fuji Kyūkō (Fujikjyū), Odakyū Hakone (Hakone Tozan Railway); Japanese signage: Heisei Chikuhō Railway (Mojikō Retro Scenic Line)		
DIN 1451	Road signs in Marin, San Francisco, and San Mateo Counties; Road signs in Germany; Road signs in the Czech Republic; Road signs in Latvia; Road signs in the Southern African Development Community; Road signs in Brunei; Road signs in Singapore; Road signs in Syria; Bengaluru Metro (Namma Metro) signage Kansai International Airport (KIX) (since 2022) Minneapolis–Saint Paul International Airport; English signage: Keisei Electric Railway	The DIN typeface was used for regulatory and warning Signs in Marin, San Francisco, and San Mateo counties. Also used in the Greek motorway network The DIN typeface for the Namma Metro is in English and Kannada. The DIN typeface is currently in the process of gradually replacing the Frutiger typeface for Kansai Airport during its renovations in preparation for Expo 2025.	
Drogowskaz	Polish road signage typeface	One of a few digitalisations; officially the typeface used in Polish road signs has no defined name.	
Esseltub	Previously used in Stockholm Metro		
FIP signage typeface	Government of Canada	A modified version of Helvetica Medium used by the Government of Canada	
FF Fago	ADIF	Used as official font for signage system of all Spanish railway stations owned by the state-owned administrator, ADIF	
FF Meta	Stockholm Metro; Caltrans; Birmingham Airport; TransLink (British Columbia)	Some mile marker signs	
FF Transit	Berliner Verkehrsbetriebe; Verkehrsverbund Berlin-Brandenburg; Düsseldorf Airport; Société de transport de Montréal	Developed by MetaDesign for Berlin's public transport company BVG and later adopted by other transport systems. Contains many pictograms for signage. Based on Frutiger.	
FF Scala Sans	Los Angeles Metro		
FHWA series (Highway Gothic)	Road signs in the Americas, Australia, China, India, Indonesia, Macau, Malaysia, the Netherlands, the Philippines, Saudi Arabia, Spain, Taiwan, Thailand, and Turkey	Developed for U.S. road signage. Formerly used on Spanish motorways. The Dutch Rijkswaterstaat maintains a localised version (RWS: Cc, CCx, Dd, Ddx, Ee, Eex series) with ligature and stroke adjustments for visibility improvement on blue backgrounds. Turkey uses two typefaces on road signs based on this typeface – O-Serisi for motorways and E-Serisi for all other roads.	
Folk (フォーク)	Japanese and English signage: Ainokaze Toyama Railway		
Freight Sans	Kempegowda International Airport		
Frutiger	Charles de Gaulle Airport; Istanbul Metro(Except M11); Road signs in Switzerland; Amtrak; Across the public transport network of Oslo, Norway; Dulles International Airport (IAD); BAA Airports in the UK, National Health Service in England; Frankfurt Airport; Buenos Aires Subte; JR East (numbers); English signage of many Japanese railway operators (Note: Used in Aoimori Railway, Fukuoka City Subway, Hiroshima Rapid Transit (Astram Line), IR Ishikawa Railway, JR West, Kagoshima City Tram, Keihan Electric Railway, Keikyū Corporation, Kintetsu Railway, Kōbe Municipal Subway (Hokushin Line), Kōbe Municipal Subway (Kaigan and Seishin-Yamate Lines), Kumamoto City Tram, Nagoya Rinkai Rapid Transit (Aonami Line), Toden Arakawa Line, Toei Subway, Tokyo Metro, Toyama Chihō Railway (Toyamakō Line), and Yokohama Seaside Line (Kanazawa Seaside Line).); Signage at most PANYNJ airports; Amsterdam Airport Schiphol; Budapest Public Transport Authority; Österreichische Bundesbahnen; Ottawa street name signage; Bay Area Rapid Transit; Warsaw Public Transport Authority; Kansai International Airport (KIX) (currently being phased out); Slovenian Railways	The Frutiger typeface was commissioned for use at Paris Charles de Gaulle Airport in 1975. It has also been used for regulatory and warning signs in Del Norte, Humboldt, Lake, Mendocino, Napa, Solano, Sonoma, and Yolo Counties.	
Futura	Italian railways Street signs in Stockholm		
Giaothong1 and Giaothong2	Road signs in Vietnam	Modification of DIN 1451 typeface with Vietnamese extension	
Gill Sans	British Railways (until 1965); Transperth; English signage: Maihama Resort Line (Disney Resort Line); Road signs in Vietnam (until November 2016)	Also the official font for all the signage system of the Spanish Government. Modified variant of Gill Sans Bold Condensed used on road signs in former East Germany until 1990.	
Gona (ゴナ)	Japanese and English signage: Mōka Railway, Yagan Railway; Japanese signage: Chizu Express, IR Ishikawa Railway, Kantō Railway (Kantetsu), Kashima Rinkai Railway, Manyōsen; English signage: Kōnan Railway	A Gothic typeface released by Shaken in 1975, it was once extremely popular as the typeface for railway signage in Japan. However, until October 2024, it was only available for phototypesetting and not as a digital font for desktop publishing, which made it difficult to use. In contrast, a similar typeface called Shin Go, released by rival company Morisawa in 1990, was compatible with desktop publishing from start. As a result, many railway operators have since transitioned to using Shin Go.	
Gothic 4550 (ゴシック4550)	Japanese and English signage: IGR Iwate Galaxy Railway; Japanese signage: Kyoto Municipal Subway, Nankai Electric Railway, Wakayama Electric Railway		
Gothic MB101 (ゴシックMB101)	Japanese signage: Mizuma Railway		
Goudy Old Style	Used on Victoria PTC railway station signs in the 1990s, replacing the green The Met signs.	The blue Metlink signs replaced these signs in 2003 after a short trial of Connex signs (using Verdana) at Mitcham and Rosanna stations.	
Hangil	Road signs in South Korea	A Hangul typeface designed by Sandoll Communications in 2008, being used on traffic signs throughout the entire South Korea except for some part of Seoul, along with Panno.	
Heisei Kaku Gothic (平成角ゴシック)	Japanese and English signage: Nishikigawa Railway, Okayama Electric Tramway, Yuri Kōgen Railway; Japanese signage: Chiba Urban Monorail, Gakunan Electric Train; English signage: Amagi Railway		
Helvetica	New York City Subway system; Road signs in Åland; Road signs in Cambodia; Road signs in China; Road signs in Israel; Chicago Transit Authority system; Massachusetts Bay Transportation Authority system; Washington Metropolitan Area Transit Authority system; Baltimore Metro SubwayLink; Toronto subway (destination signs); Madrid Metro; English signage of many (more than 40) Japanese railway operators (Note: Used in Aichi Rapid Transit (Linimo), Chichibu Railway, Chizu Express, Echigo Tokimeki Railway, Enoshima Electric Railway (Enoden), Hakodate City Tram, Hankyū Railway, Hiroshima Electric Railway (Hiroden), Hokuetsu Express, Iyo Railway (Iyotetsu), JR East, JR Hokkaidō, JR Kyūshū, JR Shikoku, Kantō Railway (Kantetsu), Kashima Rinkai Railway, Keifuku Electric Railroad (Randen), Kitakyūshū Urban Monorail, Kyoto Municipal Subway (Tōzai Line), Mizuma Railway, Nagoya Railroad (Meitetsu), Osaka Metro (Nankō Port Town Line), Osaka Monorail, Ryūtetsu, Saitama Railway, Sangi Railway, Sanriku Railway, Sapporo Streetcar, Seibu Railway, Sendai Airport Transit, Shibayama Railway, Shigaraki Kohgen Railway, Shōnan Monorail, South Hokkaidō Railway, Takamatsu-Kotohira Electric Railroad (Kotoden), Tama Toshi Monorail, Tōbu Railway, Toei Nippori-Toneri Liner, Tokyo Monorail, Tōkyū Corporation, Watarase Keikoku Railway, Willer Trains (Kyoto Tango Railway, Tantetsu), and Yōrō Railway.); Fort Lauderdale International Airport signage; Los Angeles International Airport signage; Miami International Airport signage; Phoenix Sky Harbor International Airport signage; Vancouver International Airport signage; Signage in Indonesian airports operated by Angkasa Pura; Generics of geographical locations in Quebec are written in Helvetica Medium	Formerly used the Hong Kong MTR, Stockholm Metro, ÖBB, Deutsche Bundesbahn portions of the LACMTA system and the Melbourne MTA, and some Toronto subway station signage. Less commonly, the typeface is used on street signs in the United States, including in some suburbs of the Baltimore-Washington Metropolitan Area, parts of Pennsylvania, and by the Contra Costa County Transportation Authority. Previously used on road signs in Japan and South Korea.	
Helvetica Neue	Metlink/Public Transport Victoria; Swiss Federal Railways; Street signs in Pinole; Road signs in Catalonia	Being phased out on the Victoria public transport system in favor of Network Sans from 2021; SBB uses its own version of Neue Helvetica named SBB and named "Helvetica Semi-Bold Corrected" by its designer Josef Müller-Brockmann in the SBB Design Manual.	
HG Maru Gothic (HG丸ゴシック)	Japanese and English signage: Kurobe Gorge Railway, Nose Electric Railway (Noseden), Tenryū Hamanako Railroad; English signage: Heisei Chikuhō Railway (Mojikō Retro Scenic Line)		
HGS Gothic (HGSゴシック)	Japanese and English signage: Ise Railway, Sapporo Municipal Subway		
Hiragino	NEXCO East Japan; NEXCO Central Japan; NEXCO West Japan	Japan Highway Public Corporation (divided into three NEXCO group companies in 2005) used its own JH Standard Text until 2010. Since 2010, Hiragino is used for Japanese text, Frutiger for numbers, and Vialog for English text.	
Hiragino Kaku Go (ヒラギノ角ゴ)	Japanese and English signage: Heisei Chikuhō Railway (Ita, Itoda, and Tagawa Lines); Japanese signage: Hankai Tramway, Kōbe Municipal Subway (Kaigan and Seishin-Yamate Lines), Sagami Railway (Sōtetsu)		
Hiragino UD Kaku Go (ヒラギノUD角ゴ)	Japanese and English signage: Sendai Subway; Japanese signage: Osaka Metro (All lines except for the Nankō Port Town Line), Sendai Airport Transit		
Iwata Shin Gothic (イワタ新ゴシック)	Japanese signage: Toei Nippori-Toneri Liner		
Iwata UD Gothic (イワタUDゴシック)	Japanese and English signage: Enshū Railway (Entetsu); Japanese signage: Keisei Electric Railway, Kintetsu Railway, Kōbe Municipal Subway (Hokushin Line), Shizuoka Railway, Yurikamome		
Iwata UD Maru Gothic (イワタUD丸ゴシック)	Japanese signage: Hankyū Railway, Tōyō Rapid Railway		
JNR-L	Japanese and English signage: JR Central (Shinkansen); English signage: JR Central (non-Shinkansen), JR-Central Transport Service (TKJ)	A typeface developed and used by the former Japanese National Railways (JNR), based on Sumi Maru Gothic. Today, it is used exclusively by the JR Central Group.	
Johnston	Transport for London	Some Citybus and New World First Bus route displays in Hong Kong	
JTC Win (JTCウイン)	Japanese and English signage: Ibara Railway, Jōmō Electric Railway, Nagasaki Electric Tramway, Shinano Railway		
Jun (じゅん)	Japanese signage: Kōbe New Transit, Osaka Metro (Nankō Port Town Line)		
Kaku Gothic-tai Ca (角ゴシック体Ca)	Japanese signage: Eizan Electric Railway		
Kokutesu-ppoi Font (国鉄っぽいフォント)	Japanese and English signage: Ōigawa Railway	A free font influenced by Japanese National Railways (JNR) style typefaces, such as Sumimaru Gothic and JNR-L.	
Kozuka Gothic (小塚ゴシック)	English signage: Tosaden Kōtsū		
Kozuka Minchō (小塚明朝)	Japanese signage: Maihama Resort Line (Disney Resort Line)		
LLM Lettering	Road signs in Malaysia.	Based on the Italian Alfabeto Normale and Alfabeto Stretto	
LogoG (ロゴG)	Japanese signage: Hanshin Electric Railway		
LTA Identity Typeface	Singapore MRT		
Lucida Sans Unicode	English signage: Shizuoka Railway		
Mark Pro	Istanbul Metropolitan Municipality		
Meiryo (メイリオ)	Japanese and English signage: Kōbe Electric Railway (Shintetsu)		
Metrolis	Lisbon Metro	Custom font for the 1995 rebranding, designed by the Foundry (Freda Sack and David Quay)	
Metron	Prague Metro	Created in 1973 by Jiří Rathouský	
Midashi Go (見出ゴ)	Japanese signage: Sapporo Streetcar		
Moscow Sans	Public transport and wayfinding in Moscow since 2015	Custom font family by Scott Williams and Henrik Kubel (A2-TYPE) in collaboration with Ilya Ruderman (CSTM Fonts)	
Motorway	Motorway route numbers in Ireland and the United Kingdom.	The numerals are used for exit numbers and route numbers in Portugal.	
MS Gothic (MS ゴシック)	Japanese signage: Isumi Railway, Saitama New Urban Transit (New Shuttle)		
Myriad	Hong Kong's Mass Transit Railway; Korail (for English signage); Seoul Metro (for English signage); English signage: Chikuhō Electric Railroad (Chikutetsu), Isumi Railway, Matsuura Railway, Nagoya Municipal Subway, Yokohama Municipal Subway; Signage at Istanbul Airport; Signage at Kharkiv Metro		
Myriad Pro	PKP Polskie Linie Kolejowe and PKP Intercity; Hungarian State Railways; Fairfax Connector (county bus operator of Fairfax County, Virginia, United States)	PKP railways in Poland: Myriad Pro Semibold with kerning increased by 25% is used for train station signage. Additional text in foreign languages (English for many signs, as well as neighbor languages for stations in border areas) is set in Italic. Myriad Pro Light, Regular, Bold, and their Italic counterparts are used by PKP Intercity in printed communication (leaflets, folders, etc.); Fairfax Connector: font used for bus stop signage and both printed and traditional PDF timetables	
Nar (ナール)	Japanese and English signage: Abukuma Express, Jōshin Electric Railway, Nagano Electric Railway (Nagaden), Toyama Chihō Railway (All lines except for the Toyamakō Line), Yamagata Railway; Japanese signage: Kishū Railway, Kitakyūshū Urban Monorail, Kōnan Railway; English signage: Manyōsen		
Neris	Manila MRT signage (since 2016)		
Network Sans	Public Transport Victoria Transport Victoria	Replaced Helvetica Neue	
New Frank	Transport for New South Wales, Australia	Used for all transport signage around Sydney and New South Wales.	
New Rubrik	Ninoy Aquino International Airport, Manila, Philippines	Replacement for Helvetica on airport signage	
News Gothic	NYC Subway (Mid 20th Century); Aena airports in Spain	Used on the NYC Subway in the mid 20th century	
Noorda	Milan Metro	Variation of Akzidenz-Grotesk with shorter ascenders and descenders	
Now (ナウ)	Japanese signage: Tokyo Waterfront Area Rapid Transit (Rinkai Line), Yokohama Minatomirai Railway (Minatomirai Line) Motomachi-Chūkagai Station; English signage: Toyohashi Railroad (Toyotetsu)		
NPS Rawlinson	United States National Park Service	Developed as a replacement for Clarendon	
NR Brunel	United Kingdom railway stations Iarnród Éireann station signage	Primarily major stations managed by Network Rail in Britain, introduced in the mid-1990s	
NS Sans	Dutch national railway operator Nederlandse Spoorwegen	In-house design based on the Frutiger typeface	
Ovink	Road signs in the Netherlands (1966 - 1990); Vehicle registration plates of the Netherlands (1961-1990)	Dutch national standard NEN3225:1961 — designed by Dutch designer G.W. Ovink, based on Gill Sans with spacing of FHWA	
Panno	Road signs in South Korea	A Latin typeface being used on traffic signs throughout the entire South Korea except for some part of Seoul, along with Hangil.	
Parisine	Paris Metro; English signage: Osaka Metro (All lines except for the Nankō Port Town Line)		
Pragmatica	Saint Petersburg Metro (since 2002)	Currently (2010–11) being replaced by Freeset, Cyrillic variation of Frutiger	
PT Sans	Public transport in Jakarta (Jak Lingko) since 2021: TransJakarta, Jakarta MRT, Jakarta LRT		
Rail Alphabet	British Rail; British Airports Authority; DSB; NHS; Road signs in Iran	Designed for British Rail in 1964. Still in use on parts of the UK rail network, but mostly superseded elsewhere.	
Rail Alphabet 2	United Kingdom railway stations	An evolution of Rail Alphabet commissioned by Network Rail and planned for use on new station signage projects from 2020 onwards	
Road UA	Road signs in Ukraine (since 2021)	Created by Andriy Konstantinov.	
Roadgeek 2000	Argentina	Based on the FHWA Series typeface (B, C, D and E only)	
Roboto	LRT Jakarta; MRT Jakarta; SEPTA Metro	Used in LRT Jakarta and MRT Jakarta on both physical (before 2021, now replaced altogether with PT Sans under Jak Lingko initiative) and digital signages on existing rolling stock First SEPTA Metro signage installed in 2024	
Rodin (ロダン)	Japanese and English signage: Echizen Railway, Hitachinaka Seaside Railway; Japanese signage: Amagi Railway, Keifuku Electric Railroad (Randen)		
Rodoviária	Road signs in Portugal (prior to 1998)	Typeface very similar to the Transport typeface, combined with FHWA Series	
Roman Minchō (浪漫明朝)	Japanese signage: Kumagawa Railway		
Rotis Sans Serif	English signage: Metropolitan Intercity Railway Company (Tsukuba Express), Yokohama Minatomirai Railway (Minatomirai Line) Minatomirai, Nihon-ōdōri and Shin-takashima Stations		
Rotis Semi Sans	Bilbao Metro; English signage: Sagami Railway (Sōtetsu)	Used by its own creator, Otl Aicher, for the corporate design of Metro Bilbao	
Rotis Semi Serif	Station signs of Sound Transit		
Rotis Serif	Street signposts in Singapore		
Ruta CL	Road signs in Chile	Derived from FHWA, in use since 2015.	
Ryūmin (リュウミン)	Japanese signage: Yokohama Minatomirai Railway (Minatomirai Line) Bashamichi Station		
Seoul Type	Seoul Metropolitan Government	Developed by the Seoul Metropolitan Government in 2008 for usage in official Seoul Metropolitan Government documents and institutions, signage and public transport within Seoul. The structure was designed to resemble the gradual curves of a traditional hanok roof.	
Seurat (スーラ)	Japanese and English signage: Hokuriku Railroad (Hokutetsu), Minamiaso Railway, Nishi-Nippon Railroad (Nishitetsu), Wakasa Railway; Japanese signage: Kumamoto Electric Railway, Shibayama Railway, Toyohashi Railroad (Toyotetsu)		
Shin Go (新ゴ)	Japanese and English signage: Aichi Loop Line (Aikan), Akechi Railway, Fukui Railway, Fukushima Transportation, Izukyū Corporation (Izu Kyūkō), Keiō Corporation, Kita-Osaka Kyūkō Railway (Kitakyū), Shimabara Railway, Tarumi Railway, Ueda Electric Railway; Japanese signage: Many (more than 50) Japanese railway operators (Note: Used in Aichi Rapid Transit (Linimo), Alpico Kōtsū, Aoimori Railway, Chichibu Railway, Echigo Tokimeki Railway, Enoshima Electric Railway (Enoden), Fukuoka City Subway, Hiroshima Electric Railway (Hiroden), Hokuetsu Express, Izuhakone Railway, JR East, JR Hokkaidō, JR Kyūshū, JR Shikoku, JR West, Kagoshima City Tram, Keihan Electric Railway, Keikyū Corporation, Kumamoto City Tram, Matsuura Railway, Metropolitan Intercity Railway Company (Tsukuba Express), Nagaragawa Railway, Nagoya Municipal Subway, Nagoya Railroad (Meitetsu), Odakyū Electric Railway, Osaka Monorail, Ryūtetsu, Saitama Railway, Sangi Railway, Sanriku Railway, Sanyō Electric Railway, Shigaraki Kohgen Railway, Shōnan Monorail, South Hokkaidō Railway, Takamatsu-Kotohira Electric Railroad (Kotoden), Tama Toshi Monorail, Tōbu Railway, Toden Arakawa Line, Toei Subway, Tokyo Metro, Tokyo Monorail, Tōkyū Corporation, Tosaden Kōtsū, Toyama Chihō Railway (Toyamakō Line), Watarase Keikoku Railway, Willer Trains (Kyoto Tango Railway, Tantetsu), Yokohama Minatomirai Railway (Minatomirai Line) Minatomirai, Nihon-ōdōri and Shin-takashima Stations, Yokohama Seaside Line (Kanazawa Seaside Line), and Yōrō Railway.)	A Gothic typeface released by Morisawa in 1990, it is currently the most widely used typeface for railway signage in Japan. It is used by many Japanese railway operators, including all Japan Railways (JR) companies except JR Central.	
Shin Maru Go (新丸ゴ)	Japanese and English signage: Chōshi Electric Railway, Hokusō Railway, Iga Railway; English signage: Tsugaru Railway		
Shūei Shogō Minchō (秀英初号明朝)	Japanese signage: Hakodate City Tram		
SimpleKölnBonn	Cologne Bonn Airport	Adaption of the Simple typeface from Norm (graphic design group). Commissioned by Intégral Ruedi Baur for their work on the airport's corporate design, which included the development of a large set of visually matching pictograms.	
Sispos and Sisneg	Sweden	Designed by Bo Berndal – old Swedish standard (SIS 030011, 1973) for public road signs, displays, etc.	
SL Gothic	Stockholm transit system		
Smalt	Street signs in Prague		
SNV	Road signs in Belgium; Road signs in Bulgaria; Road signs in Luxembourg; Road signs in Romania; Road signs in countries of the former Yugoslavia; Road signs in Switzerland (until 2003)		
Source Han Sans	Traditional Chinese for road traffic signage in Taiwan		
Standard (also known as Akzidenz-Grotesk)	New York City subway signs	Sometimes seen on older New York City subway signs. Was sometimes used in place of Helvetica.	
Sumi Maru Gothic (スミ丸ゴシック)	Japanese signage: JR Central (non-Shinkansen), JR-Central Transport Service (TKJ)	A typeface developed and used by the former Japanese National Railways (JNR). Today, it is used exclusively by the JR Central Group.	
TB Gothic (TBゴシック)	Japanese signage: Nagoya Rinkai Rapid Transit (Aonami Line), Yokohama Municipal Subway		
Tern	Road signs in Austria; Road signs in Slovakia	Developed by the International Institute for Information Design with the aim of unifying the road signage in all of the European Union.	
Times New Roman	Station signage for MARTA		
Tipografía México	Road signs in Mexico	Replaced former typeface based on FHWA Series that was used on Mexican road signs before 2023.	
Toronto Subway	Toronto Transit Commission	Used in maps, publications, and most stations of the Toronto subway	
Trafikkalfabetet	Road signs in Norway	Used for Norwegian road signs and motor vehicle registration plates (until 2006)	
Transport	Road signs in the United Kingdom; Road signs in Malta; Road signs in Bangladesh; Road signs in Hong Kong; Road signs in India; Road signs in Iran; Road signs in Ireland; Road signs in Nepal; Road signs in Portugal	Also used in Portugal, Greece (for non-motorways) and other countries. An oblique variant is used in Ireland for Irish-language text.	
Tratex	Road signs in Sweden		
TS Info and TS Mapa	Transantiago	Created by the DET (Departamento de Estudios Tipográficos, Universidad Católica de Chile) for the Transantiago, the public transport network in Santiago de Chile.	
UD Shin Go (UD新ゴ)	Japanese and English signage: Okinawa Urban Monorail (Yui Rail), Yokkaichi Asunarou Railway; English signage: Saitama New Urban Transit (New Shuttle)		
UD Shin Maru Go (UD新丸ゴ)	Japanese and English signage: Akina Nairiku Jūkan Railway, Ichibata Electric Railway		
Univers	Toronto Transit Commission; Montreal Metro; English signage: Kyoto Municipal Subway (Karasuma Line), Nankai Electric Railway, Tokyo Waterfront Area Rapid Transit (Rinkai Line), Wakayama Electric Railway, Yokohama Minatomirai Railway (Minatomirai Line) Motomachi-Chūkagai Station, Yurikamome; Hong Kong International Airport; Frankfurt Airport (Univers Condensed)	Also used for the Walt Disney World road system (route numbers are in Highway Gothic). Also used in English translations of certain road/street signage in China, alongside Highway Gothic. Formerly used by the Nederlandse Spoorwegen, on the destination rolls of Comeng trains in Melbourne prior to refurbishment, as well as Hitachi trains which had their original destination rolls replaced in the 1980s with the Comeng type. Univers diacritics used on Quebec road signs written in Highway Gothic, since those are not supported by it.	
Universal Grotesk	Road signs in Czechoslovakia	Previously used on road signs in Slovakia until 2015.	
Vectora	Expressway route numbers in Japan		
Verdana	English signage: Alpico Kōtsū, Eizan Electric Railway, Hanshin Electric Railway		
Vialog	Renfe; English signage: Odakyū Electric Railway; English signage: Japanese expressway directional signage	Used in signage and all corporate communications of the state-owned Spanish Railway Operator in a custom-made variant called Renfe Vialog.	
Wayfinding Sans	Metro Rio; El Dorado International Airport; Santa Cruz; Kereta Api Indonesia (December 2016–20)	Used in signage for Rio de Janeiro's metro system Metro Rio, El Dorado International Airport, the city of Santa Cruz, California and Indonesian Railway Company.	
Yū Gothic (游ゴシック)	Japanese signage: Hiroshima Rapid Transit (Astram Line)		

== See also ==
- Typefaces used on North American traffic signs
- Road signs in Australia
- Road signs in Belgium
- Road signs in Japan
- Road signs in Thailand
