= Esseltub =

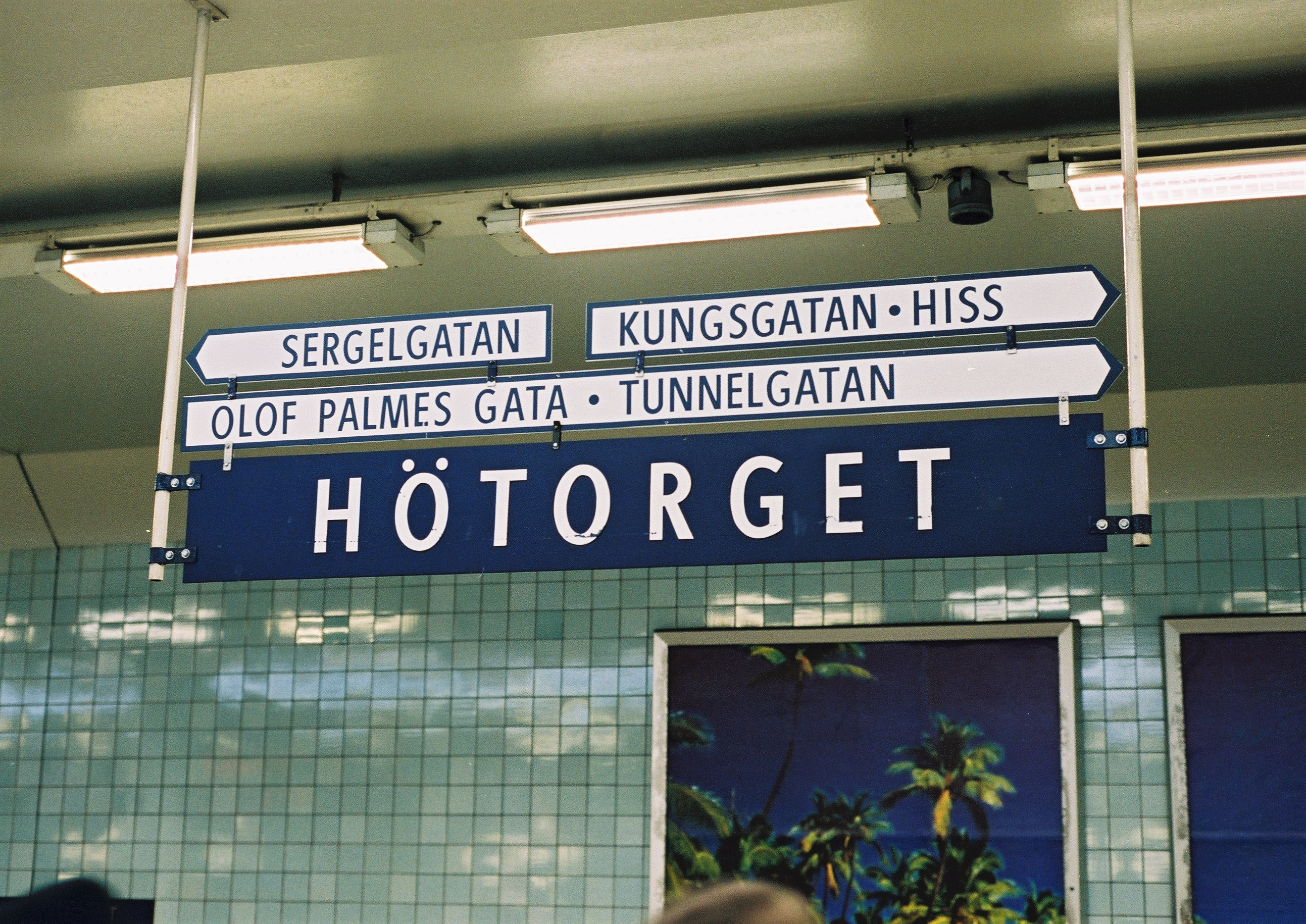
- Category: Sans-serif
- Designer: Stig-Åke Möller
- Also known as: SS-grotesk and SL-grotesk

Esseltub (sometimes called Esseltube) is the name of a typeface family formerly used in the Stockholm Metro. It was designed by Stig-Åke Möller and was originally called SS-grotesk and SL-grotesk before being digitalised by Bo Berndal.

Prior to being replaced by Helvetica in the 1980s with black and white signs and later by Veolia Transport using a font called SL Nova, it was used on signs at the Stockholm Metro.

== See also ==
- Public signage typefaces
