= Brusseline =

Humanist sans-serif typeface

- Category: Sans-serif
- Designer: Eric de Berranger
- Date created: 2006

Brusseline is a custom typeface developed in 2006 by Eric de Berranger for the signage of the Brussels Intercommunal Transport Company (STIB/MIVB), managing metro, premetro, tram, and bus services. The typeface started being used on the network in 2007 as part of a company image campaign. The name is inspired by Parisine, the typeface of Paris’ public transport network.

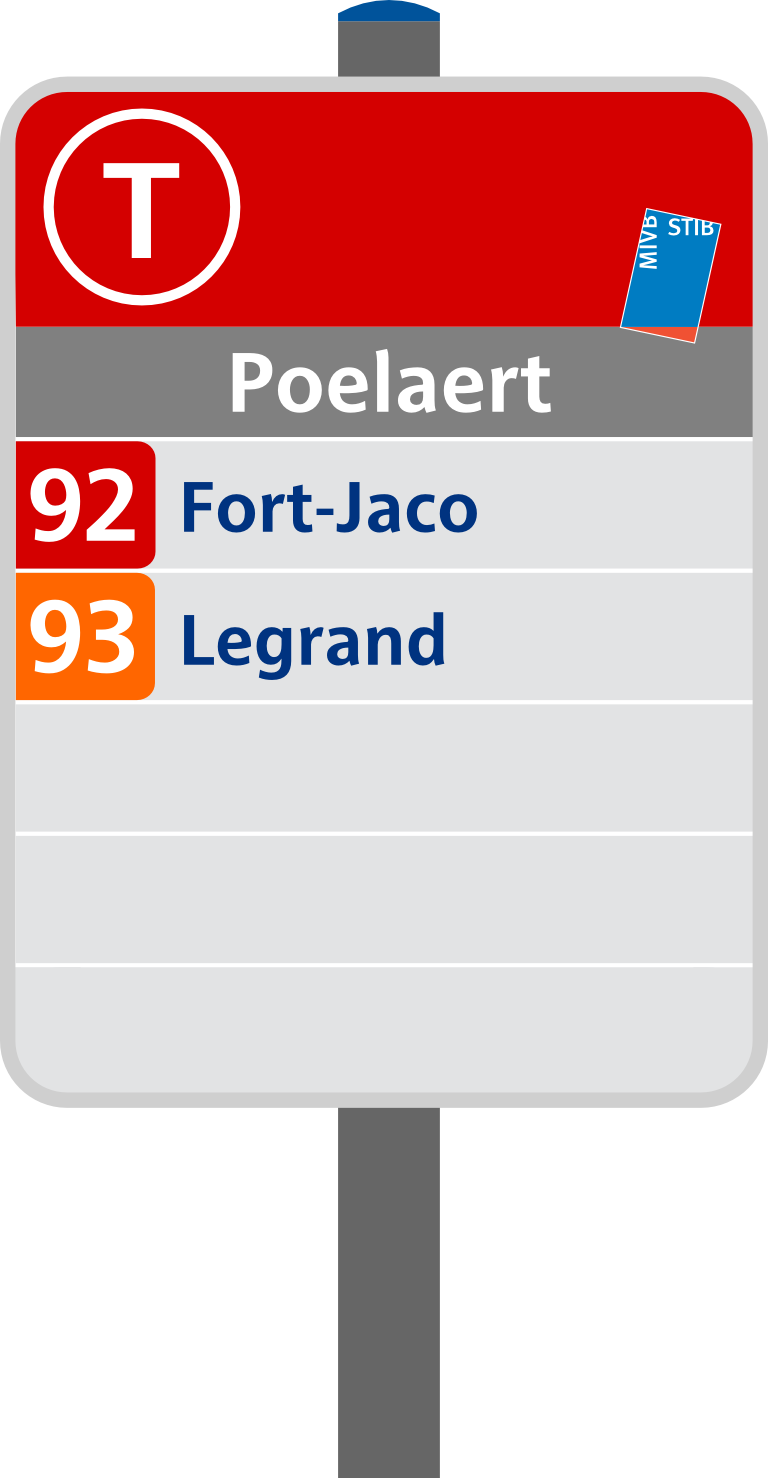
Brusseline used on a sign at the Poelaert tram stop

== See also ==
- Public signage typefaces
