= Trafikkalfabetet =

Geometric sans-serif typeface

- Category: Sans-serif
- Classification: Geometric
- Designer(s): Karl Petter Sandbæk
- Foundry: Vegvesenet
- Date released: 1965
- Design based on: DIN 1451

Trafikkalfabetet (English: The Traffic Alphabet) is a sans-serif typeface used for road signs and, until 2002, vehicle registration plates in Norway. Developed in 1965 by Karl Petter Sandbæk, it was digitized in 2006 by Jacob Øvergaard.

== Gallery ==
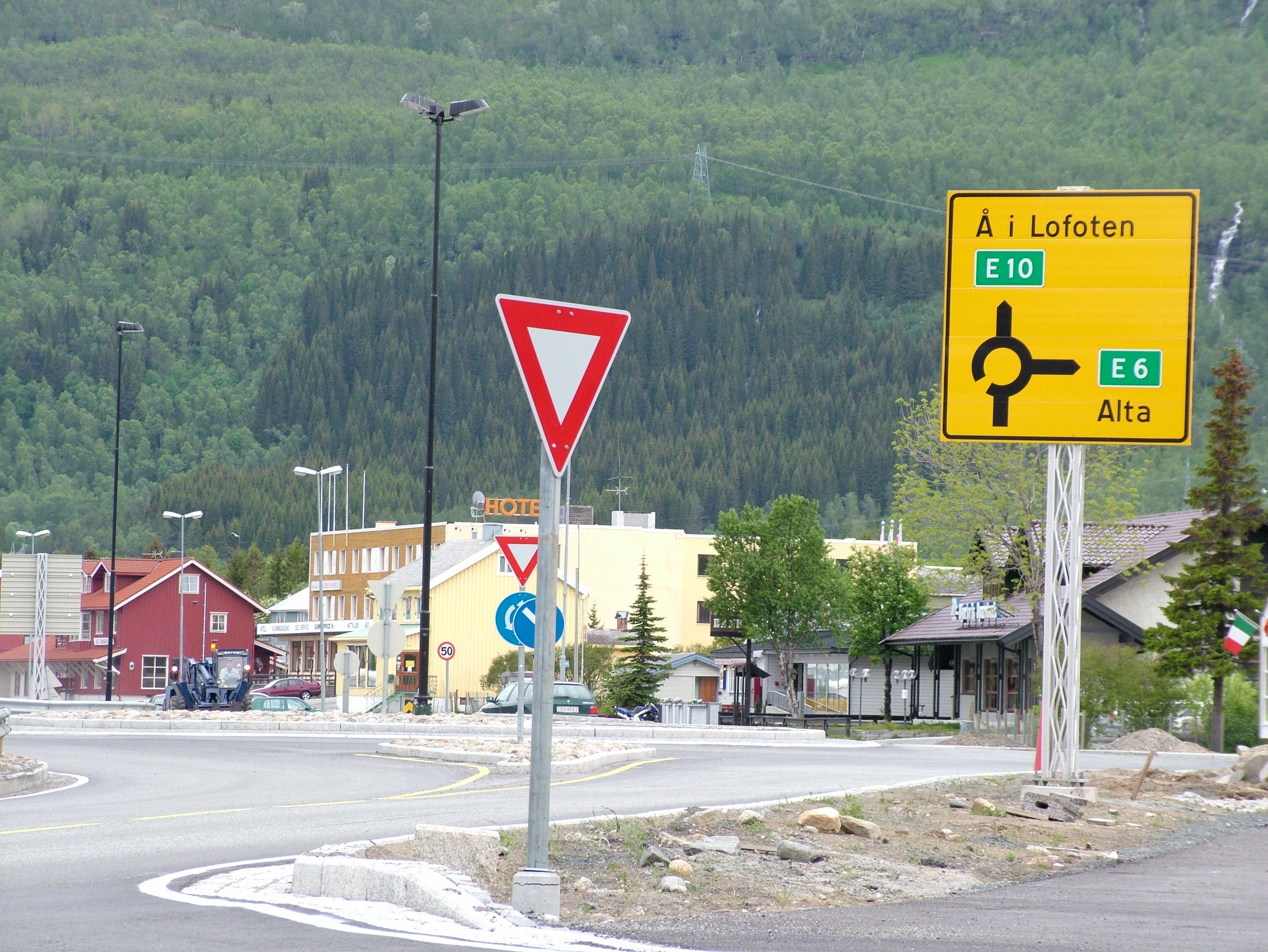
On a road sign

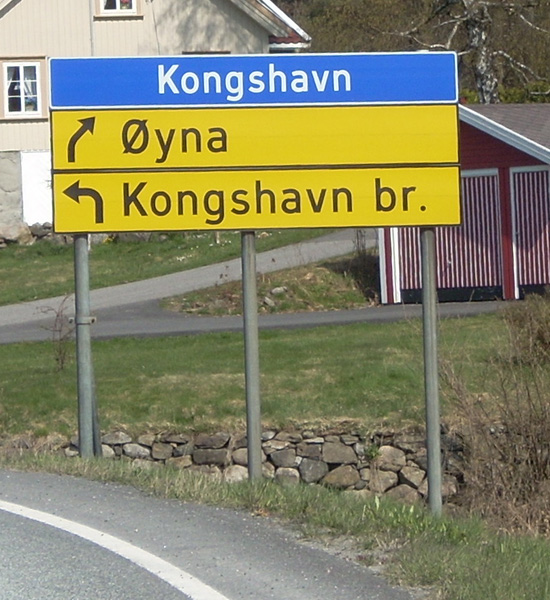
On a road sign

== See also ==
- Public signage typefaces
