= Road signs in Hong Kong =

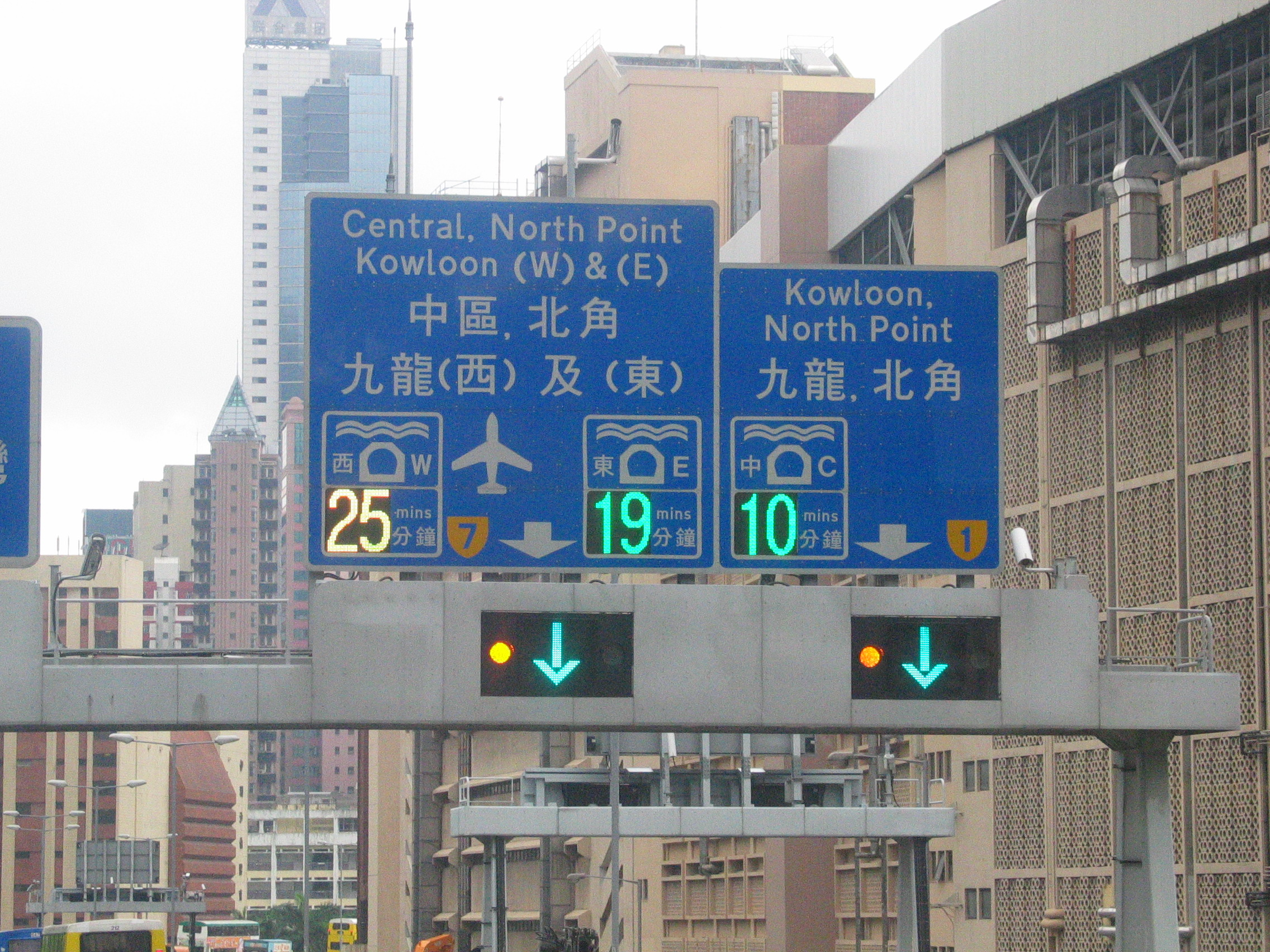
Road signs near Aberdeen Tunnel of Hong Kong

Road signs in Hong Kong are standardised by the Transport Department. Having previously been a British territory, the road signage in Hong Kong is similar to that of the United Kingdom, with the addition of Traditional Chinese characters.

== Design and language ==
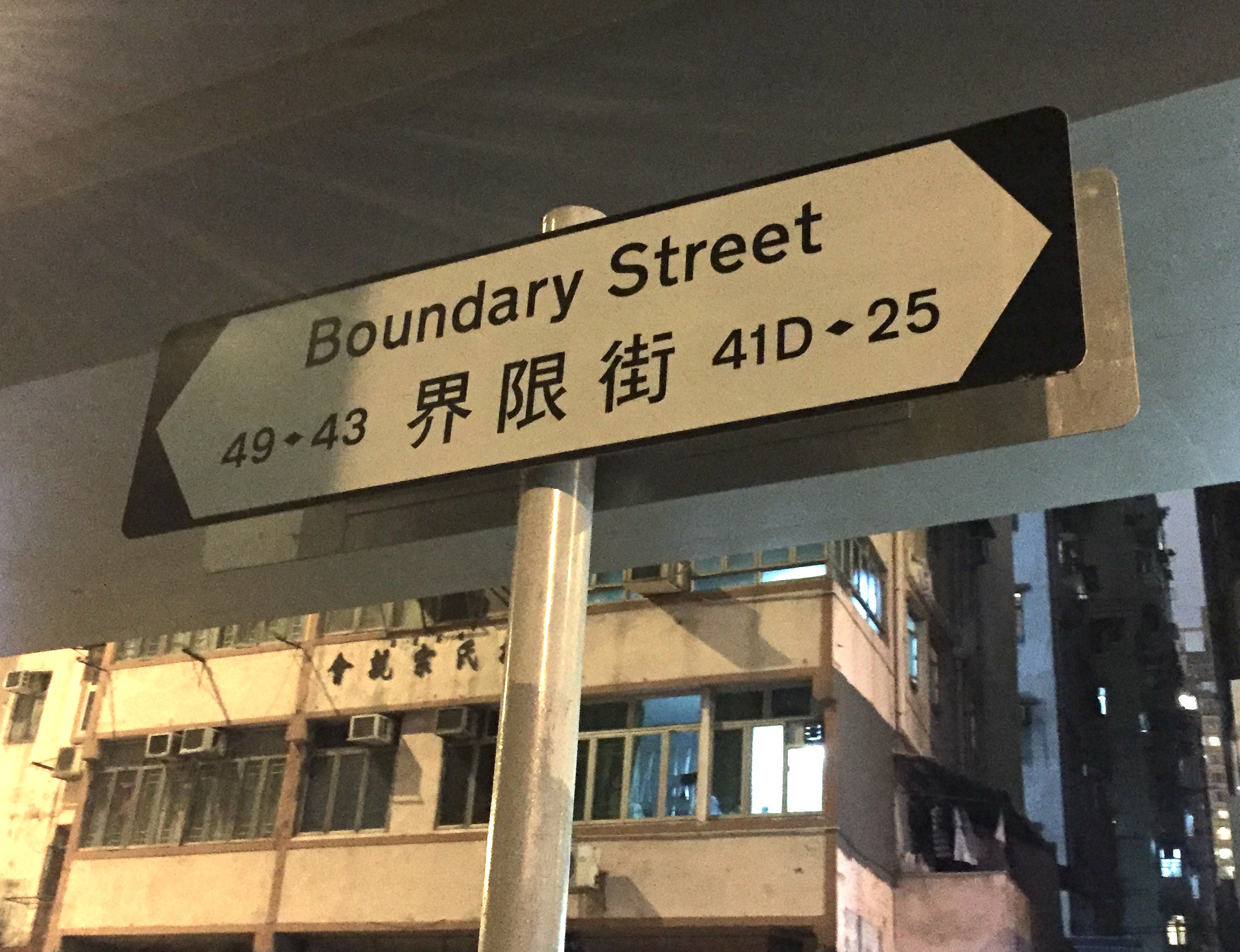
Latest road signs with Transport typeface (2015)

Road signs in Hong Kong closely follow those used in the United Kingdom, and complies with the Vienna Convention on Road Signs and Signals, a legacy of the city's previous British overseas territory status. Signs normally use the Transport Medium typeface on dark backgrounds or Transport Heavy on light backgrounds, which is identical to the use in the United Kingdom, and many current and former British Overseas Territories.

Road signs placed in the 2000s to 2010s commonly use Arial Narrow or Helvetica, with or without a modified letter 'l'; street signs sometimes also use Helvetica. The newest signs built after 2016 have increasingly resumed the use of the Transport typeface; some signs on recently completed expressways use Transport Heavy on dark backgrounds.

Traffic signs are typically in English and Chinese (in traditional Chinese characters), the two official languages of Hong Kong, with English displayed above Chinese.

Since 1984, arrows (including some without barbs) are identical to their British counterparts used on some signs. Between 1973 and 1984, arrows are identical to their Ugandan counterparts used on some signs such as Turn Left, No Right Turn or One-way Traffic. Prior to 1973, signs were in the pre-Worboys style with a couple of differences.

== Warning ==
Signs warning of hazardous conditions or dangerous situations (e.g. "Intersection" or "Steep incline ahead" bear a black-on-white symbol inside a red-bordered triangle (point uppermost).

Stop or give way ahead (with distance to line ahead given below)

Distance to 'Give way' line

Distance to 'Stop' line

Bend to left ahead (right if symbol reversed)

Double bend ahead first to right (symbol may be reversed)

Dual carriageway ends ahead

Roundabout ahead (symbol may be reversed)

Road narrows on right ahead (left if symbol reversed)

Road narrows on both sides ahead

Reduce speed now

Sharp deviation of route to left (may be used with amber border, right if symbol reversed)

Traffic lights ahead

Steep hill upwards ahead (symbol may be reversed)

Steep hill downwards ahead (symbol may be reversed)

Use low gear

Use low gear for distance shown

Keep in low gear

Single file traffic ahead

Cyclists to keep left

Cyclists to walk on steep road

Traffic accident blackspot ahead

Pedestrian accident blackspot ahead

Cross roads ahead

Staggered junction ahead (symbol may be reversed)

Side road to right ahead (left if symbol reversed)

T-junction ahead (symbol may be reversed)

Traffic merging from left (right if symbol reversed)

Merging into main traffic on right (left if symbol reversed)

Overhead electric cable ahead

Disabled persons ahead

Visually impaired persons ahead

Level crossing with barrier ahead

Quay-side or river bank ahead

Restricted headroom ahead

Pedestrian crossing ahead

Children ahead

Risk of falling or fallen rocks ahead (symbol may be reversed)

Horses ahead

Cattle ahead

Fog or mist ahead

Bus lane ahead (Franchised buses)

Bus lane ahead (Franchised buses)

Bus lane (Franchised buses) on major road ahead

Warning to pedestrians crossing road with bus lane

Light rail vehicles or trams ahead

Light rail vehicle lane or tram lane ahead

Light rail vehicle lane or tram lane on major road ahead

Pedestrians on or crossing road ahead

Cycleway ahead (cyclists on or crossing road ahead)

Cyclists ahead

Low-flying aircraft or noise ahead

Uneven road surface ahead

Road hump ahead

Two-way traffic across a one-way road ahead (symbol may be reversed)

Two-way traffic ahead (symbol may be reversed)

Red light/speed camera ahead

Red light camera control zone

Plate used to state the safe height

School ahead

Playground ahead

Distance as shown to hazard

Distance as shown to hazard

Pedestrians Ahead

== Regulatory ==
With the exception of the special shapes used for "Stop" and "Give Way" signs (respectively, an octagon and a downward-pointing triangle), signs giving orders are circular and are of two kinds:

Prohibitory signs (e.g. "No left turn") take the form of a black-on-white symbol inside a red-bordered circle, sometimes with the addition of a red slash through the symbol. Mandatory signs (e.g. "Turn right only") bear a white symbol on a blue disk.

Give way

Stop and give way

Ahead only

Keep left (right if symbol reversed)

Turn left (right if symbol reversed)

Turn left at junction ahead (right if symbol reversed)

No stopping

No parking

No entry for all vehicles

One way traffic

Vehicles must stop at the sign (sign used by police)

Vehicles must stop at the sign (sign used by school crossing patrol)

No lane changing

Segregated pedestrian and bicycle/tricycle route. No motor vehicles (symbols may be reversed)

Bicycle/tricycle route. No motor vehicles

Cycling restriction – cyclists must dismount and push their cycles

End of cycling restriction

Light rail vehicles and trams only

Dual carriageway ahead

Direction in which the prohibition or restriction applies (symbol may be reversed)

Prohibition or restriction applies in both directions

Prohibition or mandatory order applies to vehicle class shown

One way road ahead

No stopping between 7AM-12AM

No stopping between 7AM-7PM

No stopping between 8-10AM and 5-7PM

No stopping at any time

End of 'no stopping' restriction

No stopping for public light buses between 7AM-12AM

End of public light buses 'no stopping' restriction

Restriction does not apply to vehicle classes shown to pick up or drop off passengers (wording may be varied to loading/unloading goods)

Pedestrian priority zone

Vehicles prohibited as indicated by supplementary plate

No motor vehicles

No motor vehicles except motor cyclists and motor tricycles

No motor cycles or motor tricycles

No buses and coaches

No public light buses

No goods vehicles

No learner drivers

No left-turn (No right-turn if symbol reversed)

No U-turn (symbol may be reversed)

No pedestrians

No pedestrians, rickshaws and handcarts

No pedestrians, pedestrian controlled vehicles, bicycles and tricycles

No bicycles

No use of horn

No overtaking

No vehicles over width shown (including load)

No vehicles or combinations of vehicles over length shown (including load)

No vehicles over height shown (including load)

No vehicles over gross vehicle weight shown (including load)

No vehicles over axle weight shown (including load)

Speed limit (in km/h)

Variable speed limit (in km/h)

Prohibitation does not apply to vehicles gaining access to premises adjacent to the road

Prohibitation does not apply to vehicles holding relevant licenses

Prohibitation or mandatory order applies to vehicles over the length shown

Prohibitation or mandatory order applies to vehicles over the gross vehicle weight shown

Prohibitation or mandatory order does not apply to vehicle classes shown

Time plate

Time plate

Day plate

Prohibitation or mandatory order does not apply to vehicle classes and time shown

Length over which the prohibition or hazard exists

End of the prohibition, restriction or warning

Left lane shows bus lane for franchised buses only during the time and date shown

Bus lane for franchised buses only (direction may be reversed)

Contra-flow bus lane for franchised buses only (direction may be reversed)

End of bus lane

End of tram only lane

End of rail only lane for light rail vehicles

No vehicles carrying dangerous goods of specified categories

Indicating the categories of dangerous goods

Parking place for vehicles other than medium and heavy goods vehicles, buses, coaches, motor cycles and pedal cycles

Parking place for goods vehicles only

Parking place for buses and coaches only

Parking place for motor cycles only

Parking place for pedal cycles only

Start and continuation of an expressway

End of an expressway

Taxi stand

End of New Territories taxis operating area

End of Lantau taxis operating area

Green minibus stand

Red minibus stand

Vehicles must use the left most lane except when overtaking

Vehicles must use the right most lane except when overtaking

Hard shoulder – do not use except in an emergency

Cyclists must dismount and use crossing to cross the road

Way out for vehicles

No exit for vehicles

Way in for vehicles

No entry for vehicles

== Temporary/Construction ==
Temporary road signs (e.g. Red rectangular signs with instructions in white)

Right lane closed ahead (Red bar indicates that lanes are closed) (symbol may be reversed)

Right lane closed ahead (Red bar indicates that lanes are closed) (symbol may be reversed)

Left lane only ahead (Red bar indicates that lanes are closed) (symbol may be reversed)

Left lane only ahead on two-way road (Red bar indicates that lanes are closed) (symbol may be reversed)

Middle lane closed ahead (Red bar indicates that lanes are closed) (symbol may be reversed)

Road works ahead

Divert to another carriageway to right ahead (direction may be reversed)

Keep right (keep left if symbol reversed)

Vehicles may pass either side to reach same destination

Road narrows on left ahead (right if symbol reversed)

End of road works

Used to indicate line painting (wording may be varied to suit nature of road work)

Temporary closure of lane or road

Temporary sharp deviation to left (right if symbol reversed)

Manually operated ʻStop/Goʼ sign ahead

Manually operated temporary ʻStopʼ sign

Manually operated temporary ʻGoʼ sign

Ramp or sudden change of road level ahead

Ramp or sudden change of road level

Temporary traffic cylinder

Traffic signals ahead

Road ahead closed to vehicles

Road closed to vehicles

Temporary routes for vehicles

Temporary route for pedestrians (arrow may be reversed)

Temporary route for pedestrians (both directions)

Used with temporary traffic signals. Vehicles must not proceed beyond the sign when red light shows.

Temporary closure of pedestrian crossing

Slippery road ahead

Loose chippings ahead

Uneven road surface ahead

Slow (Sign used by police in emergency)

Warn of road surfacing works (wording may be varied to suit specific hazard)

Other danger ahead (used with plate to describe the hazard)

Plate describing the hazard (wording maybe varied)

Single file traffic ahead (wording may be varied to 'Single track road')

== Guide ==
Guide signs are generally rectangular (sometimes pointed at one end in the case of direction signage).

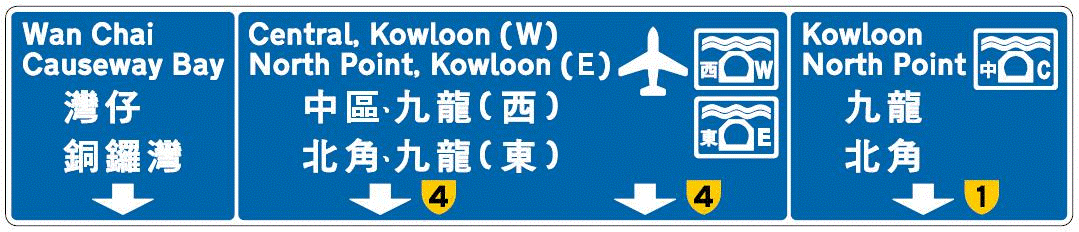
Symbols for the three cross-harbour tunnels are marked with E, C and W to indicate the directions to the Eastern Harbour Crossing, Cross-Harbour Tunnel and Western Harbour Crossing respectively. The arrow below the destinations points to the lane for these destinations, and you should select your destination and get in appropriate lane. The middle two lanes can equally lead you to all destinations shown in the middle panel.
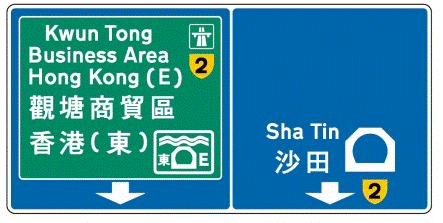
On busy roads, signs may be placed on gantries above the roads. (The panel on the right indicates the lane to Sha Tin through a road tunnel.) The arrow below the destinations points to the lane for these destinations, and you should select your destination and get in appropriate lane.

Advance direction signs for a roundabout showing the exit arrangement. Exit to expressway or local destination is shown in green or white background respectively.
Chainage marker to give position along strategic routes. (On major trunk roads, the signs are in blue background; on expressways, the signs are in green.)

Pointed direction sign

Route number along strategic route

Tunnel ahead

Hong Kong Cross Harbour Tunnel

Western Harbour Tunnel

Eastern Harbour Tunnel

Urban taxi pick up and drop off only

New Territories taxi pick up and drop off only

Lantau taxi pick up and drop off only

Direction to parking place (direction may be reversed)

Direction to vehicular ferry pier

Direction to Mass Transit Railway (MTR) Station

Vehicles may pass either side to reach same destination

No through road

No through road on left

No through road on right

300m Countdown markers used to indicate the distance to an exit on the left side of a road (Background in green if on expressway) (symbols may be reversed to indicate exit on right)

200m Countdown markers used to indicate the distance to an exit on the left side of a road (Background in green if on expressway) (symbols may be reversed to indicate exit on right)

100m Countdown markers used to indicate the distance to an exit on the left side of a road (Background in green if on expressway) (symbols may be reversed to indicate exit on right)

Sign showing lane indication arrows for each lane or temporary lane closure at junction ahead

Start of dual carriageway ahead

Passing place

Private road

Sign at start of single track road

For use by police at accident site

Prepare to stop if signalled to do so

Stop at census point

Census point

Get in lane

Street direction sign

Street direction sign with numbers

== Obsolete ==
=== Post-Worboys ===
Two-way traffic ahead

Roundabout ahead

Ahead only

Keep left (right if symbol reversed)

Turn left (right if symbol reversed)

Turn left at junction ahead (right if symbol reversed)

Vehicles may pass either side to reach same destination

No left-turn (No right-turn if symbol reversed)

No U-turn (symbol may be reversed)

Speed limit in kilometres per hour (km/h)

One-way traffic

Level crossing light signal

=== Pre-Worboys ===
Warning Triangle

Red Disk

Red Ring

Triangle in Ring

No Cycling

One Way Only

Pedestrian Crossing

Turn Left

Turn Left, One Way Only

Turn Right

Turn Right, One Way Only

No Through Road for Motor Vehicles

No Entry

Speed Limit

National Speed Limit Applies

Parking

No Waiting

No Entry

Halt at Major Road Ahead

Slow, Major Road Ahead
