= Road signs in Bangladesh =

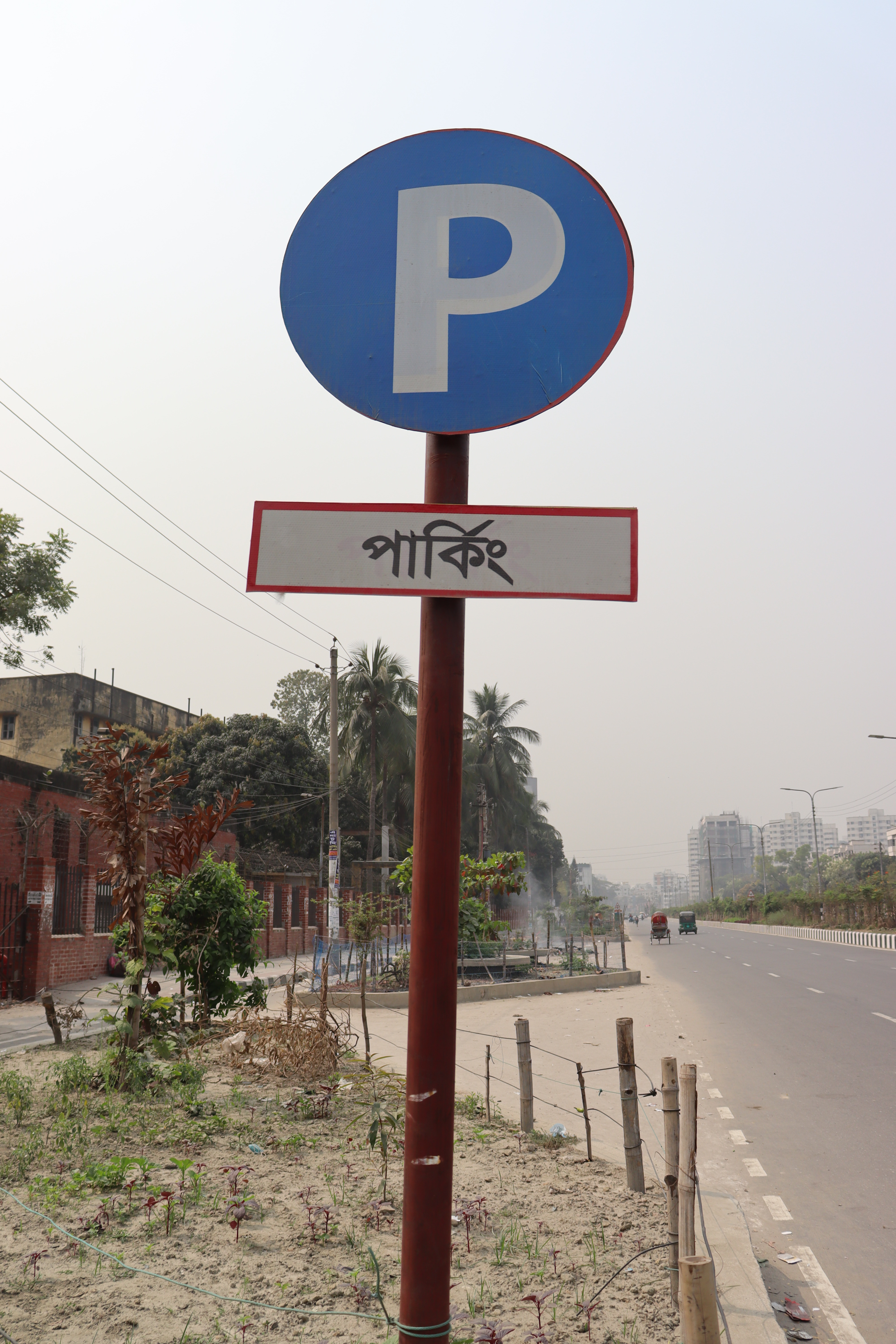
Parking sign in Dhaka

Road signs in Bangladesh are laid out in the Traffic Signs Manual published by the Bangladesh Road Transport Authority.

== Regulatory signs ==
Stop and give way

Give way

No entry

No motor vehicles

No trucks

No handcarts

No animal-drawn vehicles

No pedestrians

No rickshaws

No pedal cycles

No tractors or slow moving vehicles

No vehicles carrying explosives

No vehicles over length shown

No vehicles over height shown

No vehicles over width shown

No vehicles over maximum gross weight shown

Axle weight limit

No parking

No stopping

No overtaking

No passing without stopping

No right turn

No left turn

No U-turn

No use of horn

Speed limit

End of speed limit

Temporary stop sign

Temporary go sign

Restriction ends

Ahead only

Turn left

Turn right

Keep left

Keep right

Turn left ahead

Turn right ahead

Mini roundabout

Pass either side

One way traffic

One way street

One way street

Route for rickshaws only

Route for pedal cycles only

== Warning signs ==
Crossroad with a minor road ahead

Crossroad with a major road ahead

Side road on the left ahead

Side road on the right ahead

Staggered junction ahead

Staggered junction ahead

T-junction ahead

Y-junction ahead

Traffic merges from left

Traffic merges onto carriageway

Roundabout ahead

Sharp bend to the left ahead

Sharp bend to the right ahead

Hairpin bend to the left ahead

Hairpin bend to the right ahead

Double bend ahead first to the left

Double bend ahead first to the right

Sharp bend to the left ahead

Sharp bend to the right ahead

Sharp bend to the left

Sharp bend to the right

Road narrows on both sides

Road narrows on left sides

Road narrows on right sides

Dual carriage way ends ahead

Traffic signals ahead

Steep hill downwards ahead

Steep hill upwards ahead

Height limit ahead

Two way traffic straight ahead

Two way traffic crosses one way road

Pedestrian crossing ahead

Pedestrians in road ahead

Children ahead

Cattle ahead

Wild animals ahead

Unproteceted quayside or riverbank ahead

Uneven road

Slippery road surface ahead

Road hump

Low-flying aircraft ahead

Falling rocks

Falling rocks

Dangerous dip

Narrow bridge ahead

Other danger ahead

Checkpoint ahead

Roadworks ahead

Loose chippings

Cycles and rickshaws

Dangerous shoulder

Ferry

Blind persons

Railway level crossing without gate or barrier

Railway level crossing with gate or barrier

Countdown markers

Countdown markers

Countdown markers

Countdown markers

Countdown markers

Countdown markers

Single track railway crossing

Multiple track railway crossing

T-junction chevron

Single sided Dangerous obstruction right

Single sided dangerous obstruction left

Double sided dangerous obstruction

Temporary diversion ahead

Layout of temporary traffic diversion ahead

Direction of temporary diversion

direction of temporary diversion

Lane closed to traffic ahead (temporary)

Sharp change of chevron to the left

Sharp change of chevron to the right

Sharp Change of multiplayer chevron to the left

Sharp change of multiplayer chevron the right

Delineator post

== Indication signs ==
No through road

Pedestrian crossing

Parking place

Overnight accommodation

First-aid post

Hospital

Picnic site

Mosque

Temple

Church

Fireplace

Toilet

Route for pedestrians or cycles rickshaws

Route for cycles rickshaws

Bus stop

Taxi stop

Police station

Toll road or bridge

Place identification sign

Exit from built-up area

Pedestrian route

Advance Direction Sign (map-type – national highways)

Advance direction sign (stack-type – national highways)

Advance direction sign (stack-type – minor routes)

Advance direction sign (mounted overhead)

Direction sign (national highways)

Direction sign (minor routes)

Direction sign (temporary diversion)

Route confirmation sign (national highways)

== Additional signs ==
Distance

Distance over which hazard or restriction extends

School

Except buses

Flooding

Single track road

Stop

Give way

Single track bridge

Road closed

Accident

Speed limit

One way

Dual carriageway

No parking

Time period

No entry

End

Cars

Truck

Buses

Scooters or motorcycles

Auto rickshaws

Bicycles

Cycle rickshaws

Left arrow

Right arrow

Disabilities

== Traffic signals ==
Rail crossing signals

Pedestrian signals
