= Road signs in Cambodia =

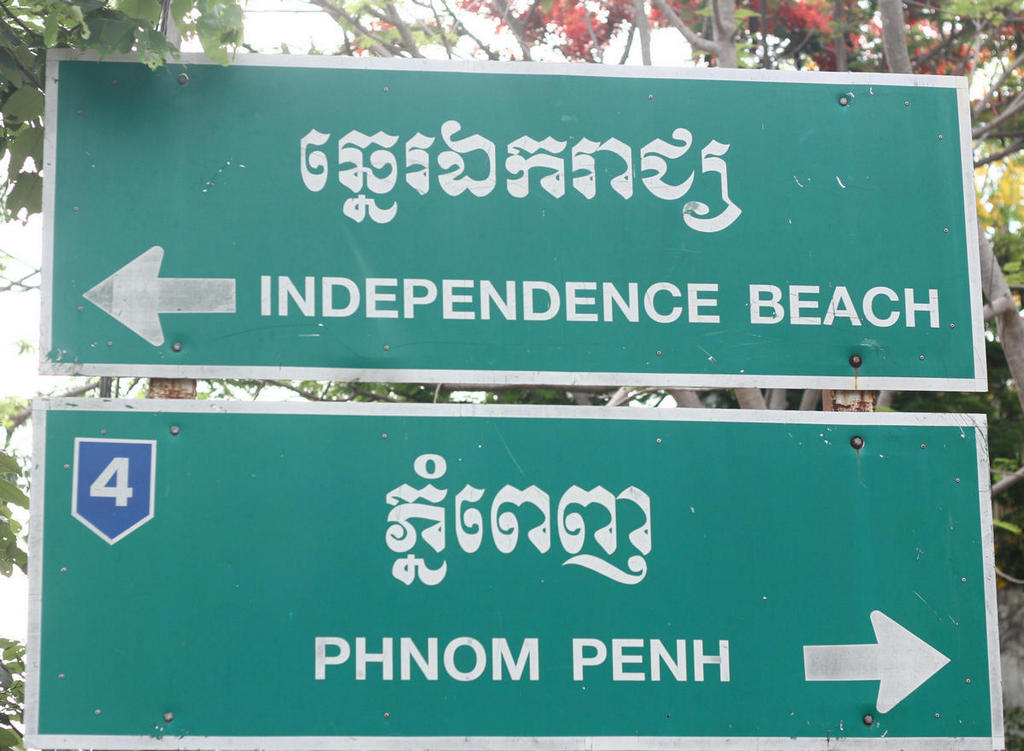
Road signs in Sihanoukville

Road signs in Cambodia (Khmer: ឧបសម្ព័ន្ធស្តីពីសញ្ញាចរាចរផ្លូវគោក) are standardized road signs similar to those used in Europe, but much of it resembles road signage systems used in South American countries with certain differences. The designs of road signage match their neighbours of Thailand and Malaysia, both of which adopt a modified version of the South American road signage system (despite both Thailand and Malaysia being part of Asia). Until the early 1980s, Cambodia closely followed American, European, Australian, and Japanese practices in road sign design, with diamond-shaped warning signs and circular restrictive signs to regulate traffic. Unlike Thailand and Malaysia, Cambodia does not use the FHWA Series fonts ("Highway Gothic") typeface, favouring Helvetica instead.

Cambodian traffic signs use Khmer, the national language of Cambodia, however, English is also used for stop and important public places such as tourist attractions, airports, railway stations, and immigration checkpoints. Both Khmer and English are used on directional signage. Cambodia signed the Vienna Convention on Road Signs and Signals, but has yet to ratify the convention.

== Prohibitory signs ==
Prohibitory signs

No left turn

No right turn

No U-turn

No entry

Closed for all vehicles

Closed for all road users

Total weight limit

Weight limit on one axle

Height limit

Width limit

Length limit

No bicycles, motorcycles and tricycles

No motorcycles

No cars

No trucks

No buses

No motor vehicles

No bicycles

No parking

No stopping

No parking from 1st to 15th day of the month

No parking from 16th to 31st day of the month

No parking on odd days

No parking on even days

No overtaking

End of overtaking prohibition

No overtaking for trucks

End of overtaking prohibition for trucks

No overtaking for trucks

End of prohibition overtaking for trucks

No honking

End of honking prohibition

No motorcycle-drawn carts

No animal-drawn carts

No carts

No tractors

No towed trailers

Minimum separation distance for cars

Minimum separation distance for trucks

No vehicles loading inflammable goods

Maximum speed limit

End of maximum speed limit

Stop at the customs station

Stop at the police station

Stop at the military police station

Speed limit 20 km/h

Speed limit 50 km/h

== Mandatory signs ==
Mandatory signs

Keep right

Keep left

Turn right ahead

Turn left ahead

Go straight or turn right.

Go straight or turn left

Turn right

Turn left

Turn left or right

Go straight

Cars only

Animal drawn carts of all form only

Pedestrians only

End of pedestrians only

Pedestrians and bicycles only

End of pedestrians and bicycles only

Minimum speed limit

End of minimum speed limit

Buses lane

End of buses lane

Bicycles only

End of bicycles only

Keep right

Slow down

== Priority signs ==
Priority signs

Stop (Khmer and English languages)

Stop

Give way

Give way (at roundabout)

Priority junction

Priority road

End of priority road

Give way to all traffic from the opposite direction

Priority over all traffic from the opposite direction

Single track railway crossing

Double triple railway crossing

== Warning signs ==
Warning signs

Other danger

Curve to the right

Curve to the left

Double curve first to the right

Double curve first to the left

Winding road

Skewed side road junction on the right

Skewed side road junction on the left

Y-junction ahead

T-junction ahead

Side road junction on the left

Side road junction on the left (different road classes)

Side road junction on the right

Side road junction on the right (different road classes)

Offset road junction, left and right

Offset road junction, left and right

Crossroad

Crossroad on the left (different road classes)

Crossroad on the right (different road classes)

Roundabout ahead

Two-way traffic

Road narrows on the both sides

Road narrows on the right

Road narrows on the left

Sharp curve to the right

Sharp curve to the left

Double sharp curve first to the right

Double sharp curve first to the left

Railway crossing on the right road

Railway crossing on the left road

Railway crossing with barrier or gates

Railway crossing without barrier or gates

Steep climb

Steep descent

Hump

Uneven road

Children

Pedestrian crossing

Handicapped crossing

Cattle or domestic animals

Deer or wild animals

Slippery road

Falling rocks

Loose road surface

Crosswinds

Traffic lights ahead

Stop signs ahead

Give way signs ahead

Divided roads begins

Divided roads ends

Low flying aircraft

Bicycles crossing

Unprotected quayside or riverbank ahead

Junction on a curve (different road classes)

Crossroad on a curve (different road classes)

Junction on a double curve (different road classes)

Crossroad on a double curve (different road classes)

== Temporary signs ==
Temporary signs

Workers ahead

Workers

Loose road surface

End road works

Detour to the right

Detour to the left

Traffic cone

Direction chevron to be followed

Temporary stop signs (Khmer and English languages)

Temporary go signs (without text)

Red-flag

== Direction signs ==
Direction signs

Direction sign to cities or provinces (at detour)

Direction sign to cities or provinces (at junction)

Direction sign to cities or provinces (at junction)

Direction sign to other areas (at detour)

Direction sign to other areas (at junction)

Guide sign to other places

Guide sign to other places

Directions to city or province

Weigh station

Weigh station

== Built-up area and boundary signs ==
Build up Area and Boundary signs

Built-up area begins

Built-up area ends

Provincial, district or commune boundary begins

Provincial, district or commune boundary ends

=== Street name signs ===
Street name signs

Preah Norodom Boulevard

Preah Trasak Paem Street

Kramuon Sar Avenue

Street No.113

Asian Highway route 1

Asian Highway route 11

National road number

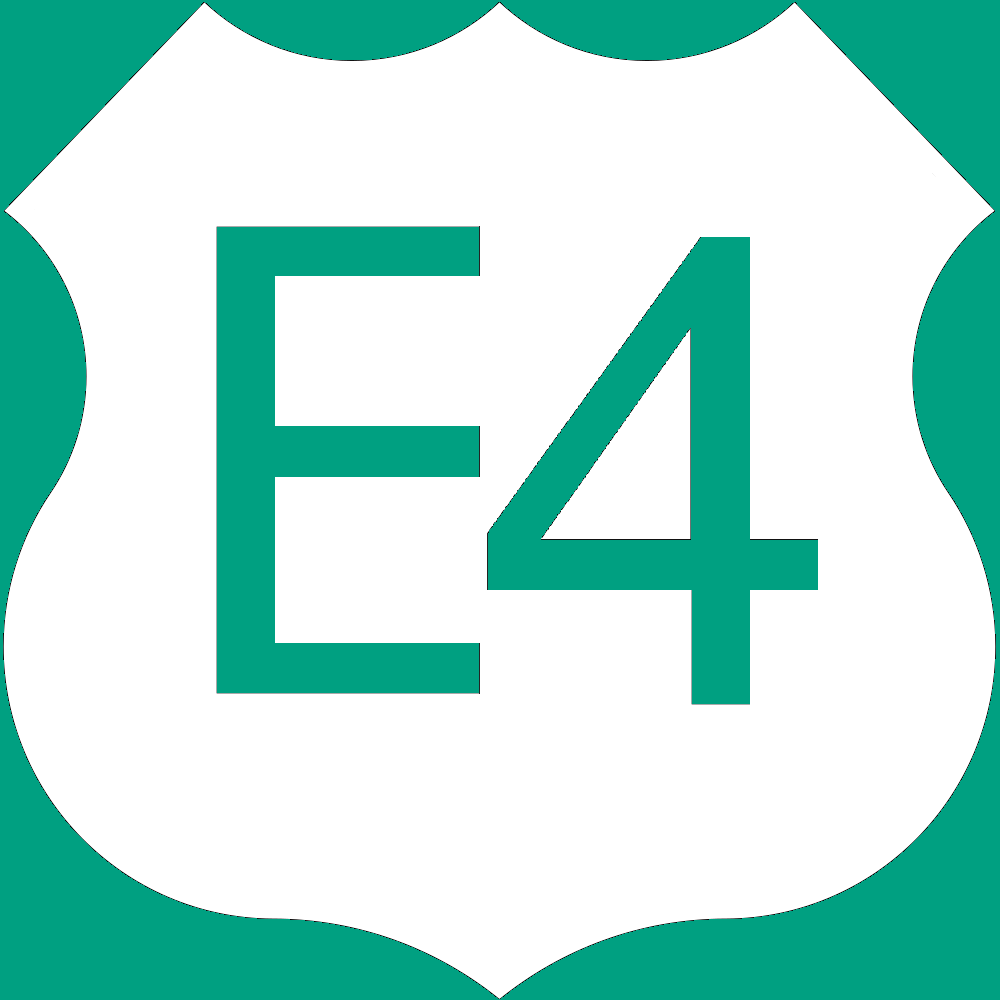
Expressway number

== Information signs ==
Information signs

Parking lot

Pay parking lot

Pedestrian crossing

Hump

Ferry

Clinic

Hospital

Telephone

Official tourist information

Gas station

Gas station and repair

Garage station

Restaurants shop

Refreshments shop

Hotel or motel

Picnic site

Airports

Boats ramp

Camping area

Caravans park or site

Caravans park and camping area

Taxis station

Toilets

Drinking waters

Recycle bin

Abreast travelling permitted for bicycles

Dead end

Dead end on the right

Dead end road on the left

Expressway begins

Expressway ends

Compulsory lanes

3 lanes merge to 2 lanes from the left

3 lanes merge to 2 lanes from the right

Detour for the turning left

Detour for the vehicle having overall height exceeding specified height

Arrow direction exclusive lane

Arrow direction exclusive lane

One-way traffic

Forest fire warning signs

== Additional signs ==
Additional signs

Bicycles

Motorcycles

Motorcycle-drawn carts

Cars

Buses

Trucks

Tractors

Animal drawn carts

Vehicles having overall length weight limit on one axle exceeding the specified weight limit on one axle

Large-size trucks having overall length exceeding the specified length

Vehicles having over all length width exceeding the specified width

Vehicles having over all length height exceeding the specified height

To the right hand side

To the right and left hand side

To the left hand side

Forward

Forward and backward

Backward

Beware of trains

Factory gate

Direction of priority road

Direction of priority road

Distance identification marker

Time identification marker

Vehicles loading inflammable goods

== Signposts ==
Signsposts

Delineator post

Guide post (at dangerous curve)

Chevron marker (to the right)

Chevron marker (to the left)

Object marker (on the right)

Object marker (on the curve)

Object marker (on the left)

Railway crossing post

== Road markings ==
Road markings

Single yellow solid line

Double yellow solid line

Single white broken line

White single solid line

Edge line

Straight arrow

Keep right arrow

Keep right arrow

Keep left arrow

Diagonal hatched markings (two-way road)

Chevron markings (one-way road)

Hump marking

Buses stop marking

== Traffic lights ==
Traffic lights

Red

Red and yellow

Green

Yellow
