= Road signs in Vietnam =

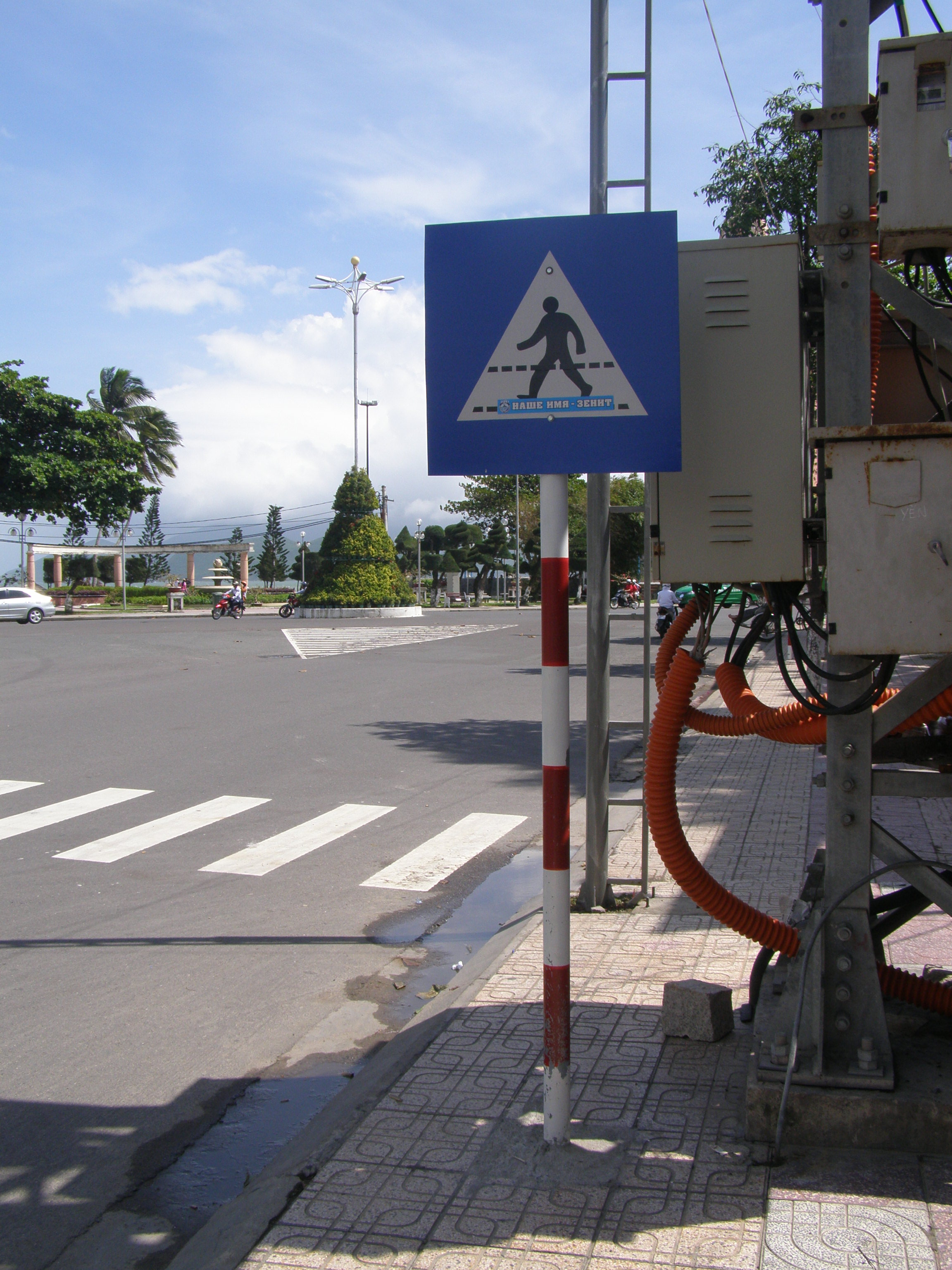
Vietnamese pedestrian crossing sign

Road signs in Vietnam follow Chinese and French road signs. Some signs are written in both Vietnamese and English. The signs are prescribed by the Vietnam Ministry of Transport with the 2019 standardization being the up-to-date regulations.

Vietnam acceded to the Vienna Convention on Road Signs and Signals on August 20, 2014.

== Prohibition signs ==
P.101: All vehicles prohibited

P.102: Wrong way

P.103a: No cars

P.103b: No right turn for cars

P.103c: No left turn for cars

P.104: No motorcycles

P.105: No motorcycles and cars

P.106a: No commercial vehicles

P.106b: No commercial vehicles above designated weight

P.106c: No commercial vehicles carrying dangerous loads

P.107: No buses or trucks

P.107a: No buses

P.107b: No taxis

P.108: No vehicles with trailers

P.108a: No semi-trailers

P.109: No tractors

P.110a: No bicycles

P.110b: No cargo bicycles

P.111a: No mopeds

P.111b: No auto rickshaws

P.111c: No motorcycles with side-cars

P.111d: No pedal tricycles

P.112: No pedestrians

P.113: No handcarts

P.114: No animal-drawn carts

P.115: Gross vehicle weight limit

P.116: Weight limit per axle

P.117: Height limit

P.118: Width limit

P.119: Length limit for commercial vehicles

P.120: Length limit for vehicles with trailers

P.121: Minimum distance between each vehicle

P.123a: No left turn

P.123b: No right turn

P.124a (1): No left U-turns

P.124a (2): No right U-turns

P.124b (1): No left U-turns for cars

P.124b (2): No right U-turns for cars

P.124c: No left turn and U-turn

P.124d: No right turn and U-turn

P.124e: No left turn or U-turn for cars

P.124f: No right turn and U-turn for cars

P.125: No overtaking

P.126: No overtaking for commercial vehicles

P.127: Maximum speed limit

P.127a: Night-time speed limit

P.127b: Speed limits per lane

P.127c: Speed limits and vehicle classes allowed per lane

DP.127a: End of different speed limits and vehicle classes allowed per lane

DP.127b: End of different speed limits per lane

DP.127c: End of different speed limits and vehicle classes allowed per lane

P.128: No honking

P.129: Checkpoint

P.130: No stopping and parking

P.131a: No parking

P.131b: No parking on odd-numbered days

P.131c: No parking on even-numbered days

P.132: Give way to oncoming traffic on narrow roads

DP.133: End of the overtaking prohibition

DP.134: End of the previously signed speed limit

DP.135: End of all previously signed prohibitions

P.136: No straight ahead

P.137: No left and right turn

P.138: No proceeding straight ahead and left turn

P.139: No proceeding straight ahead and right turn

P.140: No agricultural or similar vehicles

== Warning signs ==
W.201a: Bend to left

W.201b: Bend to right

W.201c: Bend to the left with a danger of vehicle rollover

W.201d: Bend to the right with a danger of vehicle rollover

W.202a: Double bend first to left

W.202b: Double bend first to right

W.203a: Road narrows ahead on both sides

W.203b: Road narrows ahead on the left side

W.203c: Road narrows ahead on the right side

W.204: Two-way traffic

W.205a: Crossroad

W.205b: Side road junction on the right

W.205c: Side road junction on the left

W.205d: T-junction

W.205e:Y-junction

W.206: Roundabout ahead

W.207a: Road junction with priority

W.207b: Road junction with priority

W.207c: Road junction with priority

W.207d: Road junction with priority

W.207e: Road junction with priority

W.207f: Road junction with priority

W.207g: Road junction with priority

W.207h: Road junction with priority

W.207i: Road junction with priority

W.207k: Road junction with priority

W.207l: Road junction with priority

W.208: Give way

W.209: Traffic signals ahead

W.210: Railway crossing with gates ahead

W.211: Railway crossing without gates ahead

W.212: Narrow bridge

W.213: Temporary bridge

W.214: Drawbridge

W.215a: Unprotected quayside of riverbank

W.215b: Embankment along the right side of the road

W.215c: Embankment along the left side of the road

W.216a: Ford

W.216b: Ford susceptible to flash flooding

W.217: Ferry

W.218: Underpass

W.219: Steep descent

W.220: Steep ascent

W.221a: Uneven road

W.221b: Road bump

W.222a: Slippery road

W.222b: Dangerous shoulder

W.223a: Dangerous cliff on the left

W.223b: Dangerous cliff on the right

W.224: Pedestrian crossing ahead

W.225: Children area

W.226a: Cycle crossing

W.227: Construction site ahead

W.228a: Risk of landslides from the left

W.228b: Risk of landslides from the right

W.228c: Loose stones

W.228d: Weak road

W.229: Low-flying aircraft

W.230: Farm animals

W.231: Wild animals

W.232: Crosswinds

W.233: Other danger

W.234: Two-way traffic

W.235: Beginning of dual carriageway / median strip

W.236: End of dual carriageway / median strip

W.237: Hump bridge

W.238: Expressway ahead

W.239a: Overhead electrical cables

W.239b: Clearance height

W.240: Tunnel ahead

W.241: Traffic queues

W.242a: Single track railway crossing

W.242b: Multitrack railway crossing

W.243a: Countdown beacon of the distance to a railroad crossing ahead (50m)

W.243b: Countdown beacon of the distance to a railroad crossing ahead (100m)

W.243c: Countdown beacon of the distance to a railroad crossing ahead (150m)

W.244: Accident-prone area

W.245a: Slow down

W.245b: Slow down (with English sign)

W.246a: Median strip ahead - pass on either side

W.246b: Median strip ahead - pass on left side

W.246c: Median strip ahead - pass on right side

W.247: Attention to the parked car

== Mandatory signs ==
R.122: Stop

R.301a: Go straight ahead

R.301b: Turn right only

R.301c: Turn left only

R.301d: Vehicles are only allowed to turn right

R.301e: Vehicles are only allowed to turn left

R.301f: Vehicles are only allowed to go straight and turn right

R.301g: Vehicles are only allowed to go straight and turn left

R.301h: Vehicles are only allowed to turn left and turn right

R.302a: Keep right

R.302b: Keep left

R.302c: Pass on either side

R.303: The intersection runs around the roundabout

R.304: Road for rudimentary vehicles

R.305: Lane for pedestrians

R.306: Minimum speed limit

R.307: End of the minimum speed limit

R.308a: Overpass route

R.308b: Overpass route

R.309: Use horn

R.310a: Vehicles carrying dangerous load can only turn left

R.310b: Vehicles carrying dangerous load can only go straight

R.310c: Vehicles carrying dangerous load can only turn right

R.403a: Road for cars

R.403b: Road for cars and motorcycles

R.403c: Road for buses

R.403d: Road for passenger cars

R.403e: Road for motorcycles

R.403f: Road for motorcycles and bicycles

R.403g: Road for four-wheeled cargo vehicles

R.403h: Road for four-wheeled motorized passenger vehicles

R.403k: Road for four-wheeled motorized cargo and passenger vehicles

R.404a: End of road for cars

R.404b: End of road for cars and motorcycles

R.404c: End of road for buses

R.404d: End of road for passenger cars

R.404e: End of road for motorcycles

R.404f: End of road for motorcycles and bicycles

R.404g: End of road for four-wheeled cargo vehicles

R.404h: End of road for four-wheeled motorized passenger vehicles

R.404k: End of road for four-wheeled motorized cargo and passenger vehicles

R.411: Direction to be followed on each lane

R.412a: Lane for coaches

R.412b: Lane for passenger cars

R.412c: Lane for commercial vehicles

R.412d: Lane for motorcycles

R.412e: Lane for buses

R.412f: Lane for cars

R.412g: Lane for motorcycles and bicycles

R.412h: Lane for bicycles

R.412i: End of lane for coaches

R.412j: End of lane for passenger cars

R.412k: End of lane for commercial vehicles

R.412m: End of lane for buses

R.412n: End of lane for cars

R.412o: End of lane for motorcycles and bicycles

R.412p: End of lane for bicycles

R.415a: Vehicle classes allowed per lane

R.415b: End of vehicle classes allowed per lane

R.420: Start of residential area

R.421: End of residential area

=== RE signs ===
R.E,9a: No parking zone

R.E,9b: Time-restricted no parking zone

R.E,9c: Parking zone

R.E,9d: Maximum speed limit zone

R.E,10a: End of no parking zone

R.E,10b: End of time-restricted no parking zone

R.E,10c: End of parking zone

R.E,10d: End of maximum speed limit zone

R.E,11a: Start of tunnel

R.E,11b: End of tunnel

== Information signs ==
I.401: Main road

I.402: End of the main road

I.405a: Dead end street on the right

I.405b: Dead end street on the left

I.405c: Dead end

I.406: Priority over oncoming traffic

I.407a: One way street

I.407b: One way street

I.407c: One way street

I.408: Parking

I.408a: Parking sign with a diagram of how to position your vehicle

I.409: U-turn permitted

I.410: Turning area

I.413a: One way street with a contraflow lane for buses

I.413b: One way street with a contraflow lane for buses

I.413c: One way street with a contraflow lane for buses

I.414a: Advance direction sign

I.414b: Advance direction sign

I.414c: Advance direction sign

I.414d: Advance direction sign

I.415: Arrows indicate direction

I.416: Bypasses

I.417a: Mandatory direction for specific vehicles

I.417b: Mandatory direction for specific vehicles

I.417c: Mandatory direction for specific vehicles

I.418: Alternative route where a turn is prohibited

I.419a: Boundary sign

I.419b: Boundary sign (with English)

I.422a: Historical site

I.422b: Historical site (with English)

I.423a: Pedestrian crossing

I.423b: Pedestrian crossing

I.423c: Start of pedestrian path

I.424a: Pedestrian overpass on the left

I.424b: Pedestrian overpass on the right

I.424c: Pedestrian underpass on the left

I.424d: Pedestrian underpass on the right

I.425: Hospital

I.426: Medical station

I.427a: Repair shop

I.427b: Weigh station

I.428a: Gas Station

I.428b: EV charging station

I.428c: Gas Station and EV charging station

I.429: Car wash

I.430: Telephone

I.431: Rest area

I.432: Hotel

I.433a: Picnic site

I.433b: Campsite

I.433c: Caravan site

I.433d: Camping and caravan site

I.433e: Youth hostel

I.434a: Bus stop / station

I.434b: Truck stop / station

I.435: Tram stop / station

I.436: Traffic police station

I.437: Expressway

I.439: Bridge information

I.440: Section of road ahead is under construction

I.441a: Distance to a construction site ahead (500m)

I.441b: Distance to a construction site ahead (100m)

I.441c: Distance to a construction site ahead (50m)

I.442: Market

I.443: This sign is placed on vehicles pulling a trailer

I.444a: Direction to railway station

I.444b: Direction to airport

I.444c: Direction to parking lot

I.444d: Direction to bus station

I.444e: Direction to first aid

I.444f: Direction to waterway station

I.444g: Direction to tourist attraction

I.444h: Direction to gasoline station

I.444i: Direction to carwash

I.444j: Direction to ferry

I.444k: Direction to metro station

I.444l: Direction to restaurant

I.444m: Direction to garage

I.445a: Slippery road, slow down

I.445b: Steep road, slow down

I.445c: Foggy road, slow down

I.445d: Weak road surface

I.445e: Large vehicles keep right

I.445f: Beware of crosswinds

I.445g: Accident-prone area

I.445h: Continuous downgrade

I.446: Handicap

I.447a: Interchange overpass

I.447b: Interchange overpass

I.447c: Interchange overpass

I.447d: Interchange overpass

I.448: Escape lane (2 km)

I.448: Escape lane (1 km)

I.448: Escape lane (300 m)

I.448: Escape lane (entrance)

I.449: Asian Highway Shield

=== Information signs on the expressway ===
IE.450a: Indicate the distance to the intersection with the entrance path to the expressway

IE.450b: Diagram directions to the highway access road

IE.451a: Distance indication to expressway entrance

IE.451b: Expressway entrance directions

IE.452: Expressway start point indication

IE.453a: Distance indication to the end of expressway

IE.453b: Expressway end point indication

IE.453c: End of expressway

IE.454: Distance to exit ahead

IE.455: Distance to next exits

IE.456a: Distance to rest area

IE.456b: Direction to rest area

IE.456c: Entrance to rest area

IE.457a: Distance to parking area

IE.457b: Direction to parking area

IE.458: Distance to next rest areas

IE.459a: Distance to tourist area

IE.459b: Direction to tourist area

IE.460a: One-digt kilometer marker

IE.460b: Two-digt kilometer marker

IE.460c: Three-digt kilometer marker

IE.461a: Distance to public service/entertainment area

IE.461b: Direction to public service/entertainment area

IE.461c: Direction to public service area

IE.461d: Direction to entertainment area

IE.462: Radio frequency

Biển IE.463a
Distance to weigh station

Biển IE.463b
Direction to weigh station

Biển IE.463c
Entrance to weigh station

IE.464a: One-way exit

IE.464b: Directions to exit

IE.465: Indication of location and distance

IE.466: Show one-way exit diagrams at all intersections on the road expressway

IE.467a: Distance to merge lane

IE.467b: Direction to merge lane

IE.468a: Obstacle ahead - Pass on the left

IE.468b: Obstacle ahead - Pass on either side

IE.468c: Obstacle ahead - Pass on the right

IE.469a: Chevron alignment sign - Curve to the right

IE.469b: Chevron alignment sign - Curve to the left

IE.470: Emergency telephone number

IE.471: Instructions for keeping a safe driving distance.

IE.472a:Indication of the distance to the toll booth

IE.472b: Indication of the distance to the toll booth

IE.472c: Electronic toll collection

IE.472d: Take card

IE.472e: Pay toll

IE.473: Slow down

IE.474: Exit

== Supplementary signs ==
S.501 : Distance of signaling object

S.502 : Distance to signaling object

S.503a: Direction of validity

S.503b: Direction of validity

S.503c: Direction of validity

S.H,3a: Direction of validity (GMS CBTA)

S.H,3b: Direction of validity (GMS CBTA)

S.H,3c: Direction of validity (GMS CBTA)

S.503d: Direction of validity

S.503e: Direction of validity

S.503f: Direction of validity

S.504: Road lane

S.505a: Vehicle

S.505b: Vehicle weight

S.505c: Axial load

S.506a: Priority direction

S.506b: Priority direction

S.507: Chevrons

S.508a: Time

S.508b: Time

S.509a: Safety height limit

S.509b: No parking

S.510: Slippery road (snow)

S.510b: Caution railway

S.G,7: Camping site ahead (GMS CBTA)

S.G,8: Youth hostel ahead (GMS CBTA)

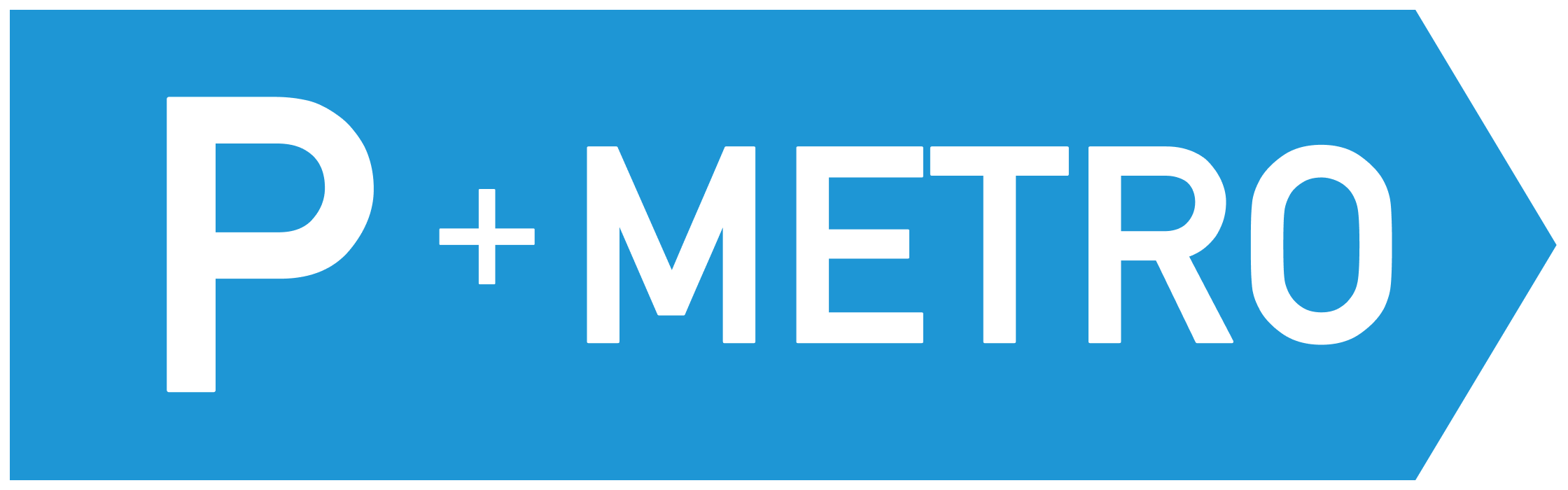
S.G,9b: Parking for public transport users (GMS CBTA)

S.G,11a: Sign indicating number of lanes and direction per lane (GMS CBTA)

S.G,11c: Sign indicating number of lanes and direction per lane (GMS CBTA)

S.G,12a: Sign indicating closure of a traffic lane (GMS CBTA)

S.G,12b: Sign indicating closure of a traffic lane (GMS CBTA)

S.H,6: Expect (GMS CBTA)

== Other signs ==
Asian Highway route shield

Expressway route shield

National road route shield

Provincial road route shield

== Historical ==
=== Old version ===
P.125: No overtaking (2016–2019)

P.126: No overtaking for commercial vehicles (2016–2019)

DP.133: End of the overtaking prohibition (2012–2024)

DP.134: End of the previously signed speed limit (2012–2024)

W.211b: Tramway (removed) (2012–2024)

R.301a: Go straight ahead (2012–2019)

R.301b: Turn right only (2012–2019)

R.301c: Turn left only (2012–2019)

R.301d: Vehicles are only allowed to turn right (2012–2019)

R.301e: Vehicles are only allowed to turn left (2012–2019)

R.301f: Vehicles are only allowed to go straight and turn right (2012–2019)

R.301g: Vehicles are only allowed to go straight and turn left (2012–2019)

R.301h: Vehicles are only allowed to turn left and turn right (2012–2019)

R.302a: Keep right (2012–2019)

R.302b: Keep left (2012–2019)

I.407a: One way street (2012–2019)

I.407b: One way street (2012–2019)

I.407c: One way street (2012–2019)

I.415: Arrows indicate direction (2012–2019)

I.427b: Weigh Station

IE.463a: Distance to weigh station (2016–2024)

IE.463b: Direction to weigh station (2016–2024)

IE.463c: Entrance to weigh station (2016–2024)

IE.471: Instructions for keeping a safe driving distance (2016–2024)

=== Before 1975 ===
Stop (South Vietnam)
