= Road signs in Nepal =

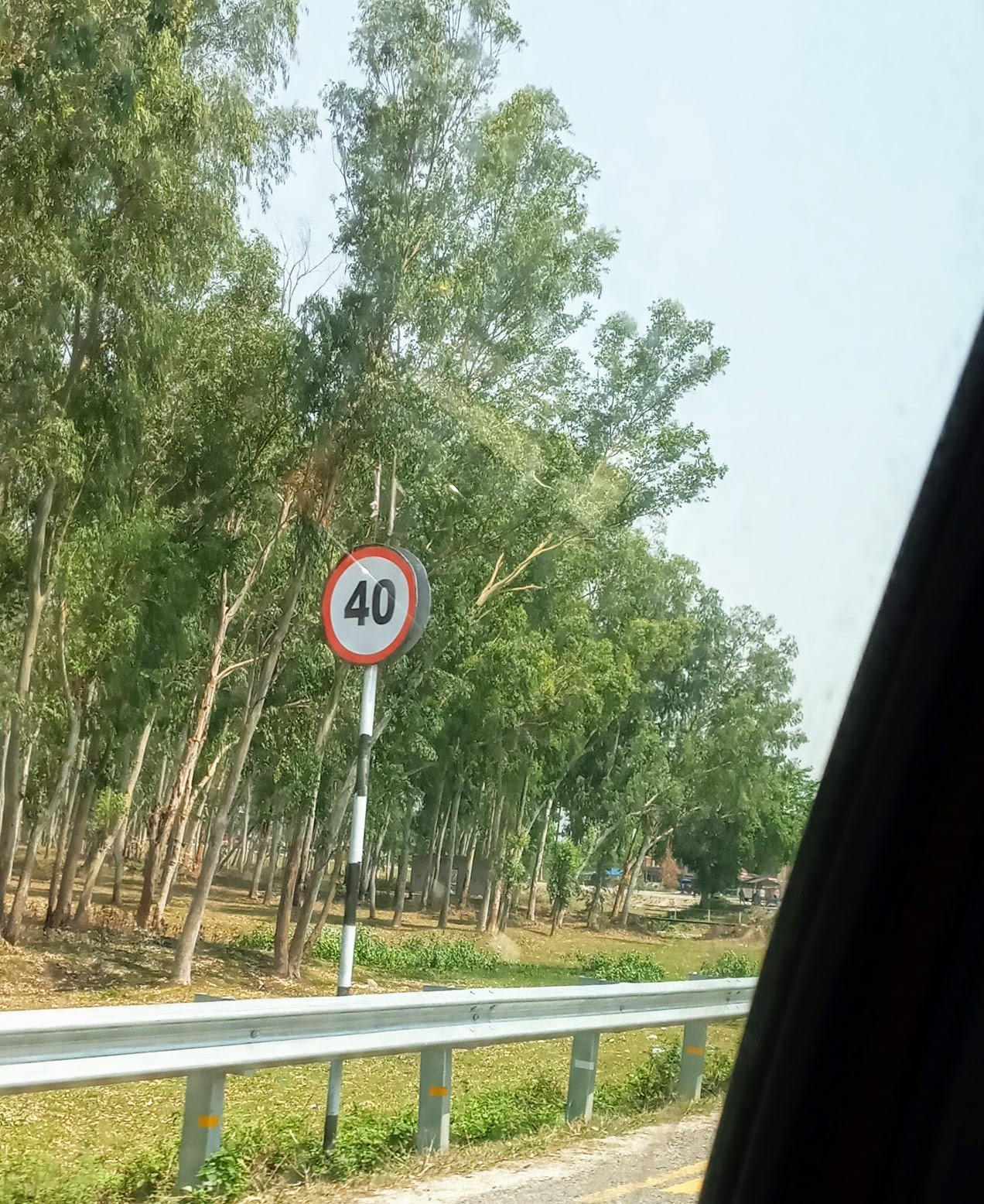
Speed Limit sign at E-W Hwy H01 Jhapa section

Following international norms, road signs in Nepal are controlled by the Department of Roads and are heavily influenced by those used in the United Kingdom.

Nepal drives on the left.

== Regulatory signs ==
A1: Stop and give way

A2: Give way

A3: No entry

A4: No motor vehicles

A5: No trucks

A6: No handcarts

A7: No bullock carts

A8: No pedestrians

A9: No vehicles over length shown

A10: No vehicles over height shown

A11: No vehicles over width shown

A12: No vehicles over maximum gross weight shown

A13: Axle weight limit

A14: No parking

A15: No stopping

A16: No overtaking

A17: No passing without stopping

A18: No right turn

A19: No left turn

A20: No U turns

A21: No use of horn

A22: Maximum speed

A23: End of speed restriction

A24: Temporary stop sign

A25: Temporary go sign

A26: Restriction ends

A27: Go straight ahead only

A28: Turn left

A28: Turn right

A29: Keep left

A29: Keep right

A30: Turn left ahead

A30: Turn right ahead

A31: Mini roundabout

A32: Pass either side

A33: One way traffic

== Warning signs ==
B1: Crossroads with a minor ahead

B2: Crossroad with a major road ahead

B3: Side road on the left ahead

B3: Side road on the right ahead

B4: Staggered junction ahead

B4: Staggered junction ahead

B5: T-junction ahead

B6: Y-junction ahead

B7: Traffic merges from left

B8: Traffic merges onto carriageway

B9: Roundabout ahead

B10: Sharp curve to the left ahead

B10: Sharp curve to the right ahead

B11: Hairpin curve to the left ahead

B11: Hairpin curve to the right ahead

B12: Double curve ahead first to the left

B12: Double curve ahead first to the right

B13: Sharp bend to the left

B13: Sharp bend to the right

B13: Sharp bend to the left

B13: Sharp bend to the right

B14: Road narrows on both sides

B15: Road narrows on left sides

B15: Road narrows on right sides

B16: Dual carriageway ends ahead

B17: Traffic signals ahead

B18: Steep hill downwards

B19: Steep hill upwards

B20: Height limit ahead

B21: Two-way traffic straight ahead

B22: Two-way traffic crosses one way road

B23: Pedestrian crossing ahead

B24: Pedestrians in road ahead

B25: Children ahead

B26: Cattle ahead

B27: Deer ahead

B28: Unprotected quayside or riverbank ahead

B29: Uneven road

B30: Slippery road surface ahead

B31: Road hump

B32: Low-flying aircraft ahead

B33: Falling rocks

B33: Falling rocks

B34: Dangerous dip

B35: Narrow bridge ahead

B36: Other danger ahead

B37: Checkpoint ahead

B38: Roadworks ahead

B39: Loose chippings

B41: Railway level crossing ahead with gate or barrier

B40: Railway level crossing ahead without gate or barrier

B42: Diversion ahead

B43: Dangerous obstruction (Verges)

B43: Dangerous obstruction (verges)

B44: Dangerous obstruction (Central reservation)

B45: T Junction

B46: Sharp bend

B46: Sharp bend

B47: Diversion

B47: Diversion

== Information signs ==
C1: No through road

C2: Pedestrian crossing

C3: Parking place

C4: Overtaking section

C5: Filling station

C6: Breakdown service

C7: Telephone

C8: Hotel or motel

C9: First-aid post

C10: Hospital

C11: Refreshments

C12: Restaurant

C13: Picnic Site

C14: Recommended route for pedestrians and cyclists

C15: Recommended route for pedestrians

C16: Recommended route for cyclists

C17: Bus Stop

C18: Taxi Rank

C19: One way traffic

C19: One way traffic

C20: Beginning of City Limit

C21: End of City Limit

C22: Advance directional for roundabouts (main roads)

C23: Reassurance directional (main roads)

C24: Advance directional (main roads)

C25: Intersection directional (main roads)

C26: Intersection directional (temporary)

C27: Intersection directional

C28: Advance directional

C29: Bridge name

== Additional signs ==
D1: Distance warning

D12: Ice

D17: Cars

D18: Trucks

D19: Buses

D25: End

D26: End of Restriction
