= Road signs in Israel =

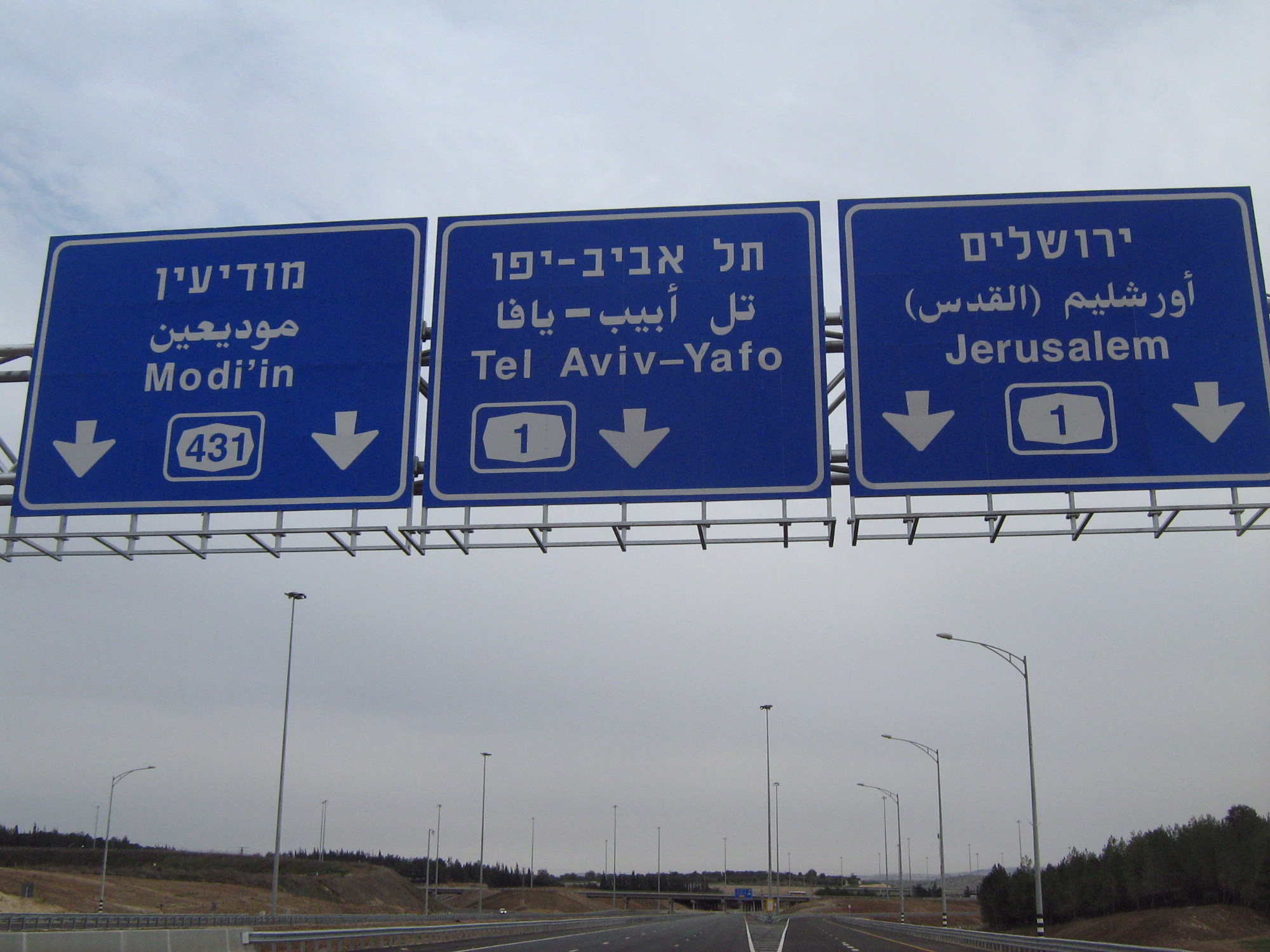
Israeli trilingual road signs

Road signs in Israel are regulated by the Ministry of Transport and Road Safety in the Division of Transportation Planning, most recently set forth in June 2011.

They generally use the same pattern of colors, shapes, and symbols set out in the Vienna Convention on Road Signs and Signals, which are also used in most countries of Europe and the Middle East. Despite this, Israel is not a signatory to this convention.

== Language ==
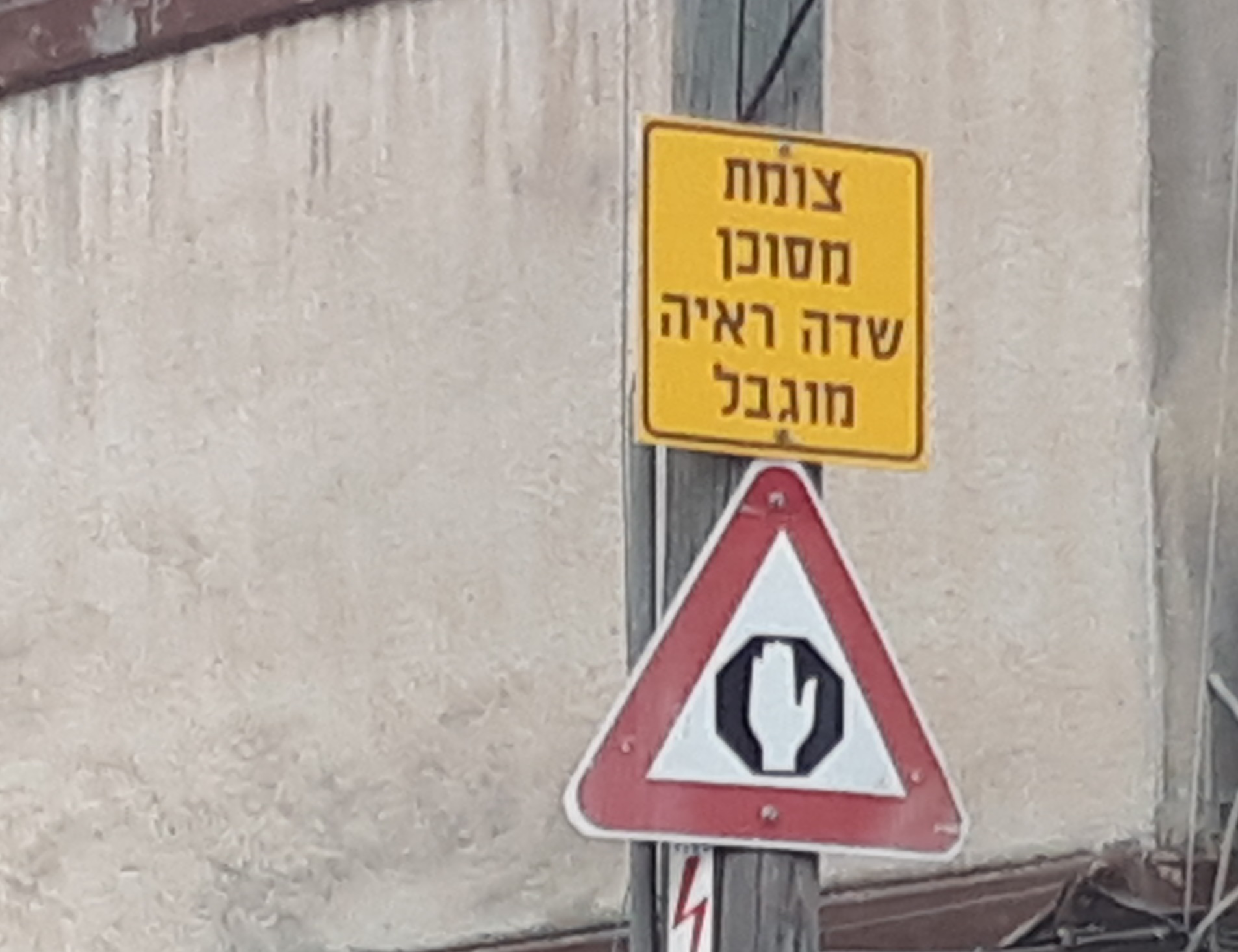
Road signs in Israel

Signs employ three scripts – Hebrew, Arabic, and Latin – and are written in Hebrew, the official language of the country, Arabic, and in English.

The stop sign, however, instead of displaying words in three languages, or even just in English as required by the Vienna Convention on Road Traffic, conveys its meaning through the depiction of a raised hand.

== Font ==
Israeli road sign regulations provide for the following fonts to be used: Tamrurim for Hebrew script, Medina for Arabic script, and Triumvirat (a Helvetica derivative) for Latin script as well as numbers. However, these rules are not consistently followed; some signs use Highway Gothic or Clearview for the Latin script.

== Warning signs ==
Signs warning of hazardous conditions or dangerous situations bear a black-on-white symbol inside a red-bordered triangle.

Signs giving warnings

Uneven road

Sharp right curve

Sharp left curve

Curve right and then left

Curve left and then right

Winding road ahead

Barriers

Barriers

Road narrows ahead

Road narrows from right ahead

Road narrows from left ahead

Barriers

Barriers

Barriers

Intersection

Side road on the right

Side road on the left

T-intersection

Barriers

Staggered crossroads

Staggered crossroads

Roundabout ahead

Traffic signal ahead

Minor road merging from the right

Minor road merging from the left

Merge with major road from the right

Merge with major road from the left

Possible traffic congestion

Traffic congestion ahead

Tram crossing ahead

Railroad crossing ahead

Pedestrian crosswalk

Pedestrians nearby

Cyclists crossing

Tunnel ahead

Stop sign ahead

Dangerous descent

Slippery road

Falling rocks on the right

Falling rocks on the left

Traffic deflecting file

Speed breaker

Two-way traffic ahead

Camels crossing

Farm vehicles

Children

Road works

End of road works

Flooded road

== Regulatory signs ==
With the exception of the special shapes used for "Stop" and "Yield" signs (respectively, an octagon and a downward-pointing triangle), signs giving orders are circular and are of two kinds:

- Mandatory signs (e.g. "Turn right only") bear a white symbol on a blue disk.
- Prohibitory signs (e.g. "No left turn") take the form of a black-on-white symbol inside a red-bordered circle, sometimes with the addition of a red slash through the symbol.
Mandatory signs

Go straight or turn right

Go straight or turn left

Go straight

Turn right

Turn left

Turn right or left

Go straight or make right U-turn

Go straight or make left U-turn

Compulsory right U-turn

Compulsory left U-turn

May pass on either side

Pass on the right

Pass on the left

Start of motorway

End of motorway

Minimum speed limit

Road for motor vehicles only

Start of traffic calming area

End of traffic calming area

Traffic recession area

End of traffic recession area

Cycle lane

End of cycle lane

Pedestrian path

Cycle path

Shared pedestrian and cycle path

Segregated pedestrian and cycle path

Toll lane or toll road

End of toll lane or toll road
Signs giving orders

Give way

Stop

Roundabout

Stop (manual control)

Go (manual control)

Give way to oncoming vehicles

Priority over oncoming vehicles

Priority road

End of priority road

Closed to all vehicles

No entry

Barriers

Barriers

Cars and motorbikes prohibited

No trucks weighing over 10 tonnes

Vehicles transporting hazardous materials prohibited

Cars prohibited

Motorbikes prohibited

Tractors and work vehicles prohibited

Animals prohibited

Bicycles prohibited

Pedestrians prohibited

Pedestrians, bicycles, work transport and animals prohibited

No vehicles weighing over 6 tonnes

No vehicles higher than 4.6 meters

No vehicles wider than 2.1 meters

No driving lessons zone

End of no driving lessons zone

No overtaking

End of no overtaking

Overtaking is prohibited for large vehicles

End of no overtaking for large vehicles

Urban area

End of urban area

Speed limit (50 km/h)

Speed limit (50 km/h)

End of speed limit (50 km/h)

No audible noise

No right turn

No left turn

No right U-turn

No left U-turn

Parking prohibited

Parking and stopping prohibited

End of parking prohibition

Parking of trucks weighing over 10,000 kg prohibited

End of parking prohibition of trucks weighing over 10,000 kg

Customs

Entry prohibited to vehicles measuring over ... meters in length

Low emission zone

End of low emission zone

== Information signs ==
Signs giving information are generally rectangular (sometimes pointed at one end in the case of direction signage).

Highways in Israel are classified as:

- National (single-digit number)
- Inter-city (two digits)
- Regional (three digits)
- Local (four digits)

Route-marker signs are also color-coded:

- Freeways (Blue)
- Expressways (Red)
- Regional routes (Green)
- Local roads (Black, formerly Brown)

Most directional signs to towns and cities are:

- white-on-blue (freeways)
- white-on-green (other main roads)
- black-on-white (local destinations)
- white-on-brown (tourist destinations: landmarks, historical sites, nature reserves, etc.).

The sign for permitted parking features a white-on-blue "P" for "parking" enclosed by the Hebrew letter Het ("ח") for "hanaya" (Hebrew: חניה), which also means "parking").

The sign informing users that they are on a priority road is a white-edged yellow "diamond" (i.e. a square turned through 45°).

Information signs

National Freeway (1 digit)

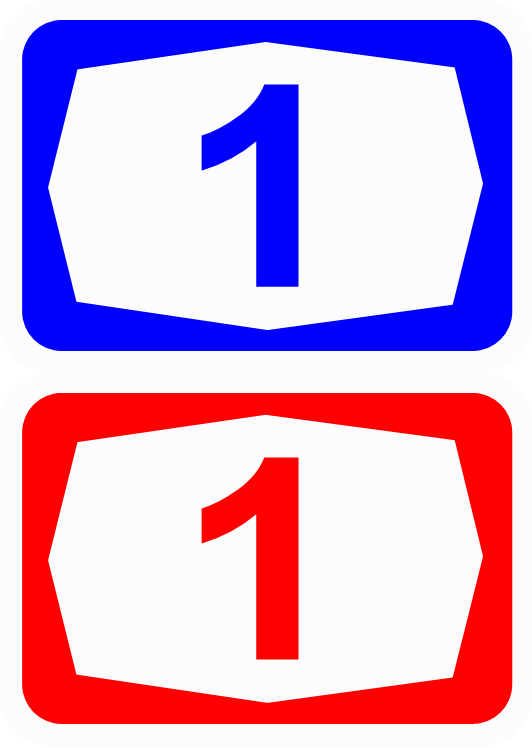
National Freeway which is also an Inter-City Expressway (1 digit)

National Inter-City Expressway (1 digit)

Inter-City Expressway (2 digits)

National Expressway (2 digit)

Regional roads (3 digits)

Local roads (4 digits)

Freeway sign

Major road sign

Local destination sign

Tourist destination sign

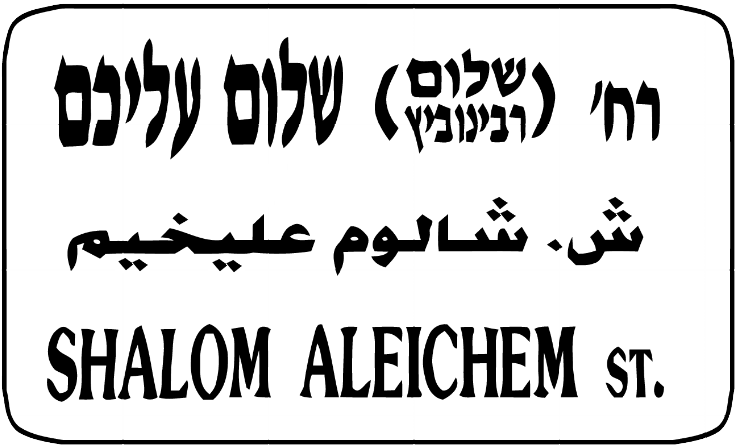
Street sign

Entry to toll

Parking (sign can be two-sided)

Handicapped parking

Pedestrian crossing

Exit sign

One-way traffic

Border sign

No through road

No through road on right

No through road on left

Tunnel

End of tunnel
