= Road signs in Iran =

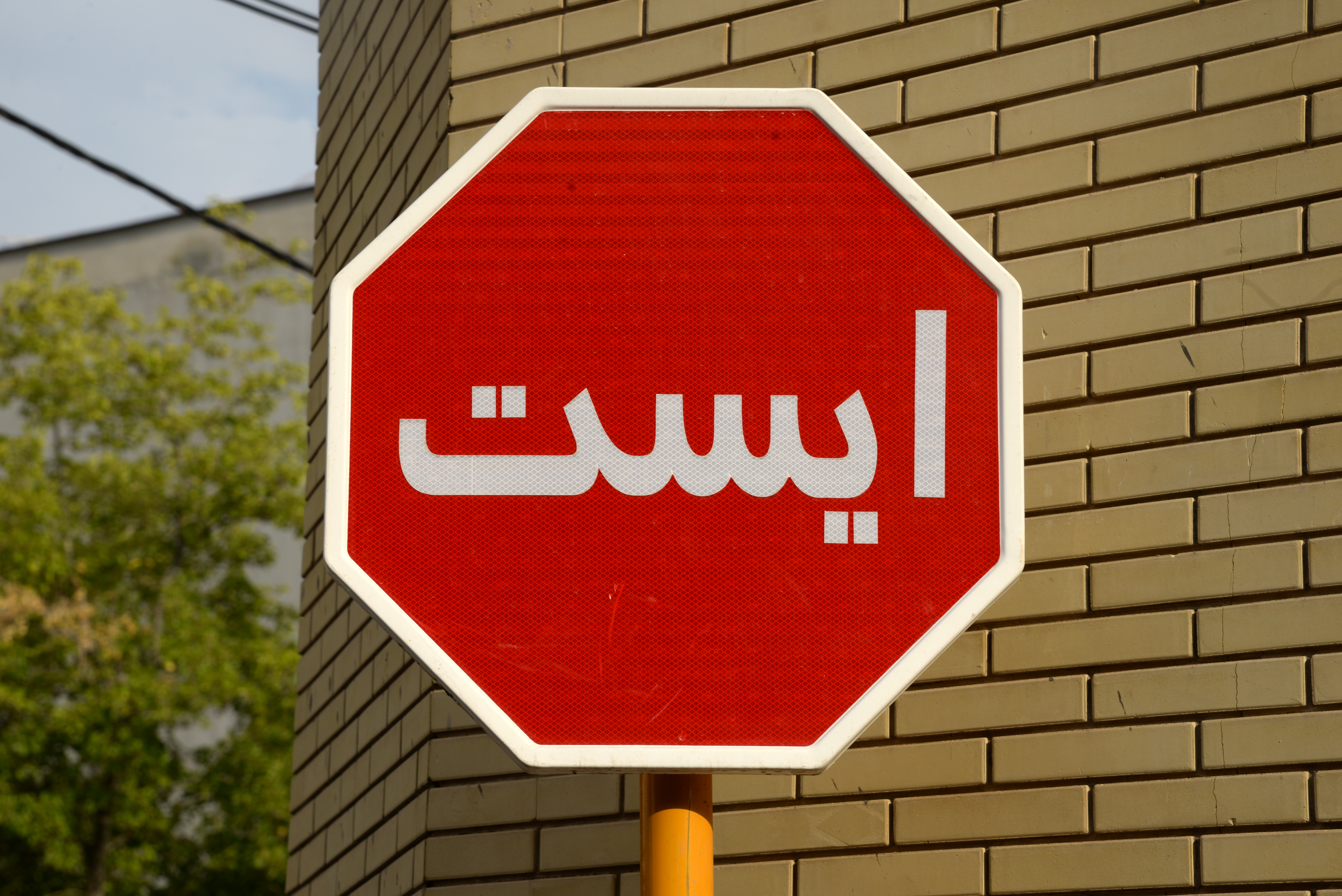
Stop sign (written in Persian) located in Shiraz.

Road signs in Iran are regulated by both INSO standard 14815-1 and 14815-2. They generally follow the Vienna Convention on Road Signs and Signals and their designs both influenced by British and German road signage designs.

Road signs are divided in three categories:

- Regulatory signs;
- Warning signs;
- Information signs.

== History ==
Iran signed the Vienna Convention on Road Signs and Signals on November 8th, 1968 and ratified it on the date of May 21, 1976.

Pictogram inspired signs were a common sight in urban Iran even before the Pahlavi dynasty signed the Vienna Convention, often on a blank background; paired with Nastaliq text, and a bespoke Pictogram design.

By the late 70s, Iran's road furniture looked similar to the likes of Europe.

== Warning signs ==
Warning for bends

Bend to the right

Bend to the left

Double bend, first to the right

Double bend, first to the left

Junction

Crossroad with priority

Side road with priority from the right

Side road with priority from the left

Roundabout

Dangerous descent (10%)

Dangerous climb (10%)

Road narrows (both sides)

Road narrows (left side)

Uneven road

Caution, speed bump

Danger of skidding

Two-way traffic

Traffic light

Animals (domesticated)

Wild animals

Crosswind

Loose gravel

Rockfall

Pedestrian crossing

Pedestrians

Children

School

Caution for bicyclists

Aircraft (landing corridor above road)

Caution, tunnel

Other hazard

Caution, queues likely

Be careful in winter

Tramway

Caution, fog likely

Caution, accident black spot

Soft verge

Level crossing with gates or barriers

Level crossing without gates or barriers

Distance marker (150 m)

Distance marker (100 m)

Distance marker (50 m)

Warning, single-track railway crossing

Warning, multiple-track railway crossing

== Priority signs ==
Stop

Give way/yield

Priority road

End of priority road

Priority before the oncoming traffic

Priority of the oncoming traffic

== Prohibitive or restrictive signs ==
Road closed to all vehicles in both directions

No entry

No right turn

No left turn

No U-turn

No cars

No trucks

No buses

No tractors

No motorcycles

No cycling

No animal-drawn vehicles

No handcarts

No motor vehicles

No entry for motorised or animal-drawn vehicles

No vehicles heavier than indicated

No vehicles with axle weight greater than indicated

No vehicles wider than indicated

No vehicles taller than indicated

No vehicles or combinations longer than indicated

No vehicles carrying hazardous cargo

No vehicles carrying water-polluting cargo

Speed limit (80 km/h)

End of speed limit

No overtaking

End of no-overtaking zone

No overtaking by trucks

End of no-overtaking zone for trucks

No use of audible warning signals

End of all prohibitions

Stop to pay toll duty

No stopping

No parking

No pedestrians

No animal riders

No vehicles towing trailers

Safe distance (70 m)

== Mandatory signs ==
Ahead only

Turn right ahead

Turn left ahead

Turn right here

Turn left here

Keep right

Keep left

Pass either side

Ahead or right only

Ahead or left only

Turn left or right

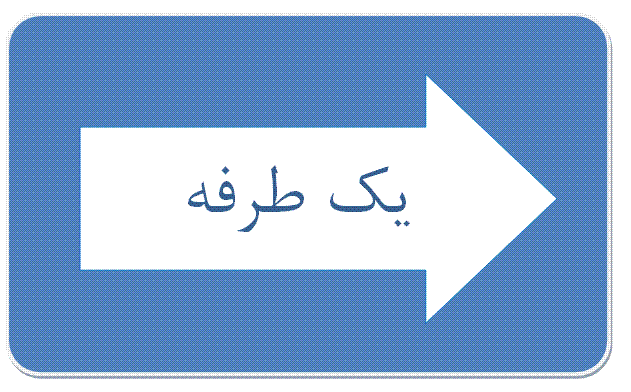
One way

Roundabout

Snow chains compulsory

Minimum speed limit

End of minimum speed limit

Pedestrian zone

Cycleway

Route for animal riders (bridleway)

Keep left (bollard)

Keep right (bollard)

== Traffic regulation ==
Freeway marker

Expressway marker

Road marker

Street marker

Avenue and boulevard marker

Roundabout marker

Sign ahead plaque (200 m, on top of the all signs)

Sign ahead plaque (2 km, on top of the all signs)

Different speed limitations in several roads

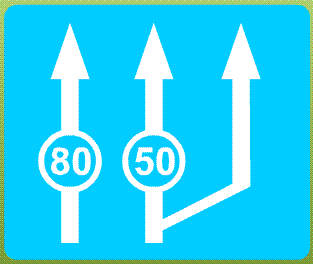
Minimum speed in different lanes

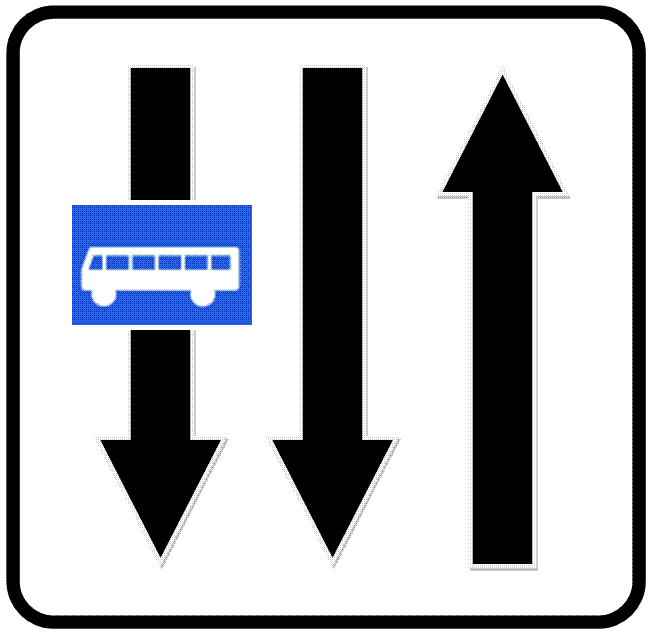
Bus lane ahead

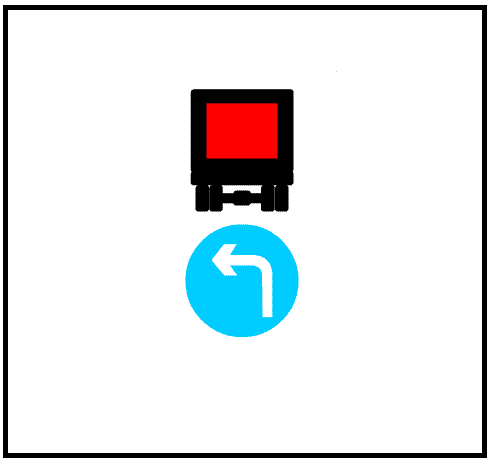
Vehicles carrying hazardous cargo turn left

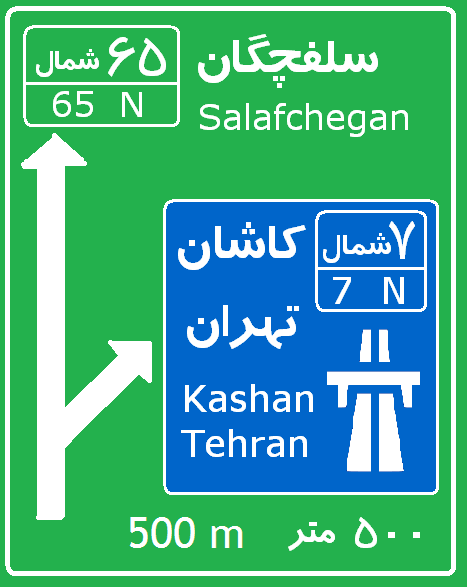
Directional sign

Pedestrian crossing

== Temporary signs ==
Road narrows (both sides)

Uneven road

Danger of skidding

Two-way traffic

Traffic light

Roadworks

Loose gravel

Soft verge

Other dangers

== Route shields ==
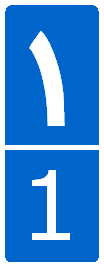
Freeway

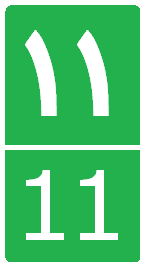
Highway
