= Hiragino =

Series of Japanese typeface

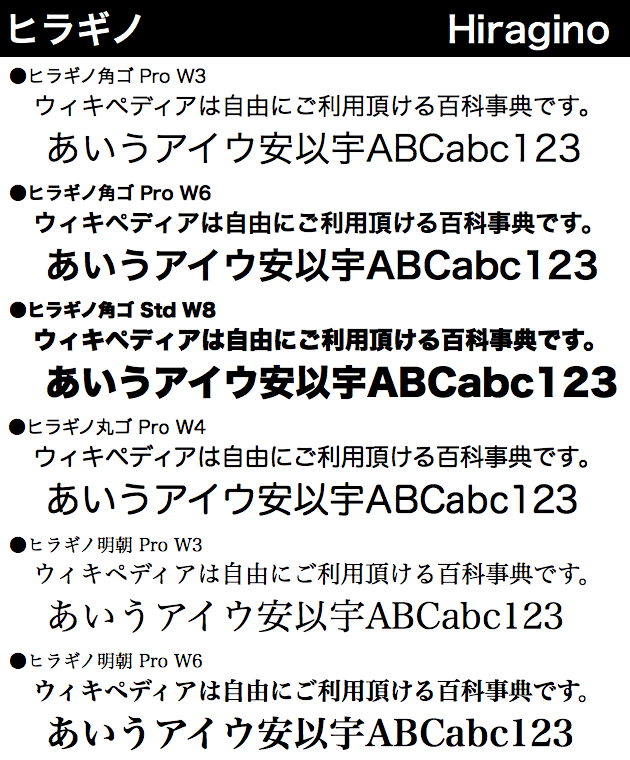
- Designer: Jiyukobo Ltd.
- Date released: 1993
- Also known as: ヒラギノ
- Website: www.screen-hiragino.com

Hiragino (Japanese: ヒラギノ) is a typeface family designed by Jiyukobo Ltd. sold by Screen Graphics Solutions Co., Ltd. (part of Screen Holdings, formally Dainippon Screen Mfg.) to professionals since 1993. It is one of the built-in fonts in most Apple operating systems like macOS and iOS. This series includes not only Japanese Mincho (serif), Kaku Gothic (sans-serif), Maru Gothic (round sans-serif), semi-cursive script and kana typefaces, but also a sans-serif typeface for Simplified Chinese.

The typeface family is named after the Hiragino (柊野) area in Kita-ku, Kyoto, Japan.

== Jiyukobo ==
Jiyukobo Ltd. is a corporation founded by type designers Tsutomu Suzuki, Osamu Torinoumi, and Keiichi Katada, who formerly worked for the phototypesetting corporation Shaken (写研), in Tokyo in 1989. Suzuki served as the president, but after his death in 1998, Torinoumi took his place.
