= Panno (typeface) =

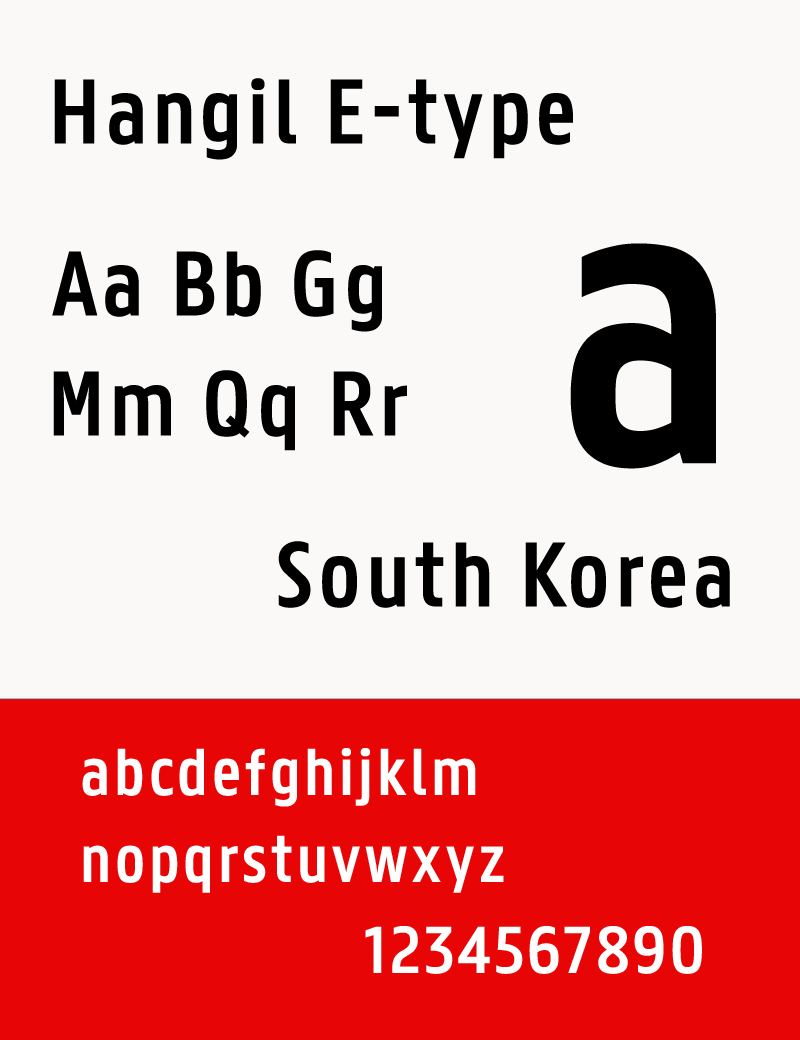
- Category: Sans-serif
- Designer(s): Pieter van Rosmalen
- Commissioned by: Government of South Korea
- Foundry: CakeType, Bold Monday

Panno is a Latin sans-serif typeface designed by Dutch typeface designer Pieter van Rosmalen. It is a typeface specially designed for South Korean traffic signs for Latin text.

== Variants ==
=== Panno Sign ===
Panno Sign is the first variant to be commercially released. Normal and rounded forms are available, and each form has two weights - Negative and Positive - to use against dark and bright backgrounds respectively.

=== Panno Text ===
Panno Text is another commercial variant. It has six weights, and each weight has an italic form.

== Non-Latin letters ==
Currently, Panno has no glyph other than Latin letters and Hindu–Arabic numbers.

Hangil, a Hangul typeface designed for South Korean traffic signs, employs Panno for the Latin and numeral portion.

== In use ==
Panno is one of the results of the South Korean traffic sign reform, along with Hangil. The typeface, called Hangil E-type (E as in English) within the package, also has a condensed form. It replaced a Latin grotesque typeface accompanied to Sandoll Gothic.

Cleveland Magazine uses Panno Text for their design.

Panno Text is the official font of Ghent University.
