= Bo Berndal =

Swedish compositor and typographer

Bo Yngve Berndal (1924 in Stockholm, Sweden – 2013 in Stockholm, Sweden) was a Swedish compositor, type designer, book designer, and educator. In 1991, he was the first to receive the Berling prize in design, instituted by Karl-Erik Forsberg. Berndal was also co-owner of BIGG (a Swedish advertising agency) and Hålet (a gallery dedicated to the typographic arts).

== Career ==
Berndal began working as a typesetter in 1939. He studied calligraphy under Akke Kumlien. Starting in 1949, he was employed at Nordisk Rotogravyr, a Swedish press primarily devoted to printing high-quality illustrations using rotogravure. As a compositor there, he designed books including Naturen som formgivare, Byn med det blå huset and Kust. He illustrated Familje med de fem barnen for the Swedish publisher Norstedts. As it was common practice in midcentury Sweden to furnish books with purely calligraphic covers, Berndal hand-lettered various of these.

For a time Berndal was also a linotype operator. In the early 1950s, he began drawing original typefaces at TYMA, a matrix factory. Type design would afterward become central to his career.

He taught at Skolan för bokhantverk (Stockholm school for book design and printing), Grafiska Institutet (Swedish national college for marketing and advertising), and Konstfackskolan. The agency BIGG resulted from a collaboration with three of his former students. The initials in BIGG stand for Berndal, Ingemarsson, Günther, and Günther.

By the start of the 1990s, Berndal had already adopted the Macintosh as his tool of choice for type design. After his retirement Berndal went on designing type as a hobby. In total he produced over 300 typefaces. Notable among these are Boberia, Grafilone, Euclides, Exlibris, Esseltub (for wayfinding in Stockholm's subway system), and Sispos/Sisneg (for general use in standard signage, later digitized as Bosis). Many of his fonts are nods to Swedish history, including Olaus Magnus, Johabu, Läckö, and Vadstenakursiv.

He made logotypes for numerous businesses over the years, including Riksarkivet (Sweden's National Archives) and the National Museum of Fine Arts in Stockholm.

Berndal was also an author. He co-wrote Typiskt typografiskt (1991) together with author/journalist Paul Frigyes. It provides a general introduction to typography with some emphasis on its role in Sweden. He also wrote a book about Charles Kastenbein's mechanical typesetter, which preceded the Linotype machine, and another book about Peter Schoeffer the Younger.
