= Road signs in Norway =

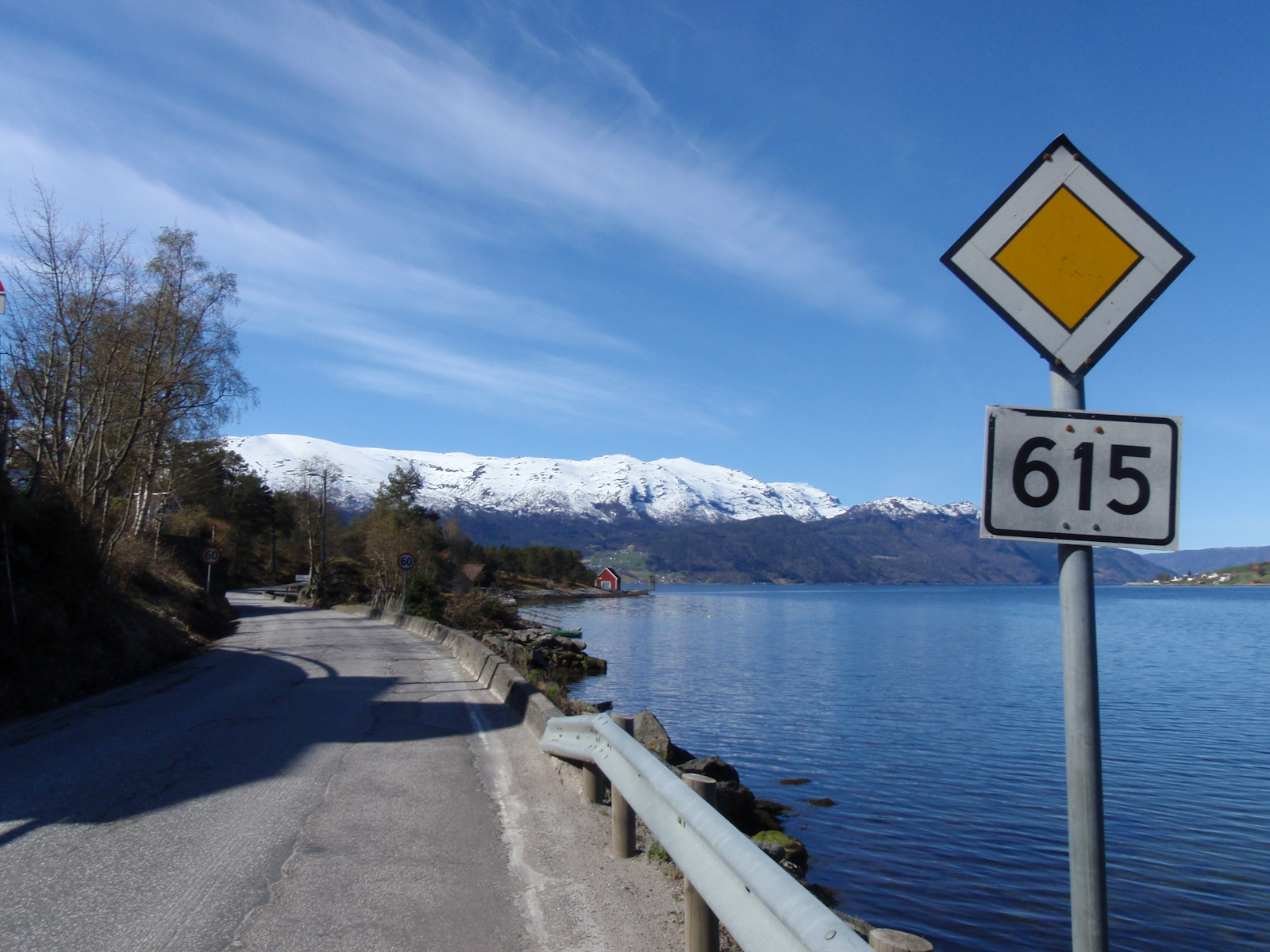
Road signs in Sandane

Road signs in Norway are regulated by the Norwegian Public Roads Administration in conformity with the 1968 Vienna Convention on Road Signs and Signals, to which Norway is a signatory.

Signs follow the general European conventions concerning the use of shape and colour to indicate function. Any text included on supplementary signs will normally be in Norwegian, but may in some cases be bi- or trilingual. In Northern parts of Norway, municipal and informative signs may be printed in both Norwegian and Sami. Close to the Finnish border and in municipalities with significant Norwegian Finnish population signs and village names are also shown in Finnish. In areas close to the Russian border, signs may be written in both the Latin and Cyrillic scripts.

No more than three signs (road number indications excepted) may be mounted on any one pole, with the most important sign appearing at the top. As is customary in European countries, all signs are partly or fully reflectorized or are provided with their own night-time illumination.

The current set of designs were introduced through a reform that went into effect on 1 June 2006, replacing the old sets from 1967 and 1980. As the law outlining this reform was published on 7 October 2005, some signs were already replaced before the law went into effect. The most notable change was the removal of hats and hair on the stickmen making them gender-neutral, but many signs were redesigned or introduced for the first time. In 2022, the meanings of a number of signs were modified to include or exclude users of electric scooters from the regulations they impose.

Norway signed the Vienna Convention on Road Signs and Signals on December 23, 1969 and ratified it on April 1, 1985.

== Warning signs ==
Warning signs are mostly triangular in shape with black symbols on a white background with a red border. Warning signs that are used only temporarily have a yellow background. On Svalbard, a unique warning sign with a black background and white symbol is used for polar bears.

Curve to right

Curve to left

Double curve, first to right

Double curve, first to left

Steep hill

Steep hill

Road narrows on both sides.

Road narrows on right side.

Road narrows on left side.

Uneven road

Speed bump

Roadworks

Loose chippings

Falling rocks

Falling rocks

Slippery road

Dangerous verges

Movable bridge

Quayside, beach, or riverbank

Tunnel ahead

Crossroads (Note: Warns about dangerous crossroads which have normal rules for traffic priority).

Roundabout ahead

Traffic signals

Level crossing with a barrier or gate

Level crossing without a barrier or gate

Distance to level crossing (closest to the crossing)

Distance to level crossing (between other countdown markers)

Distance to level crossing (furthest from the crossing)

Single-track railway

Multi-track railway

Tramway

Pedestrian crossing ahead

Children

Cyclists

Animals (moose)

Animals (reindeer)

Animals (deer)

Animals (cattle)

Animals (sheep)

Animals (polar bear)

Two-way traffic

Traffic queues

Low-flying aircraft

Military activity

Crosswind

Traffic accident

Skiers

Riders

Other dangers

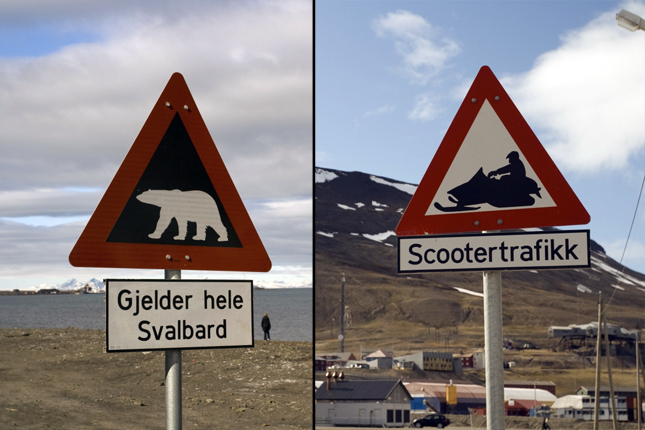
(1) Polar bears
(2) Snowmobiles

== Priority signs ==
Yield (give way)

Stop

Priority road

End of priority road

Priority crossroads (Note: Warns about dangerous crossroads where the road this sign is placed on has priority. Crossing roads have give way or stop signs.)

Give way for oncoming traffic

Priority over oncoming traffic

== Prohibitory signs ==
No entry

Road closed to all traffic

No motor vehicles except small electric vehicles

No tractors, or motor vehicles slower than 40 km/h

No motorcycles or mopeds

No lorries and tractor units

No cyclists and riders of small electric vehicle

No pedestrians

No pedestrians, cyclists, and riders of small electric vehicle

No riders

No small electric vehicles

No transport of dangerous goods

Total weight limit (Note: Restriction is for motor vehicles with more than two wheels and a gross vehicle weight rating above the given weight limit.)

Width limit

Height limit

Length limit

Weight limit for vehicles

Weight limit for lorries

Axle weight limit (Note: No vehicle with weight above the given limit for each axle, and maximum 150% of the limit for each bogie.)

Bogie weight limit

Stop for control

Stop for tax

Stop for customs

No right turn

No left turn

No U-turn

No overtaking

No overtaking for lorries

End of no overtaking

End of no overtaking for lorries

Speed limit

End of special speed limit (Note: Indicates a general speed limit of 50 km/h in populated areas and 80 km/h in rural areas by law.)

Speed limit zone

Speed limit zone for small electric vehicles

End of speed limit zone

End of speed limit zone for small electric vehicles

No stopping

No parking

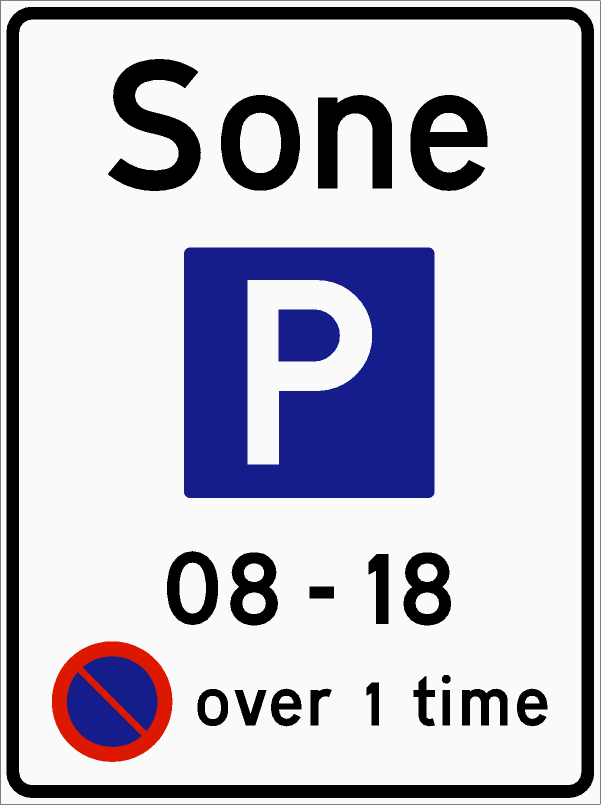
Parking zone

No parking zone

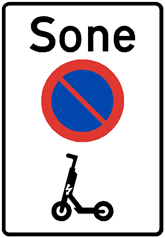
No parking zone for small electric vehicles

End of parking zone

End of no parking zone

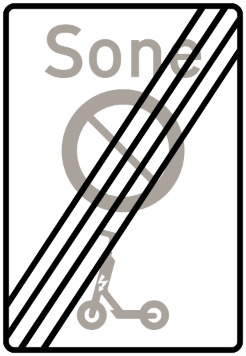
End of no parking zone for small electric vehicles

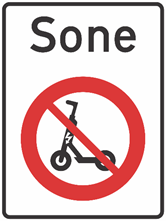
No small electric vehicle zone

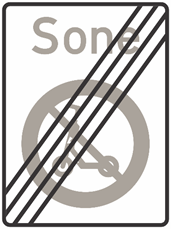
End of no small electric vehicle zone

== Mandatory signs ==
Proceed right

Proceed left

Proceed straight

Turn right

Turn left

Drive straight or turn right

Drive straight or turn left

Turn right or left

Pass on right

Pass on left

Roundabout

Mandatory direction in roundabout

== Informative signs ==
Start of freeway

Start of motor traffic road

End of freeway

End of motor traffic road

Heavy traffic lane (Note: Only vehicles with gross vehicle weight rating higher than indicated can use this lane.)

End of heavy traffic lane

Bus lane (Note: Electric and hydrogen vehicles, motorcycles, mopeds, bicycles, small electric vehicles, and marked emergency vehicles can also use this lane, unless otherwise stated by a supplementary sign.)

Bus and taxi lane

Car-pool lane (Note: Only vehicles with more than indicated occupants including driver can use this lane. Buses and taxis, regardless of how many occupants, can also use this lane.) (Note: Electric and hydrogen vehicles, motorcycles, mopeds, bicycles, small electric vehicles, and marked emergency vehicles, regardless of how many occupants, can also use this lane, unless otherwise stated by a supplementary sign.)

End of bus lane

End of bus and taxi lane

End of car-pool lane

Bus stop

Tram stop

Taxi stop

Pedestrian crossing

Pedestrian crossing

Pedestrian way

Cycle track

Cycle lane (edge)

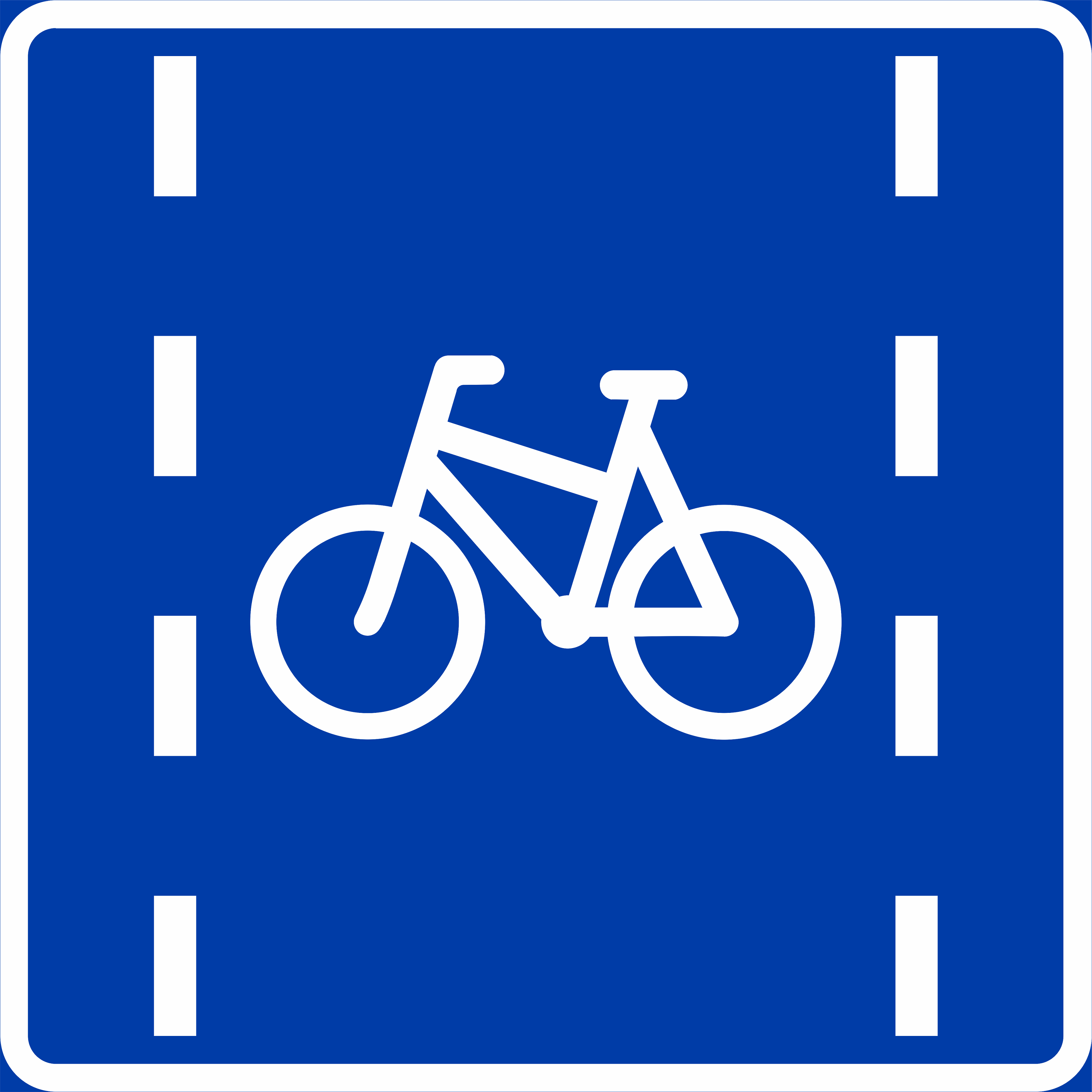
Cycle lane (centered)

Shared-use footway

Passing place (møteplass) (Note: Used frequently on long stretches of single-track roads.)

One-way

One-way

Dead end

Dead end

Dead end (Note: Road closed for motor vehicles.)

Dead end (Note: Side-road closed for motor vehicles.)

Free choice of lane

Merging lanes

Merging roads with speed regulation lane

Merging roads with speed regulation lane

End of lane

New lane starts

Added lane with oncoming traffic

Lane division (Note: Denotes the number of lanes and direction of travel.)

Changed driving pattern

Living street

End of living street

Pedestrian zone (Note: Motor vehicles are normally prohibited in pedestrian zone, except small electric vehicles. If exemption is granted by a supplementary sign, the speed limit is "walking speed.")

End of pedestrian zone

Parking

Emergency layby

Speed camera

Average speed camera

Video surveillance

Information board (Note: Used to provide miscellaneous information. May have a brown background (tourist sign), yellow background (temporary sign) or orange background (detour sign). Example: toll plaza in 150 metres.)

General speed limits

Pedestrians and cyclist prohibited

Speed measuring

Turn and exit

Wrong way

Emergency exit

Direction and distance to emergency exit

== Service signs ==
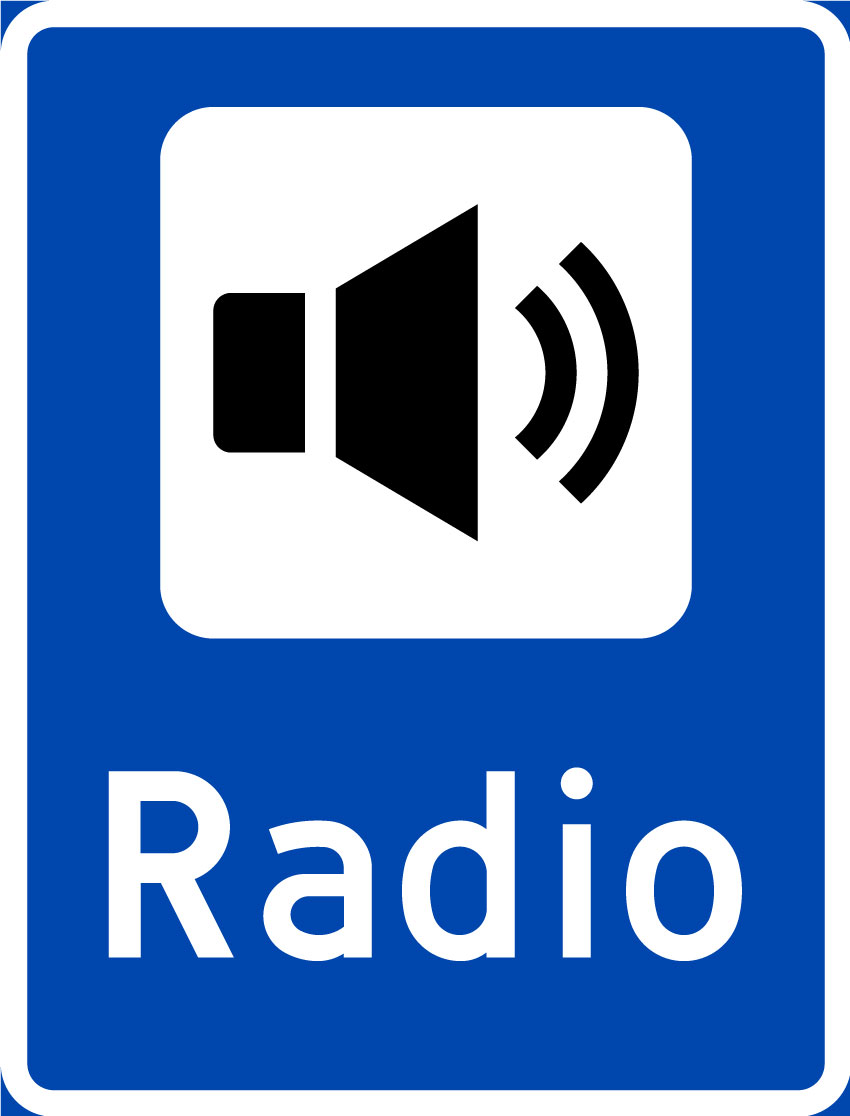
Radio channel

First aid

Emergency phone

Fire extinguisher

Automobile repair shop

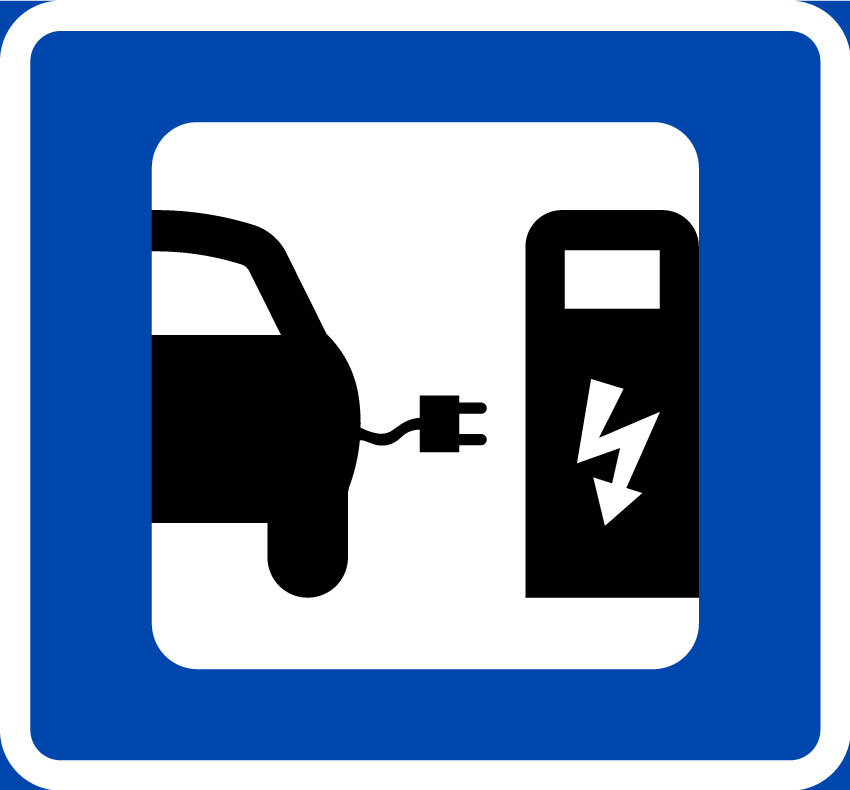
Electric vehicle fast charging station

Gasoline

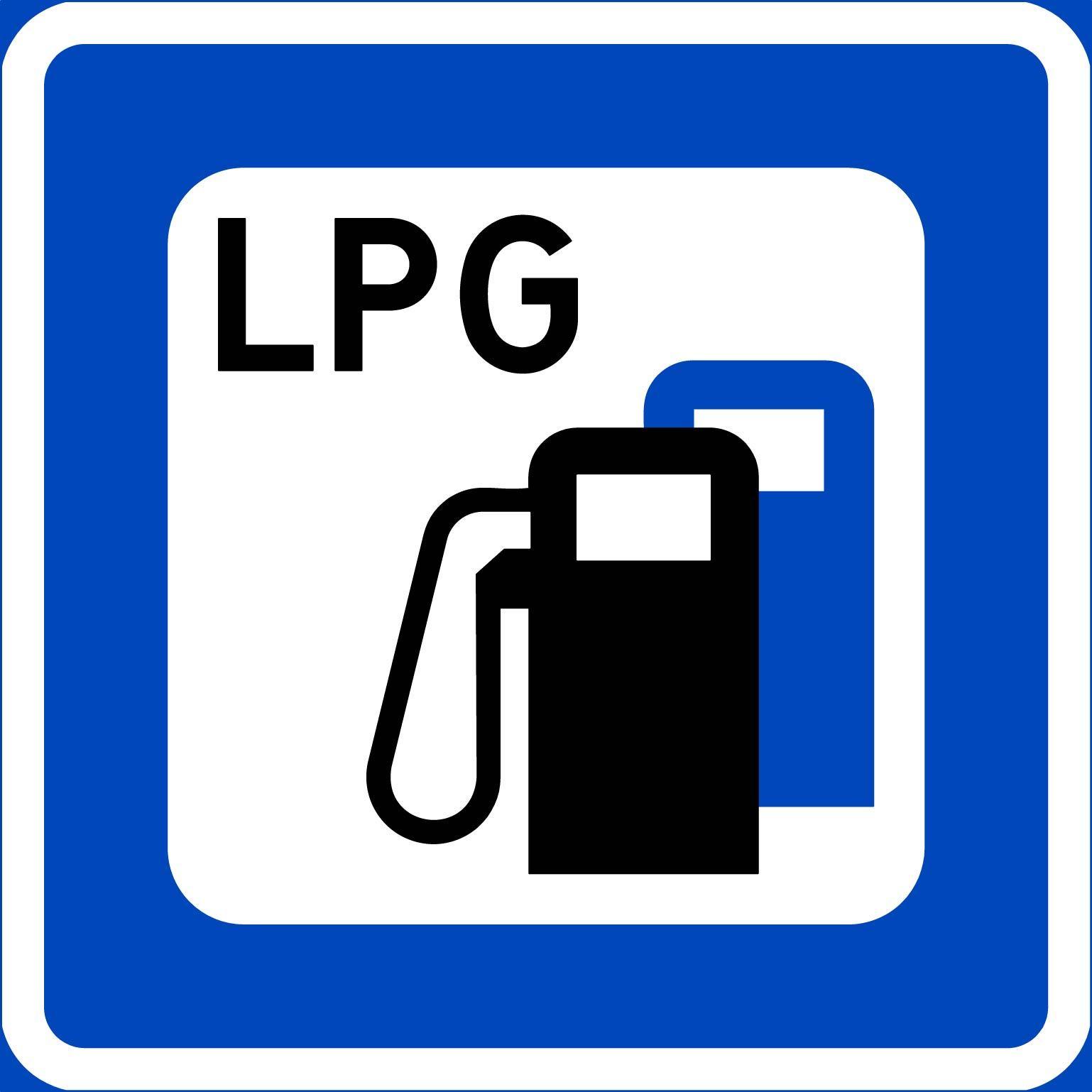
Fuel (Note: Text may vary depending on fuel type available.)

Toilet emptying facility

Toilet

Rest stop

Rest stop with toilet

Light refreshment

Restaurant

Camp site

Caravan park

Camping park

Hostel

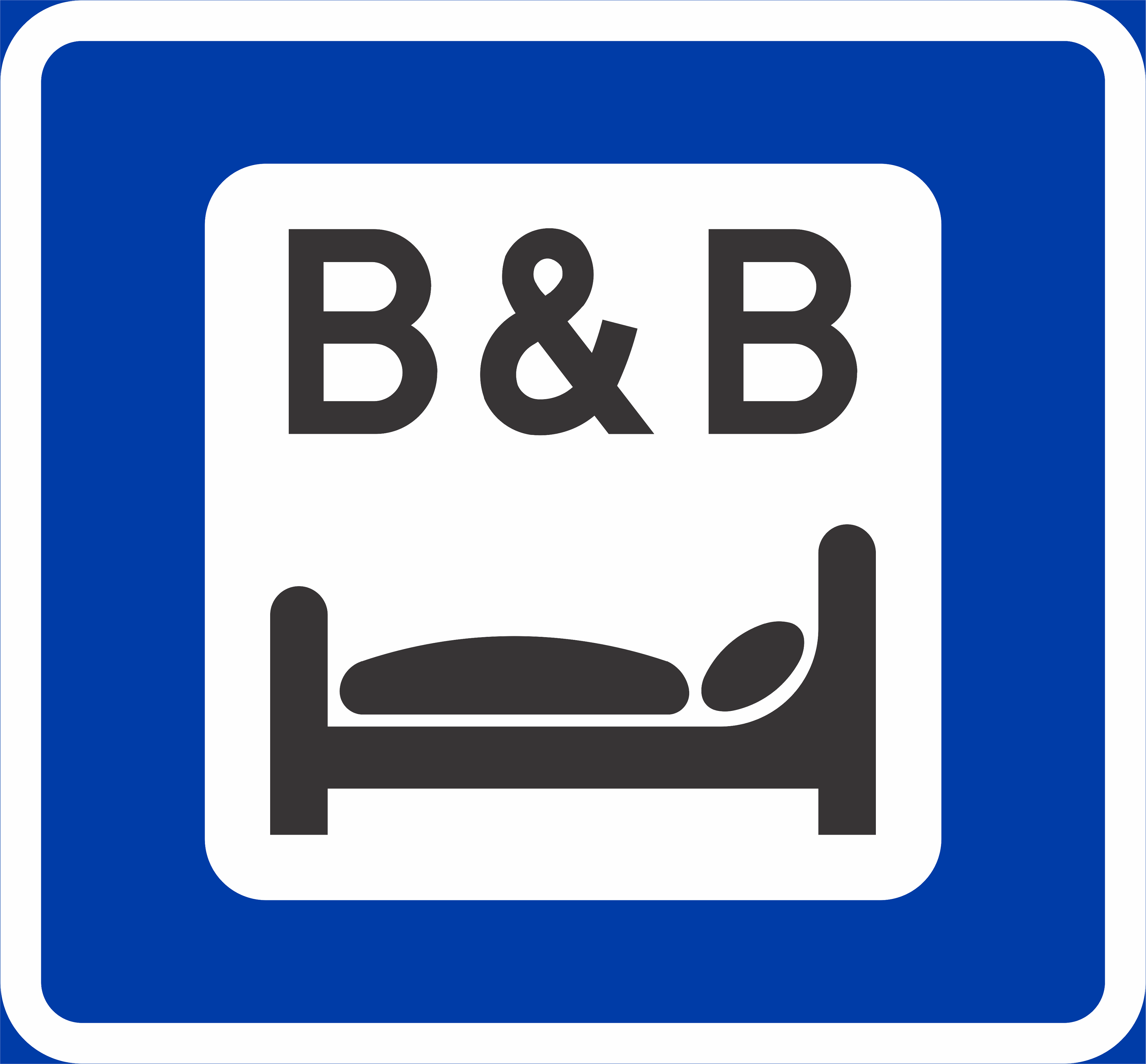
Bed & breakfast

Hotel

Information

Tourist information office

Attraction (Note: Symbol may be replaced by a representation of the attraction.)

Museum or art gallery

Viewpoint

Protected natural area

World Heritage Site

National fortifications

Activities, outdoor recreation, etc.

Fishing area

Hiking trail

Ski trail

Cycle trail

Traditional food and rural tourism

Olavsrosa (seal of quality)

== Direction signs ==
Direction signs inform about places, businesses, routes, choice of lanes, choice of roads and distance to destinations. Direction signs with a yellow background (blue on motorways) show geographical destinations. Direction signs with a white background (or white fields on yellow and blue signs) show local destinations. Direction signs with a brown background show destinations of special interest to tourism. Orange backgrounds denote temporary detours.

Distance sign

Motorway distance sign

Orientation board

Diagram orientation board

Exit board

Lane orientation board

Gantry orientation board

Board guide

Board guide

Regular destination guide

Exit guide

Lane guide

Gantry guide

European route

European route (Note: Dashed lines indicate a route that leads to the given route.)

Trunk road

Trunk road

Numbered province road

Numbered province road

Ring road

Ring road

National tourist road (Note: Symbol may be used on service signs.)

Detour for large vehicles

Route for vehicles with dangerous goods

Miscellaneous detour (Note: Indicates a detour where use of road names is not viable. One symbol is used for the entire route, so that different symbols may be used in the event of multiple routes. The line is generally used.)

Miscellaneous detour

Miscellaneous detour

Miscellaneous detour

Miscellaneous detour (Note: Generally only used under special circumstances, as some countries use this symbol on detours for vehicles with dangerous goods.)

Miscellaneous detour (Note: Arrows vary.)

Intersection number (motorways)

Intersection number (general roads)

Intersection number (general roads with a single lane)

City/urban area name sign

City/urban area name sign with symbol

County name sign

Municipality name sign

National border sign

Tunnel name sign

Street sign

Collective guide sign (Note: Destinations shown above may be reached by following that shown at the bottom at the next crossroads or exit.)

Detour for certain vehicles

Temporary detour

Temporary detour

End of temporary detour

Guide for pedestrians

Guide for bicycle route

Board guide for bicycle route

Bicycle route

Distance sign for bicycle route

Freeway

Motor traffic road

Toll road

Parking

Multistory car park

Airport

Helipad

Bus station/terminal

Train station/terminal

Ferry

Cargo port

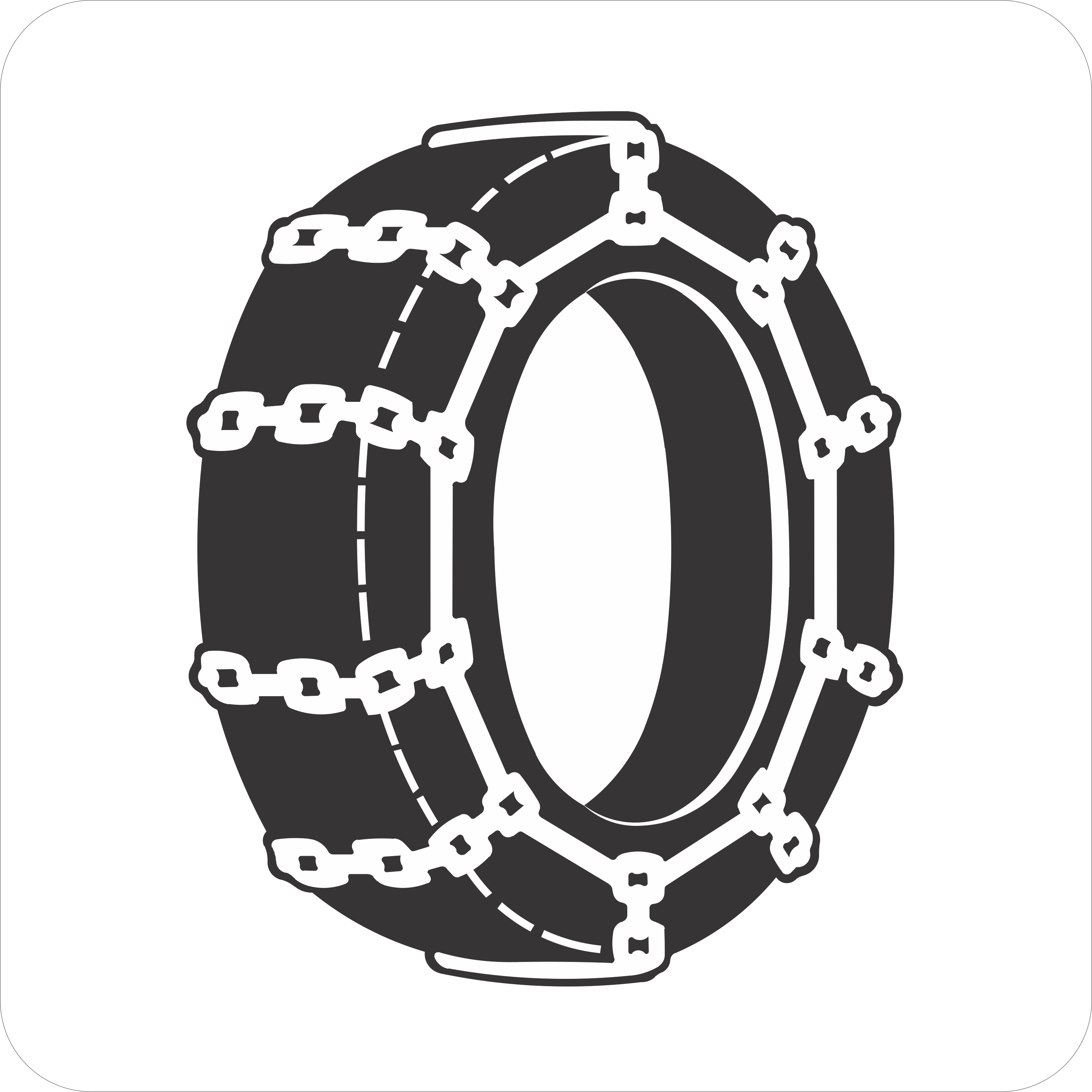
Suitable layby for equipping tire chains

Church

Industrial area

Shopping center

Swimming hall

Alpine facility

Ski jump slope

Ski arena

Golf course

Payment with electronic chip

Payment to attendant

Payment with coins to machine

Payment with card to machine

Payment with banknotes to machine

Remove ticket from closed payment system

Use ticket in closed payment system

Automatic toll road

== Supplementary signs ==
Supplementary signs are placed below other signs to indicate additional information, such as the distance, length, times of day or type of vehicle to which it applies.

Distance

Length

Time (Note: Black numbers in parentheses apply on Saturdays, and red numbers apply on Sundays and official holidays.)

Car

Light commercial vehicle, lorry and tractor unit

Bus

Vehicle with trailer

Trailer furnished for camping (caravan)

Bicycle and small electric vehicle

Motorcycle and moped

Handicapped driver

Vehicle furnished for camping (motorhome)

Small electric vehicle

Other information (Note: Used when there are no symbols that represent the regulation or information. Example: except buses and taxis.)

Turn arrow (Note: Arrows vary. Main sign applies after the turn.)

Recommended speed

Uphill inclination

Downhill inclination

Actual available width

Crossing lumber transport

Particular danger of accident (Note: Symbol varies.)

Course of priority road (Note: Symbol varies. Priority road is represented by the thick line. Roads represented by thin lines have give way or stop signs for the priority road.)

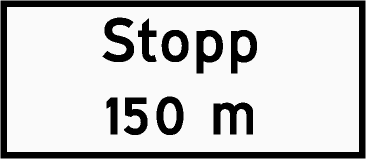
Advance warning for stop sign

Bicycle traffic in both directions

Direction of stopping or parking restrictions

Direction of stopping or parking restrictions

Direction of stopping or parking restrictions

Arrangement for parked vehicles

Disc parking

Combined regulation

== Marker signs ==
Marker signs inform drivers of a road's onward course, or warn of obstacles near or on the road. Temporary marker signs, e.g. during roadworks, use a red background colour.

Directional marker

Directional marker

Directional marker

Directional marker

Obstacle marker (keep left)

Obstacle marker (keep right)

Obstacle marker (pass on either side)

Obstacle marker

Lanes diverge either side of the marker

Tunnel marker

Tunnel marker

Distance marker for tunnels (Note: Indicates the distance to each exit.)

Reflective post

Reflective post

Reflective post

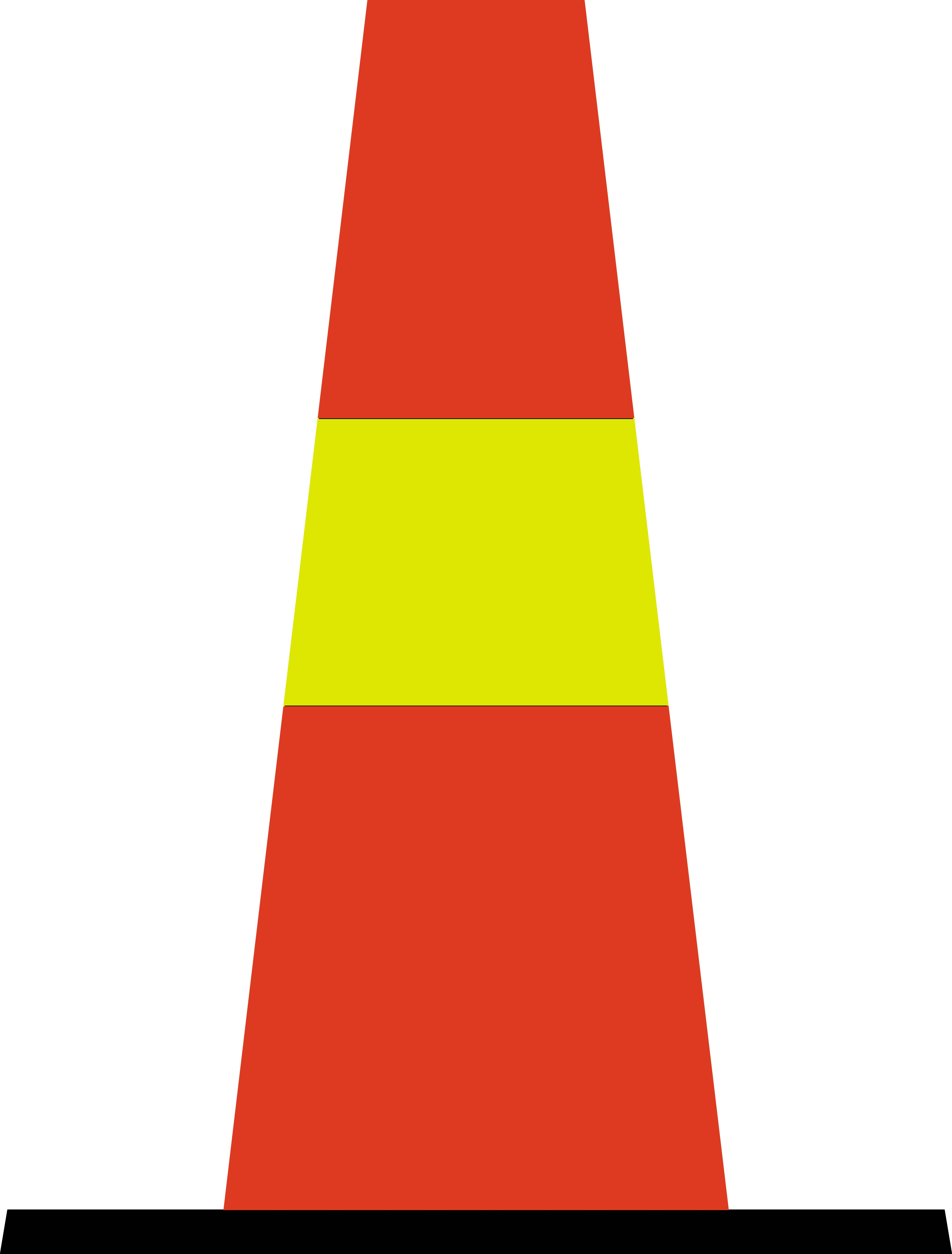
Traffic cone

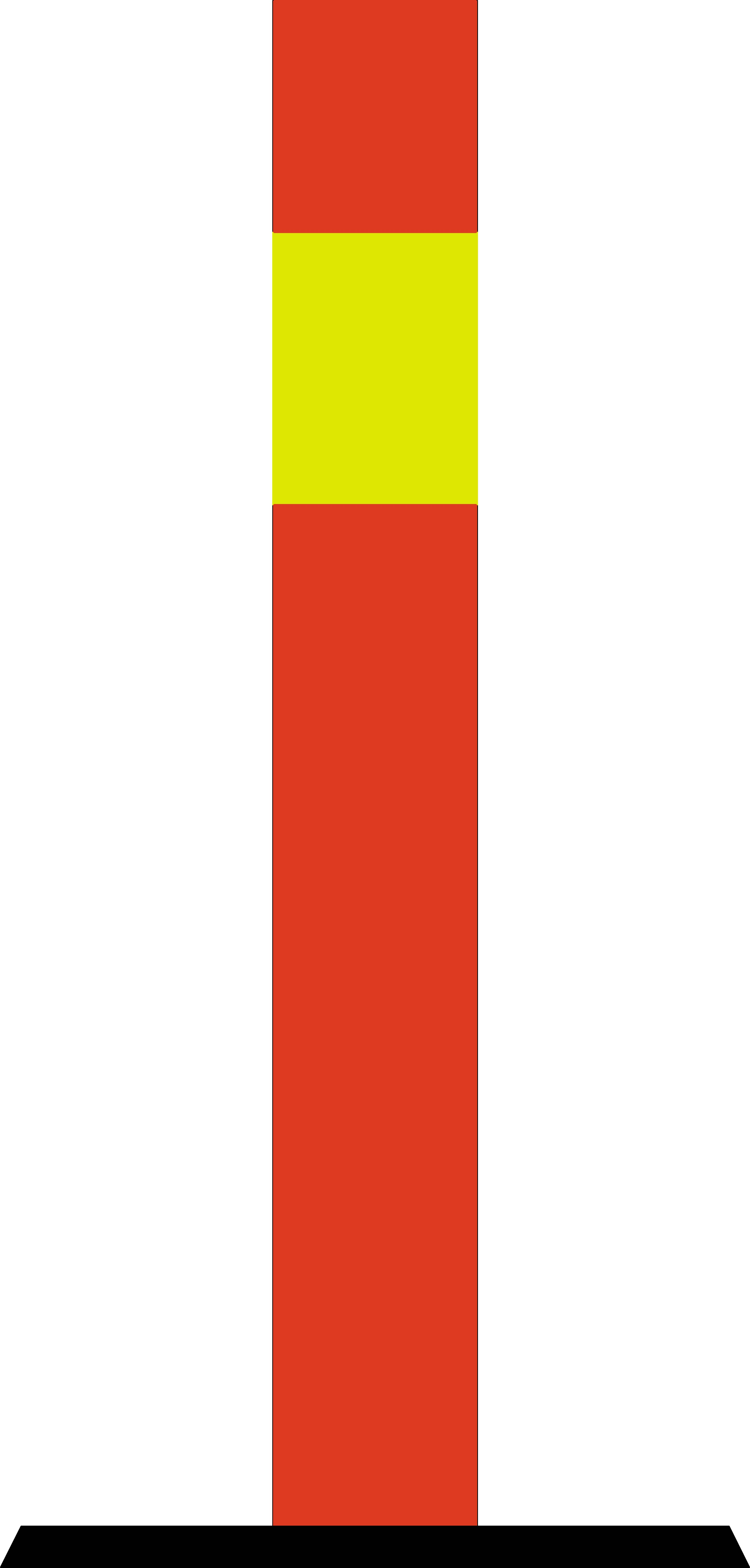
Traffic cylinder

== Historic signs ==
=== 1938 road signs ===
Uneven road

Series of bends

Crossroad

Level crossing with barriers

Level crossing without barriers

Danger

Yield

Stop (added only in 1949)

No vehicles

No entry

No motor vehicles except motorcycles

No motor vehicles

Weight limit

Speed limit

No overtaking

No honking

No stopping

No parking

Mandatory direction

Customs

Parking

Caution

Priority road

=== 1955 road signs ===
==== Warning signs ====
Uneven road

Dangerous bends

Crossroad

Railway crossing with gates

Railway crossing without gates

Road narrows

Roadworks

Pedestrian crossing ahead

Children

Crossroad with priority

Roundabout

Other danger

Yield

Countdown beacon

Countdown beacon

Countdown beacon

Countdown beacon

==== Prohibitory signs ====
No vehicles

No entry

No left turn

No right turn

No overtaking

No motor vehicles except motorcycles

No motorcycles

No motor vehicles

No bicycles

Width limit

Height limit

Weight limit

Axle load limit

Speed limit

End of speed limit

Stop

Customs

Restricted stopping or parking

==== Mandatory signs ====
Mandatory direction (turn right)

Mandatory direction (turn left)

Keep right

Keep left

Lane split

Bicycle path

==== Information signs ====
Priority road

End of priority road

Lane direction (turn left)

Lane direction (go straight)

Lane direction (turn right)

Parking

Pedestrian crossing

Passing place

Hospital

First aid

Public telephone

Mechanical help

Filling station

=== 1967 road signs ===
No motor vehicles

=== 1974 road signs ===
Pedestrian crossing ahead

Children

No motor vehicles

Pedestrian way

Cycle track

Shared-use footway

Ferry

=== 2006 road signs ===
Radio channel

Protected natural area
