= Olavsrosa =

Quality award

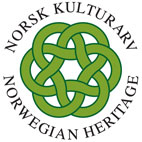
The logo of the Norwegian Heritage, with St. Olaf's rose, a magic figure from Norse mythology, as the central element

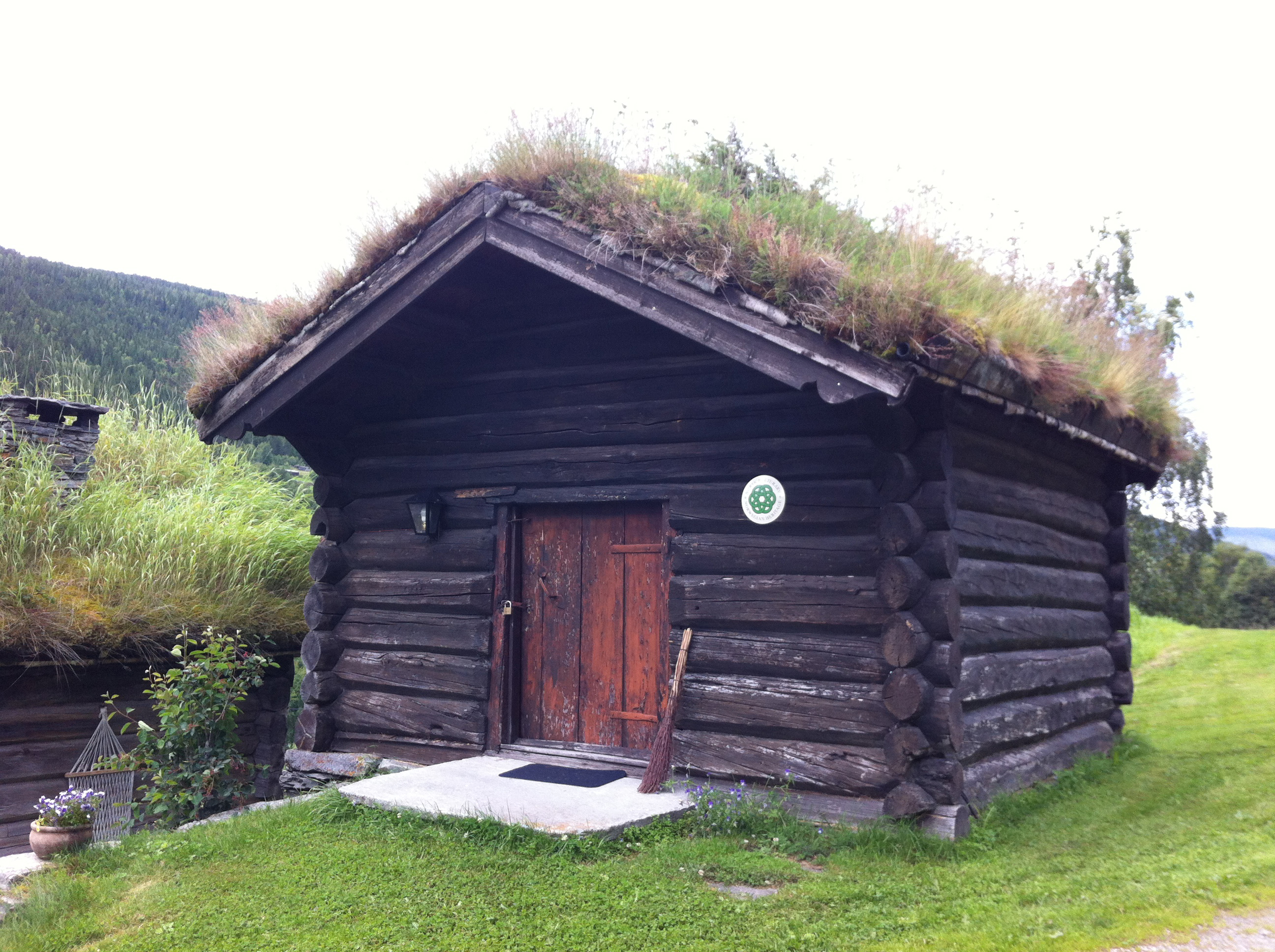
One of the buildings, "Aurbua", at Nordre Ekre farm in Heidal, with the Olavsrosa plate on the wall

Olavsrosa (St. Olaf's rose) is a seal of quality, awarded by the Norwegian Heritage Foundation.

The goal of the foundation is to contribute to the protection of Norwegian cultural heritage through sustainable use, under the motto, "Protection through use".

Olavsrosa is awarded to firms and institutions that offer activities and experiences of particularly high standard, with regard to the presentation and use of Norwegian cultural history. As of 2016, 131 firms and institutions have been awarded this seal of quality.

== Olavsrosa recipients (selection) ==
- Dalen Hotel
- Eidsvollsbygningen
- Isfjord radio
- Kongsvoll
- Krøderen Line
- Kvebergsøya
- Nordre Ekre
- Norwegian Museum of Hydropower and Industry
- Norwegian Sawmill Museum
- Numedal Line
- Parkteatret
- Quality Hotel 33, Oslo
- Refsnes Gods
- Ryvarden Lighthouse
- Sandtorg
- Sjøgata
- Skibladner
- Southern Actor
- SS Bjoren
- Sygard Grytting
- Utstein Abbey
- Thamshavn Line
- Ytste Skotet

== Literature ==
- N.N. (1998) Norsk kulturarv – ei praktisk reisehåndbok. Vågå: Norsk kulturarv. ISBN 8291988005 (Norwegian)
