= Nordre Ekre =

Farm in Innlandet, Norway

Coordinates: 61.7317°N 9.3697°E

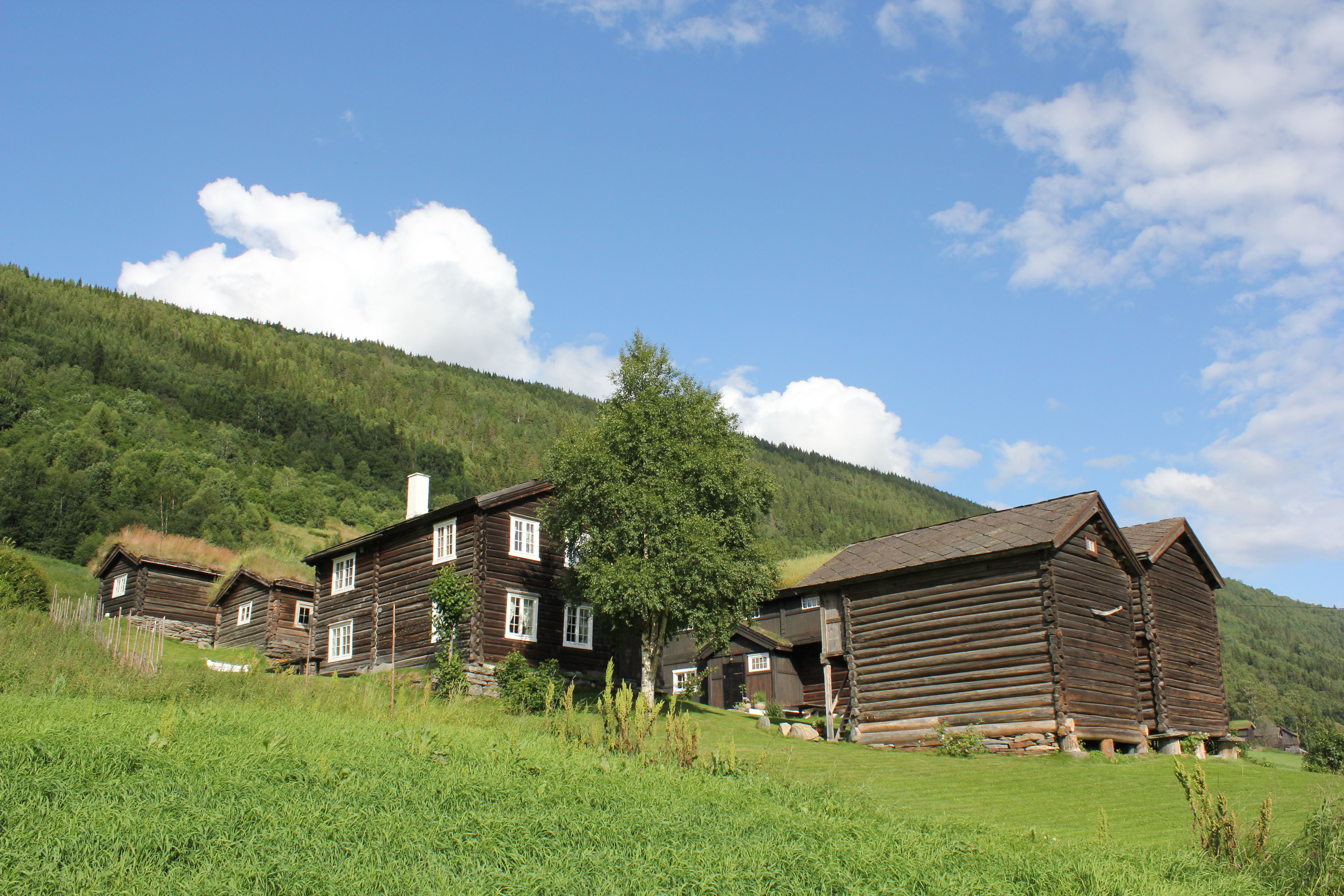
Nordre Ekre seen from the west, 2012

Nordre Ekre (cadastral unit number 189, property unit number 1) is a farm in the lower part of the Heidal valley in Sel Municipality in Innlandet county, Norway. Some of the buildings on the farm date back from the 18th century. In 2004, the then-owners were awarded the Norwegian Heritage sign of quality, Olavsrosa, for outreach activities and sustainable use of Norwegian heritage. Nordre Ekre has been an agritourism farm since 1995, in the early years based mainly on self-catering.

Today the farmland is leased to neighbouring farmers, and the tourist offering has been expanded with a restaurant. The guest rooms have also been upgraded, but with the emphasis on retaining the original style, with exposed log walls and the original soapstone fireplaces. Nordre Ekre farm hotel and restaurant is one of five farms that form the partnership «Gardshotell i Gudbrandsdalen/Farm hotels in Gudbrandsdalen».

Nordre Ekre has been designated as «Travellers' choice» four years in a row (2013–2016) by the travel website TripAdvisor.

== Name ==
The first part of the name, nordre, is Norwegian for "northernmost" or "northern". The oldest documented use of the main name, «Ekre», in the dative case and in the spelling of the period, is from 1333 when Sigurd, Hafthor Thoressön's vassal, wrote «Ek var a Eckru» (I was at Ekra). The name suggests that the farm originally was an arable piece of land, that had been separated from another farm. Oluf Rygh provided this etymology in Norske Gaardnavne (Norwegian Farm names) from 1897: «Ekra f., to field with grass, derived from Ager, derived from akr.» Rygh listed several documented forms of the name, e.g. «Ekren» in 1520, and «Ecre» in 1578.

== History ==
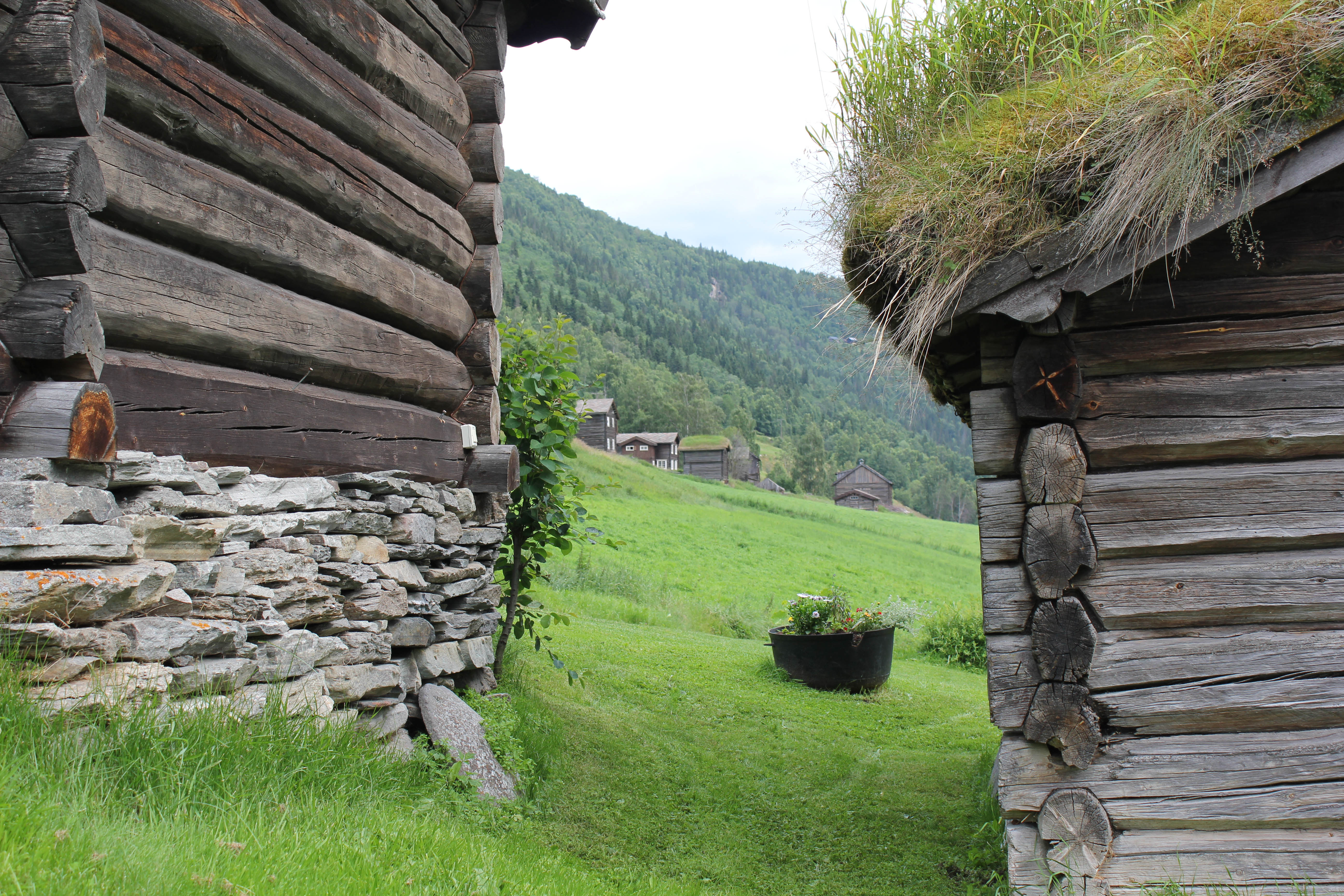
Søre Ekre glimpsed between Aurbua to the left and Eldhuset (the bakehouse) at Nordre Ekre

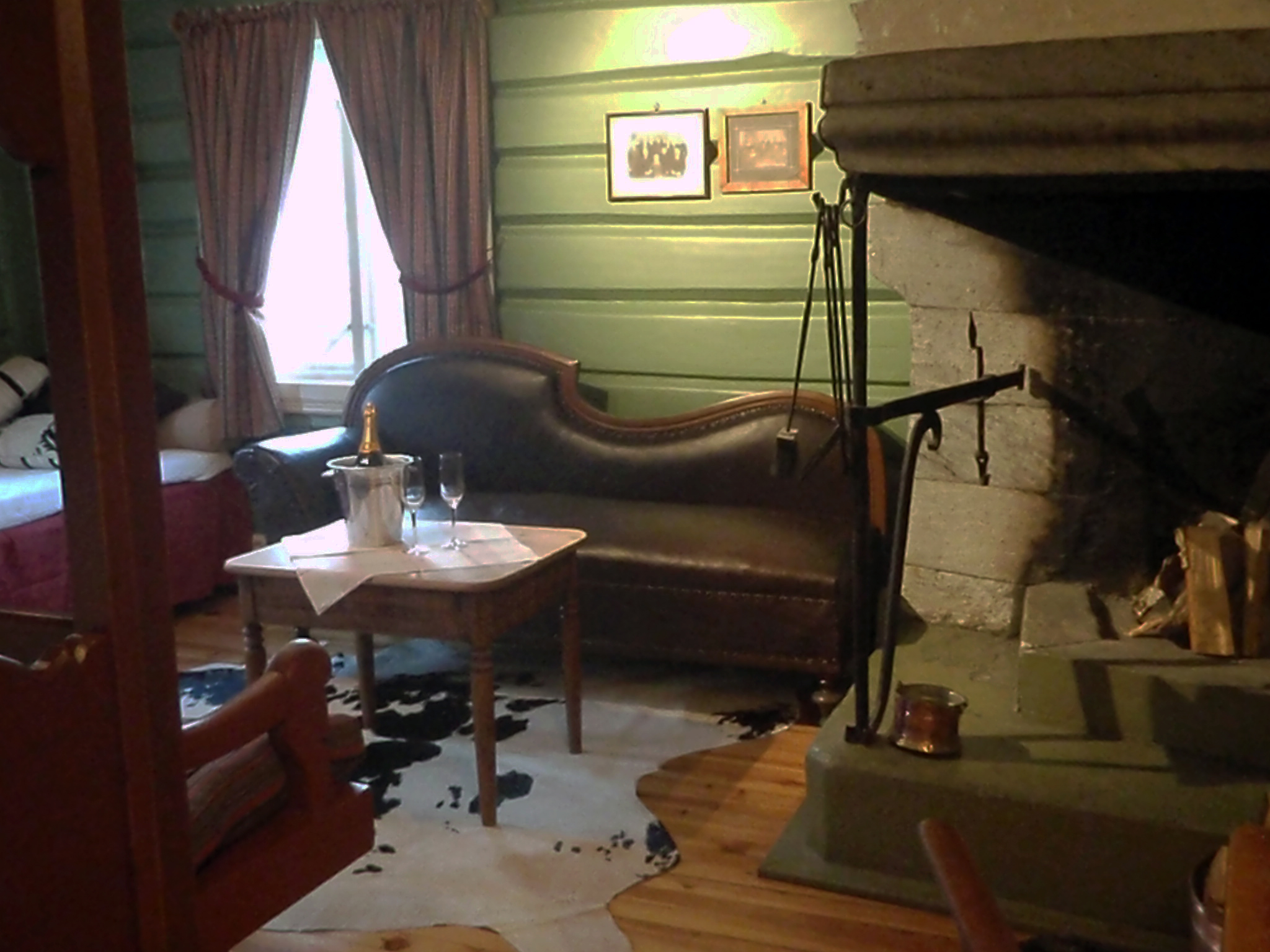
The green room

Nordre Ekre has roots dating back to the Iron Age. At that time there was only one Ekre-farm. In the 14th century this farm was a meeting place for things (assemblies) and court proceedings.

The Ekre farm has been divided several times. The first documented division was in the early 1600s. The farm later was divided into Nordre and Søre (=southern) Ekre. At the time they were located next to one another, where Søre Ekre is still located.

In 1851 Nordre Ekre was again divided into two farms, Nordre and Midtre (=middle) Ekre. It was after this division that the current yard at Nordre Ekre was established. There are currently no buildings on the Midtre Ekre farm. The land under this farm was placed under Søre Ekre in 1926.

There were dairy cows at Nordre Ekre up until 1987, and hay and forestry until 1995, but since then tourism has formed the production basis for the farm. Both land and hunting rights are leased.

Nordre Ekre farm hotel and restaurant are owned by a married couple. The wife is the eighth generation of owners in her family. The couple are both trained chefs, and since they took over the farm in 2005, they have upgraded the guest rooms and expanded the tourist offering with a gourmet restaurant in the former barn.

== The oldest buildings ==
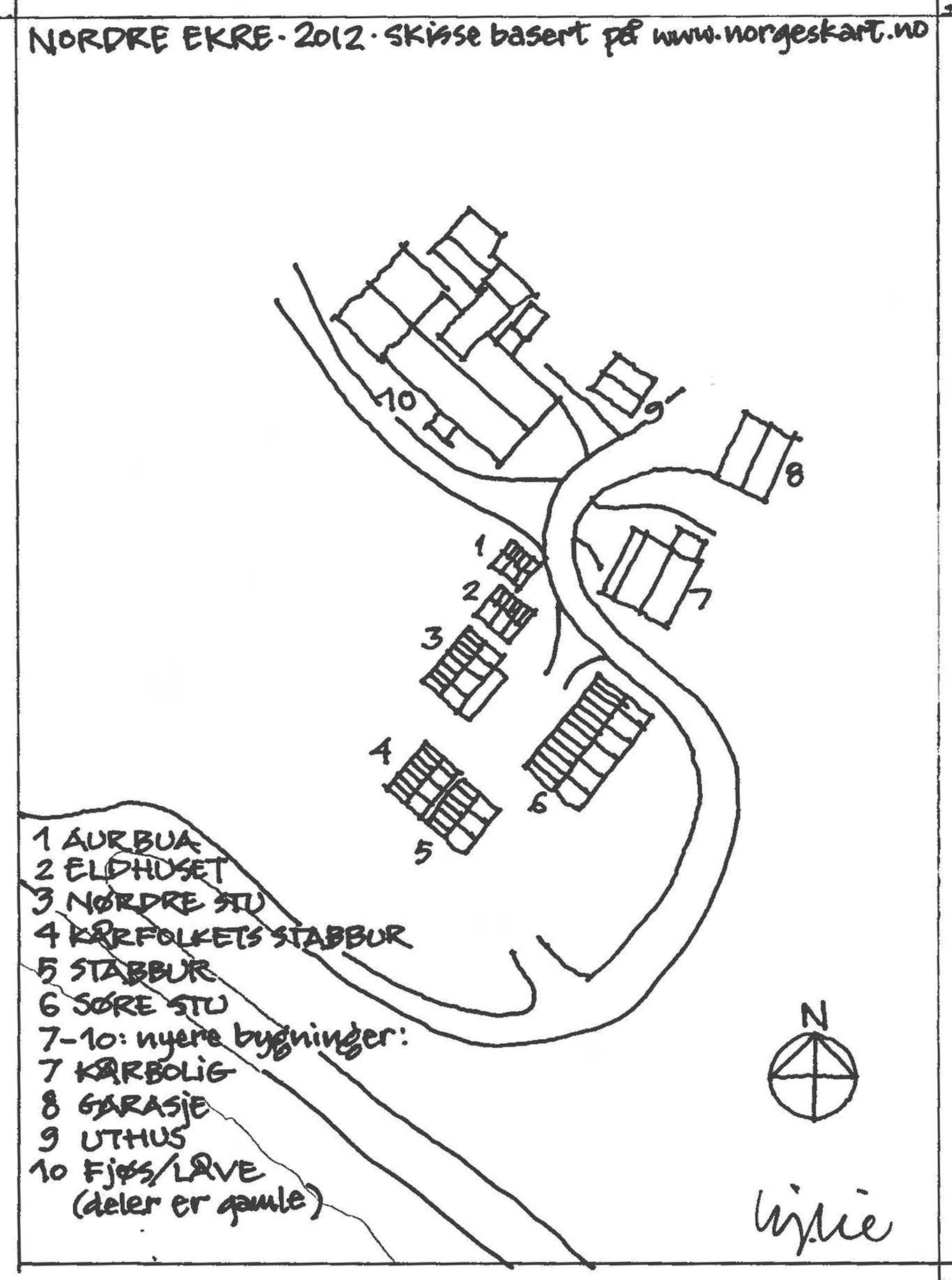
Site plan 2012

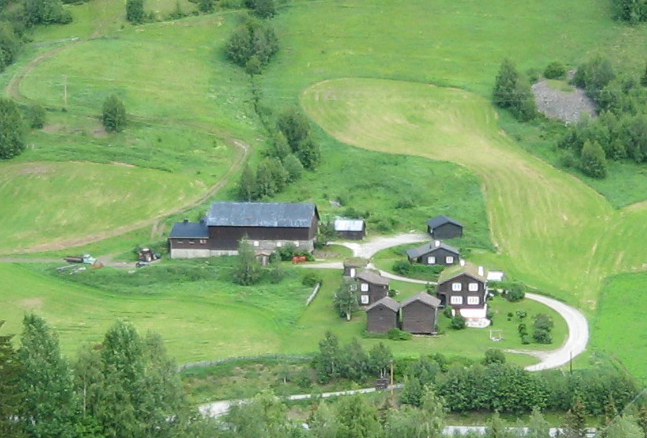
Nordre Ekre from the south-west, ca. 2005

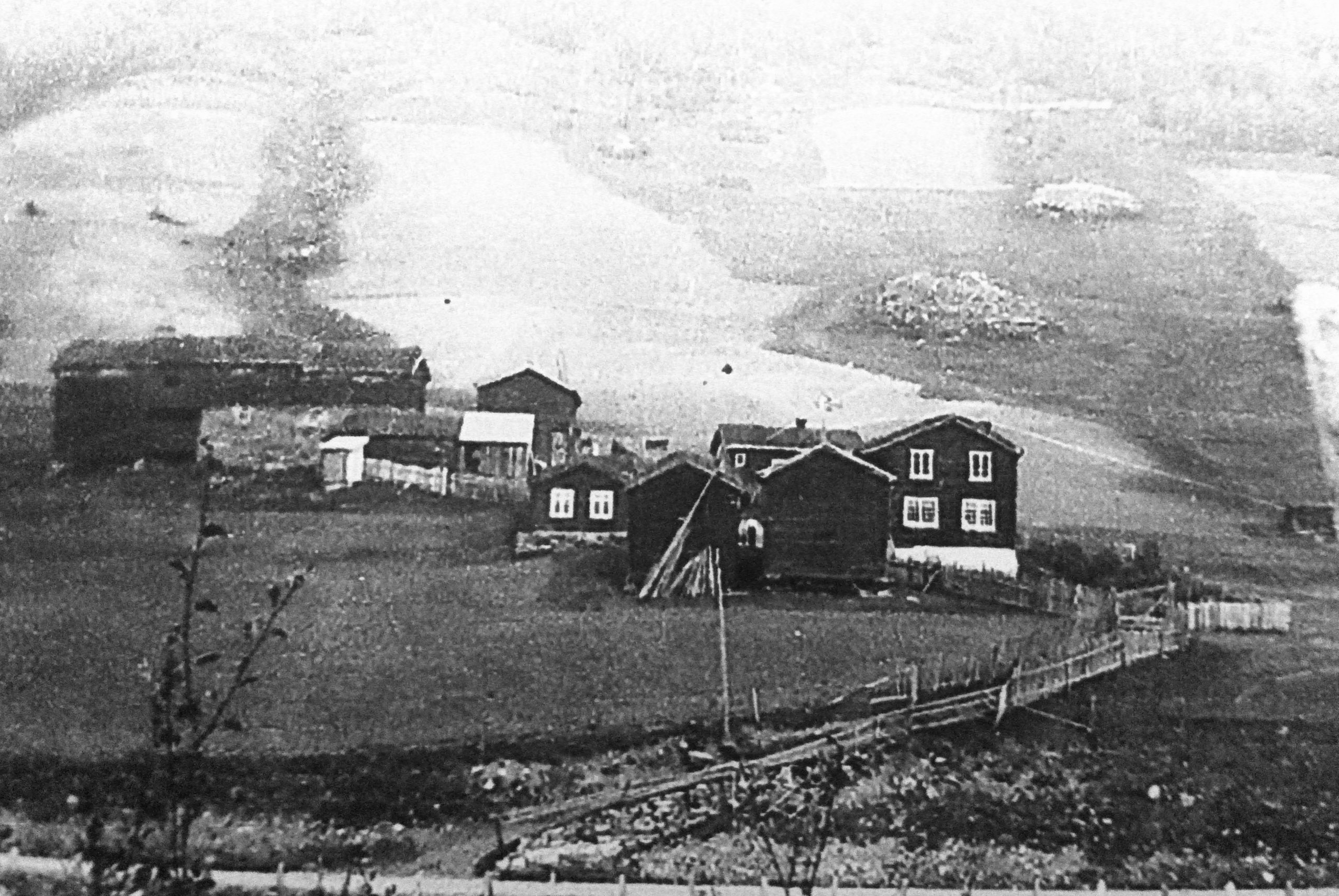
The farm seen from the south-west, early 1900s

When the current yard was established, after the division in 1851, it was partly with buildings from the former location, partly with new buildings and partly with buildings that were moved from elsewhere. Photographs from the early 1900s show more buildings than those which currently stand on the farm. Here were stables, a piggery and several other outbuildings, but the buildings were not so clearly defined in an inner and outer yard, as they are on some of the other Heidal farms. According to Norske gardsbruk the farm is thought at one time to have comprised 17 buildings, including the mountain farm (summer pasture) and cabins.

As farming changed over the years, more buildings were demolished and relocated. The stables were, for example, taken down and re-erected as a cottage, and the former barn was part of a larger cattle shed and barn, which has now been partly converted into guest rooms, as well as banqueting facilities and a farm museum.

The other six buildings from before the twentieth century today, form a not completely closed «firkanttun» (=square yard). The house lived in by the last generation farmers, is from 1976, and is pulled slightly back from the yard.

The buildings at Nordre Ekre are not listed or preserved, but the farm is part of the important cultural building environment and cultural landscape in Heidal, with and architectural finish, buildings and location in the terrain typical of the buildings in the valley from the 17th century onwards. All the buildings around the yard are log houses from before 1900, and all, except for «Aurbua», are registered by the Norwegian Directorate for Cultural Heritage, in SEFRAK, a national register of old buildings and other national heritage sites and objects. The buildings are dated «1700s» in SEFRAK. The dating, and the fact that no buildings remain on the former site, now Midtre Ekre, makes it likely that most of the buildings were moved to Nordre Ekre with the farm division in 1851.

- Søre stu

Søre is dialect for søndre=southern or southernmost. Stu is dialect for stue, which in this context means farmhouse. The name, or description, of the building therefore is The southern(-most) farmhouse. The building is said to have been moved here from Lom, but there is no contemporary documentation for this. In the 1953 edition of Norske gardsbruk the actual move is dated to 1848, while the register in the 1998 edition cites 1860 as the year the building was moved to Nordre Ekre. The latter fits most closely with the facts, since the yard was established in 1851. The house was extended in width around 1942, and in length in 1995. The building is the residence of the current owners. Until the spring of 2013 it also housed the restaurant.

- Nørdre stu

Nørdre stu=Northern farmhouse. This was the original farmhouse on the farm. After the erection of Søre stu, Nødre stu was used as a house for the retired farmer, until around 1960. At the time the building was moved here from its previous location, it only had one storey. The second storey was added in 1940, and the sod roof was also replaced with flat, hewn slate tiles. The building now contains four en suite guest rooms.

- Aurbua

Aur=gravel, bua=the store room. This was the farm's cold storage. The building originally stood where today's kitchen in Søre stu is located. It was moved to the current location when Søre stu was expanded in 1995. The building is currently used as a farm shop. Aurbua is not mentioned specifically in the SEFRAK register.

- Eldhuset

Eld=fire, huset=the house. This building is the farm's bakehouse, and has a wood fired traditional flat top baking oven and chimney, although its location, right among the other farm buildings, makes it unlikely that it was meant to be used as a bakehouse when it was moved to this location. Today the building is used for baking traditional flatbrød and lefse for – and on – special occasions, such as during the annual event «Gardmillom».

- Stabburet

The storehouse. As with the other buildings, the date of the storehouse is uncertain. It is dated to the 1800s in the SEFRAK register and to the 1700s in vol. 2 of Gards- og slektshistorie for Heidal (=Farmstead and family history in Heidal). It was moved to the current location from the old yard. Today it is furnished to provide guest accommodation on both the ground and first floors.

- Kårfolkets stabbur

The retired generation's storehouse. This building was also moved from the original Ekre yard. It has now been converted into a library lounge on the ground floor, and houses an en suite guest room on the first floor. This building is believed to be the oldest building on the farm. It may have been built as early as the 17th century.

- Steinfjøset

Stein=stone, fjøset=the cowshed. This is the oldest part of the barn, dated to the 18th century in SEFRAK, while vol. 2 of Gards- og slektshistorie for Heidal cites 1870 as the year of construction. The barn was rebuilt in 1961 and expanded in 1980. In 2012/2013 it was completely renovated and converted into the farm's restaurant as it is today, as well as providing an additional guest room. The restaurant in the barn was opened in 2013, after having been located in Søre stu for some years.

The oldest buildings in the yard at Nordre Ekre

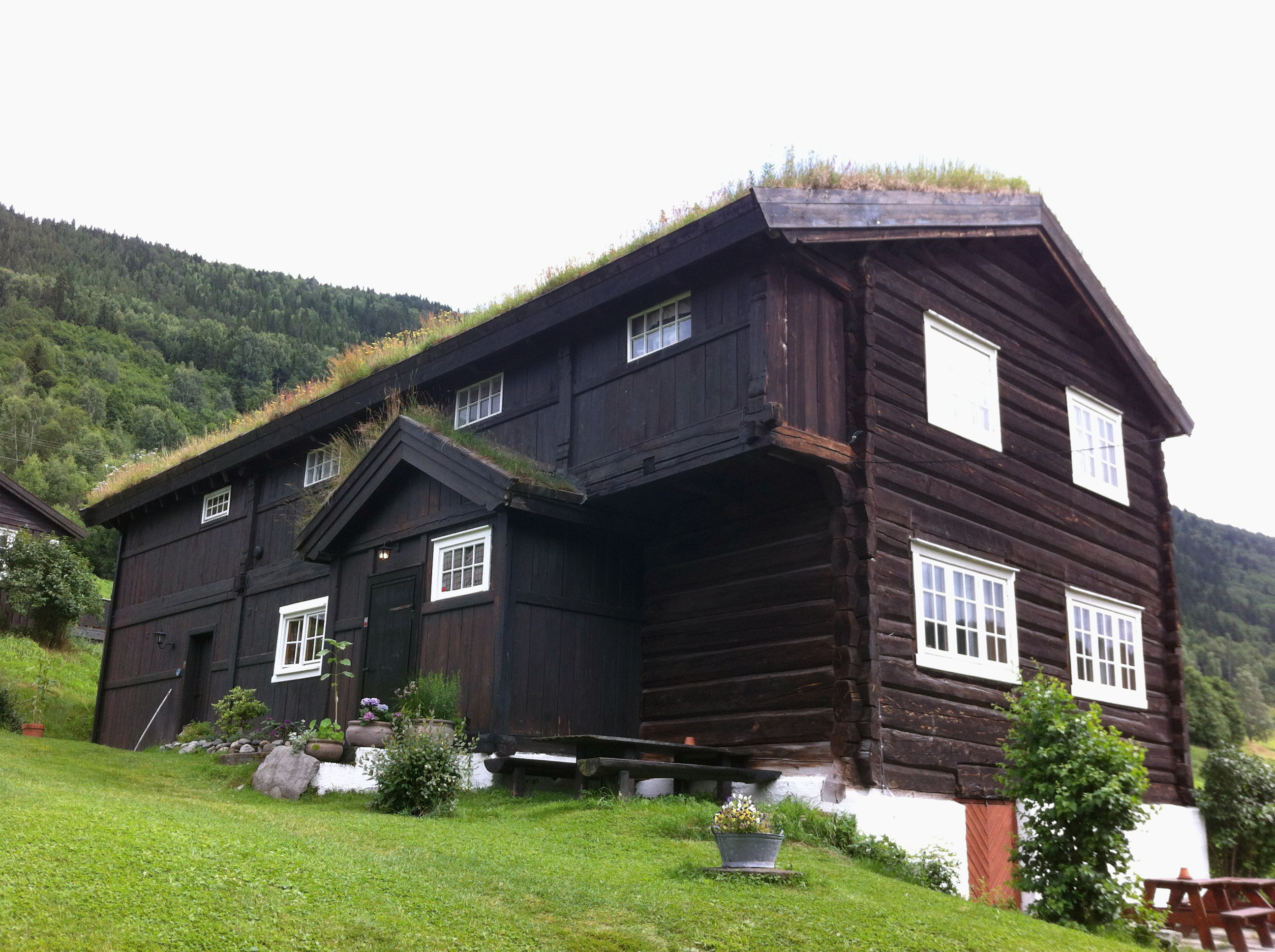
«Søre stu»

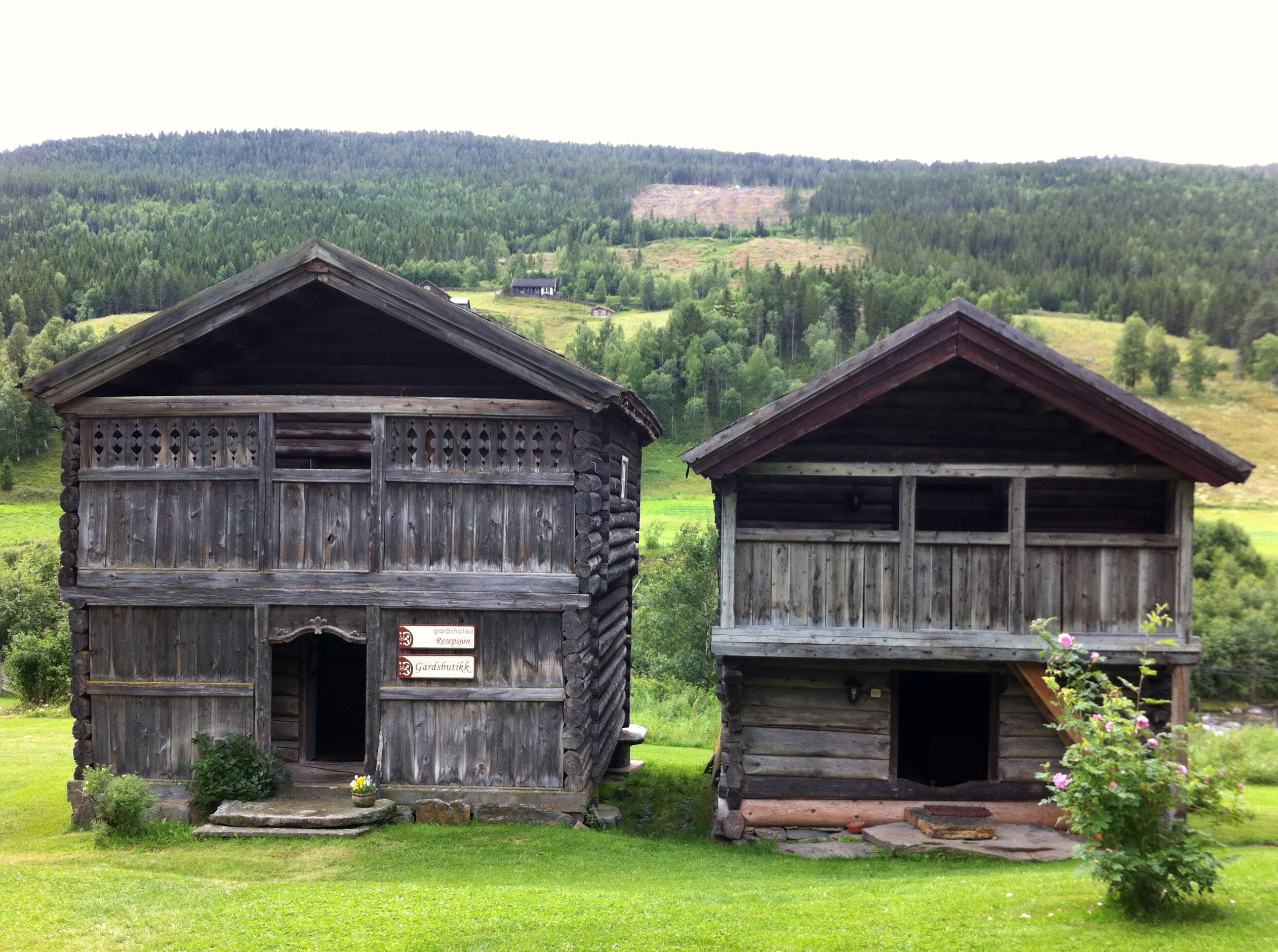
The two «stabbur». Kårfolkets stabbur to the right

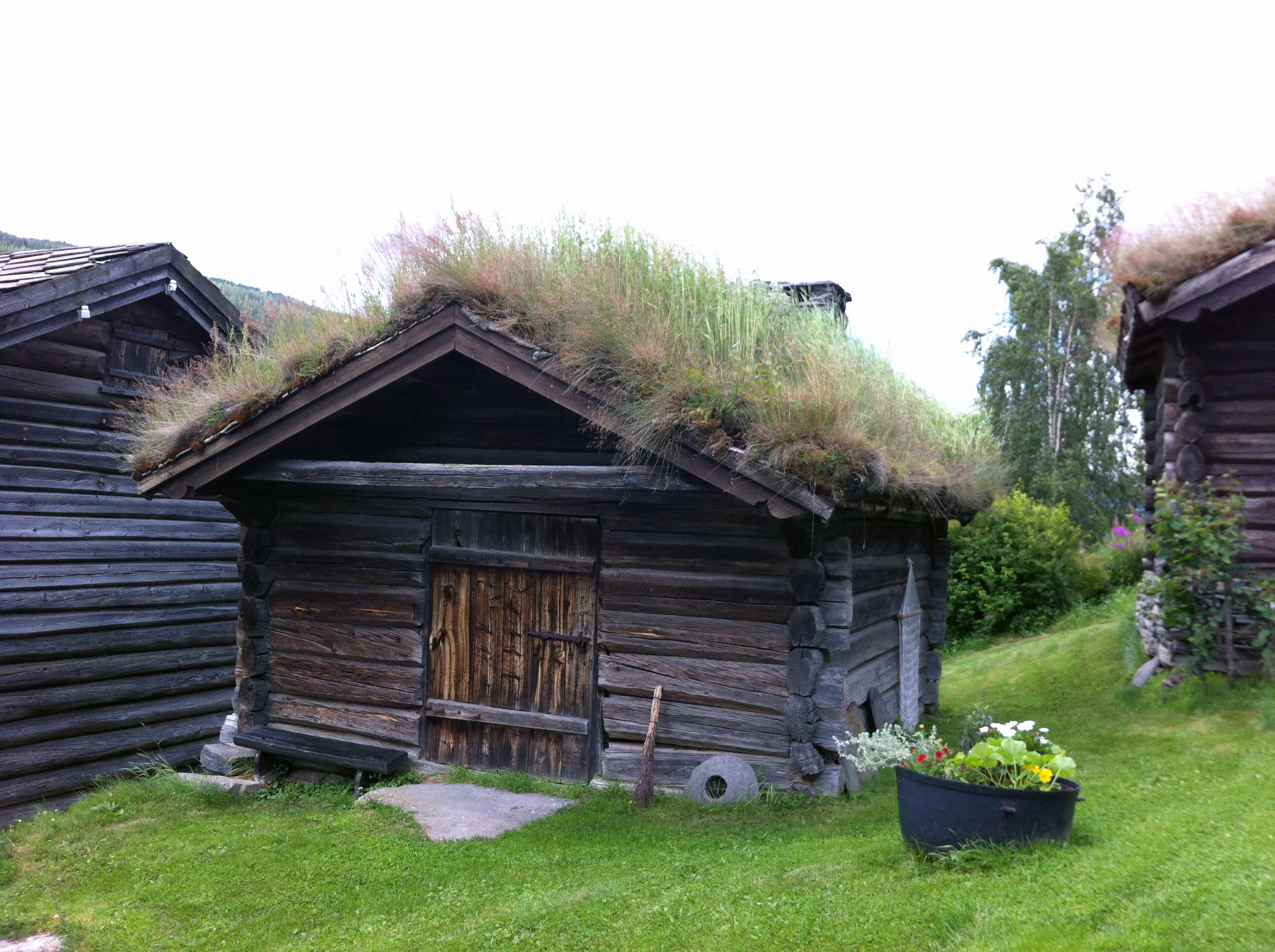
«Eldhuset»

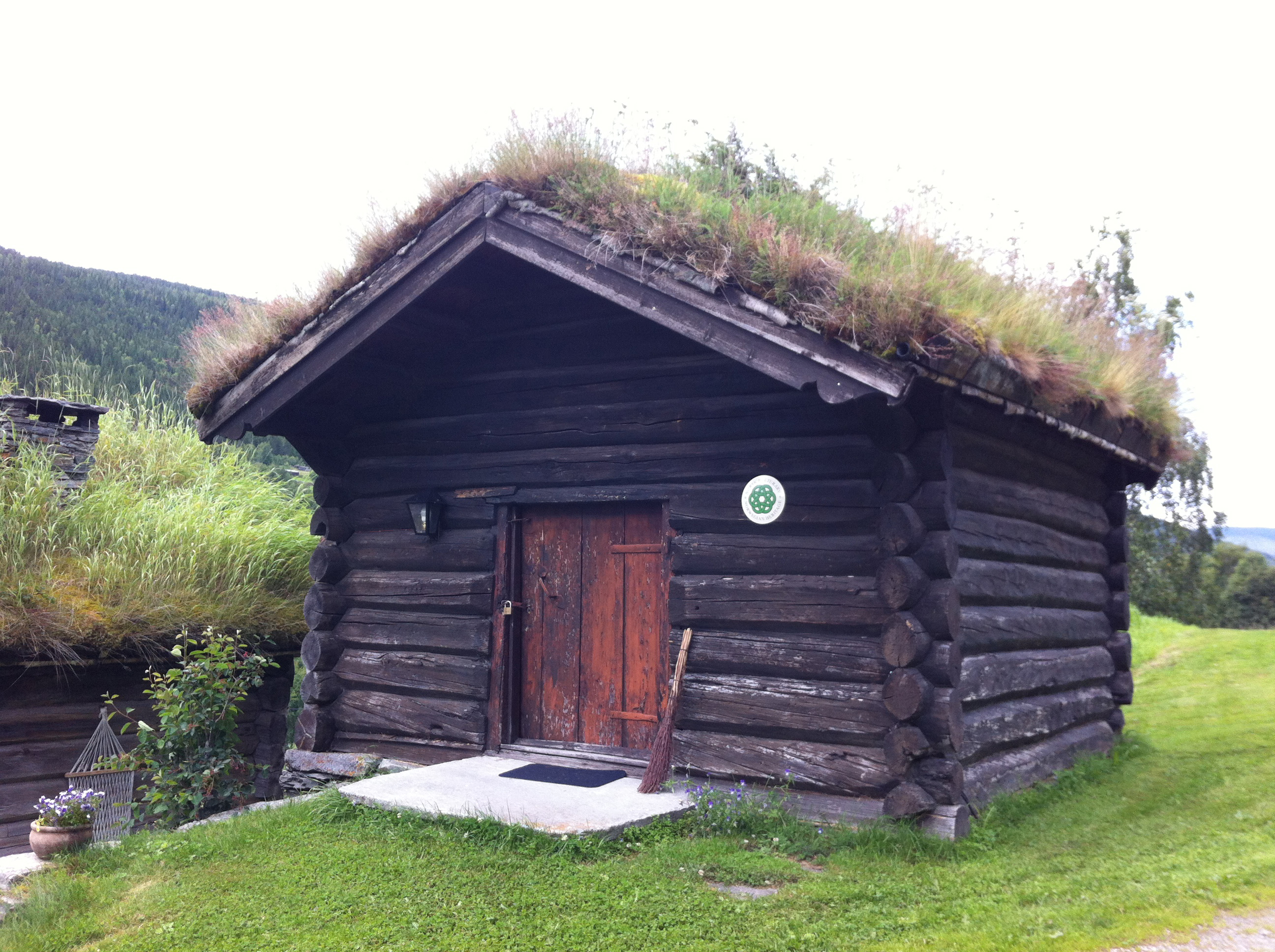
«Aurbua»

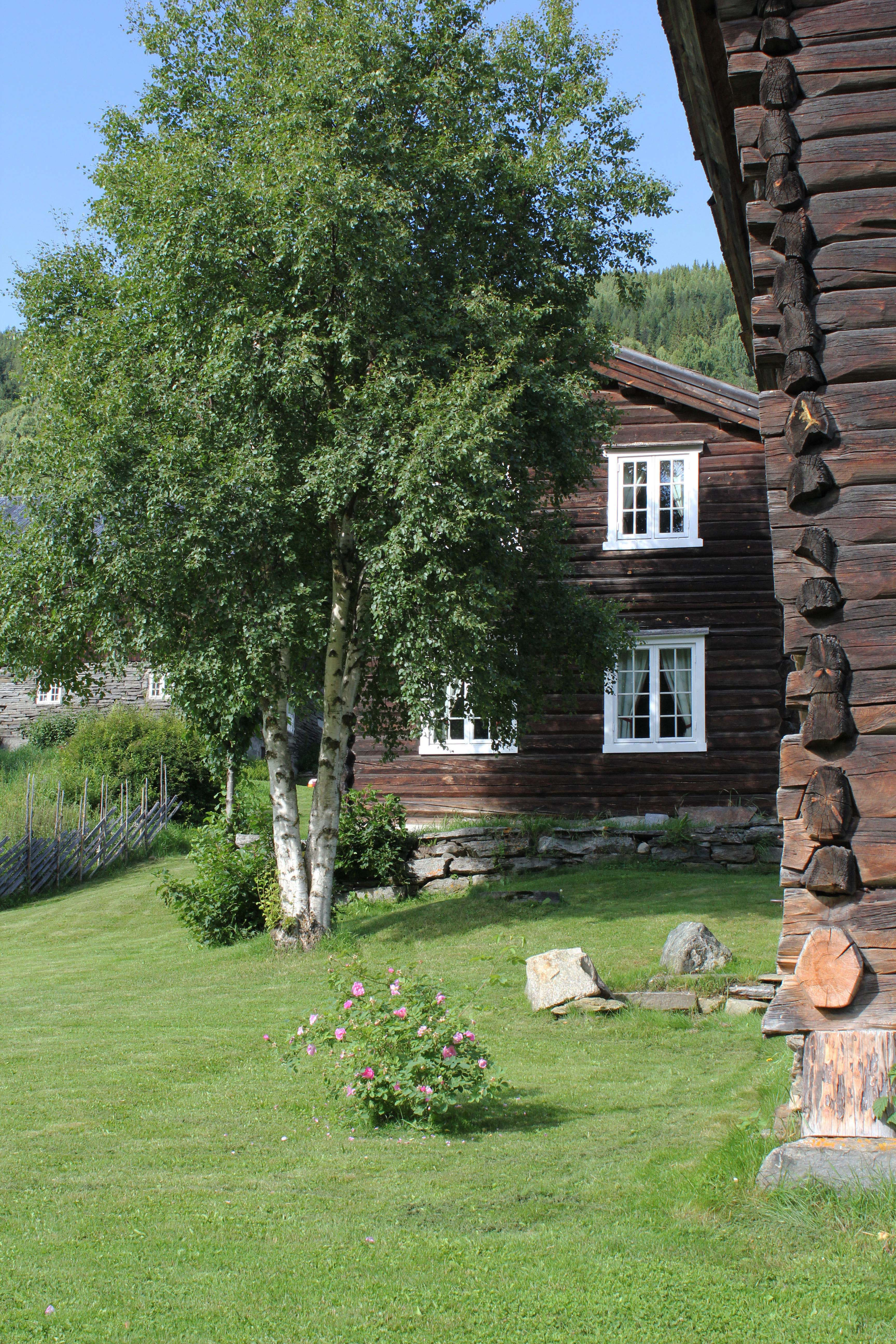
«Nørdre stu»

Like most farms in Heidal, Nordre Ekre also has a mountain farm or shieling. It is located on the west side of the Sjoa river, at the foot of the mountain Heidalsmuen. The buildings here were set up in the late 19th century. Today the place is no longer in use as a summer pasture, but is rented out for shorter or longer periods.

== Literature ==
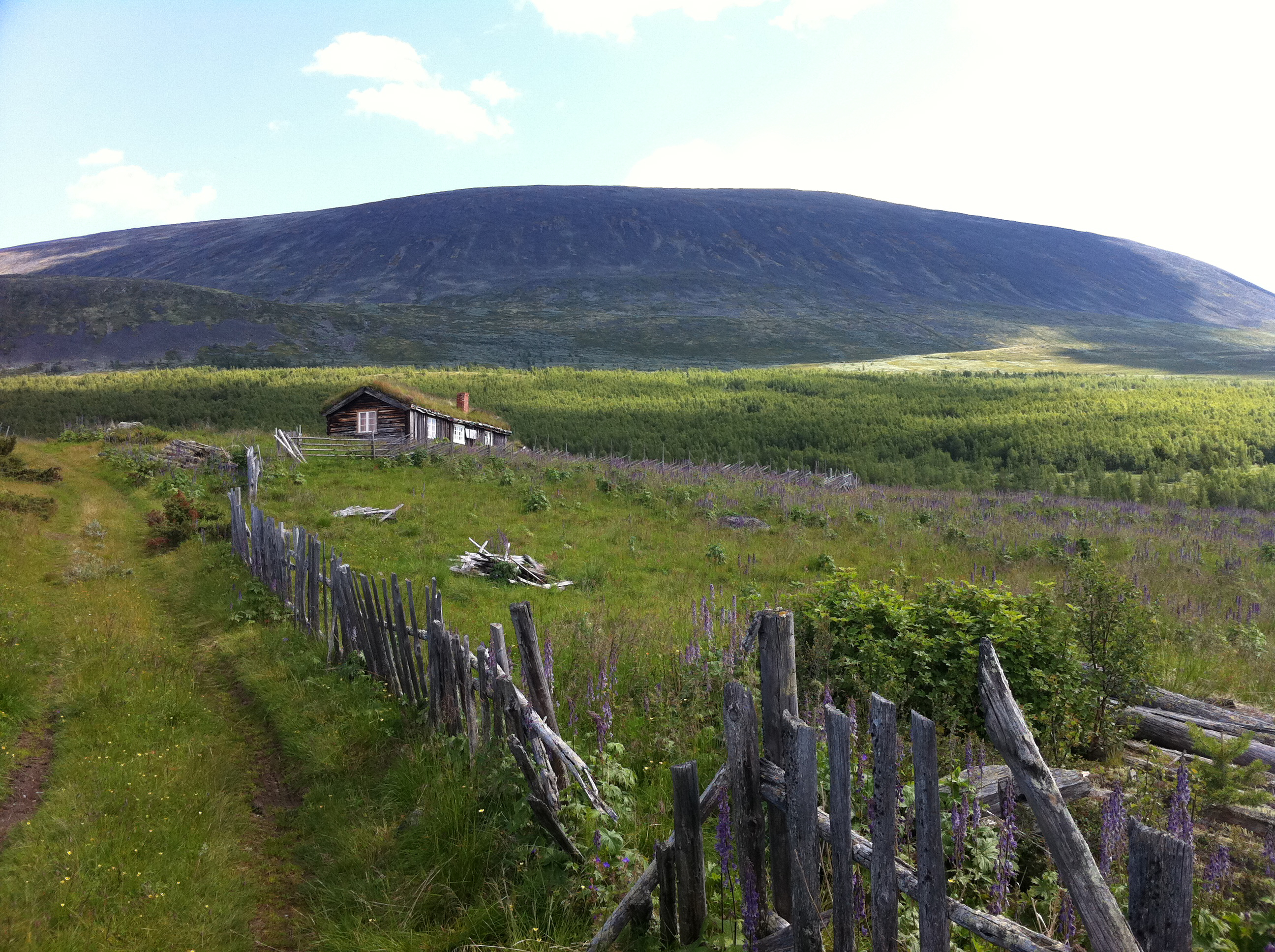
The main building of the farm's summer pasture, with the mountain Heidalsmuen in the background

- Egeland, John O. og Tone Solberg (2007) Arven som lever, s. 169–187. Lysaker, Dinamo. ISBN 978-82-8071-145-8 (in Norwegian)
- Engen, Arnfinn (utgis 2012) Gards- og slektshistorie for Heidal, b. 2. Lillehammer, Bruket forlag. (in Norwegian)
- Teigum, Ivar (2001) Bygdebok for Vågå og Sel. Otta/Vågå, Sel kommune/Vågå kommune ISBN 82-993503-3-6 (ISBN for b. 1) (in Norwegian)
- Valebrokk, Eva (2003) Gårder med særpreg, s. 56–61. Oslo, Damm. ISBN 82-496-0558-6 (in Norwegian)
