= Sygard Grytting =

Historic Norwegian farm and hotel in Sør-Fron, Innlandet

Coordinates: 61.5757°N 9.8918°E

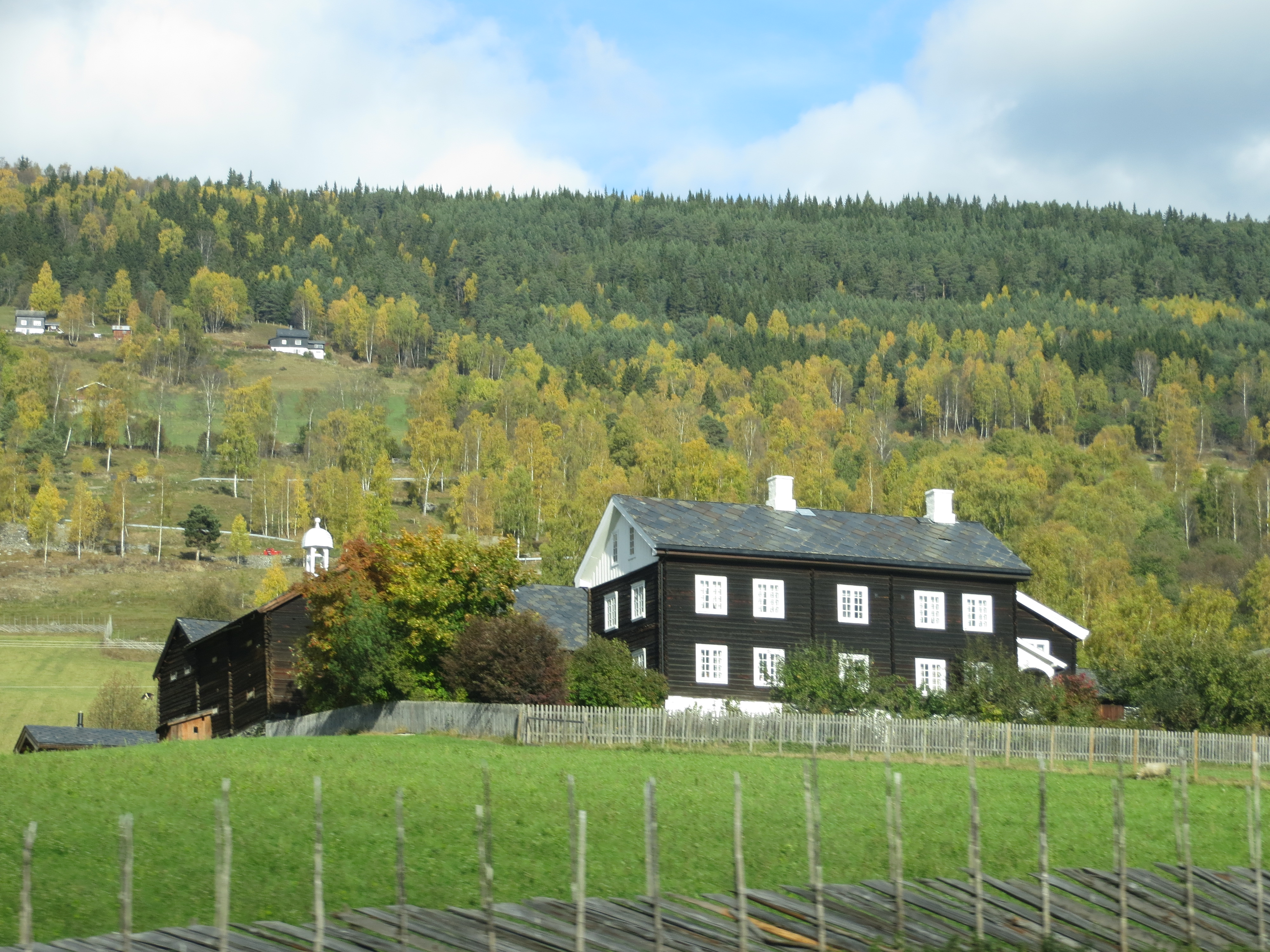
Sygard Grytting in Gudbrandsdal

Sygard Grytting is an historic farm at Sør-Fron Municipality in the traditional region of Gudbrandsdal, Norway. Agriculture specializes in sheep, grain, grass production and forestry. The main farm houses date from the period between 1650 and 1860.

The farm also has a long guest tradition. The former worker's lodge offers twelve guest rooms. From 1917 to 1958, there was a boarding house in the lower main building, which today operates as a historic hotel.
