= Road signs in the European microstates =

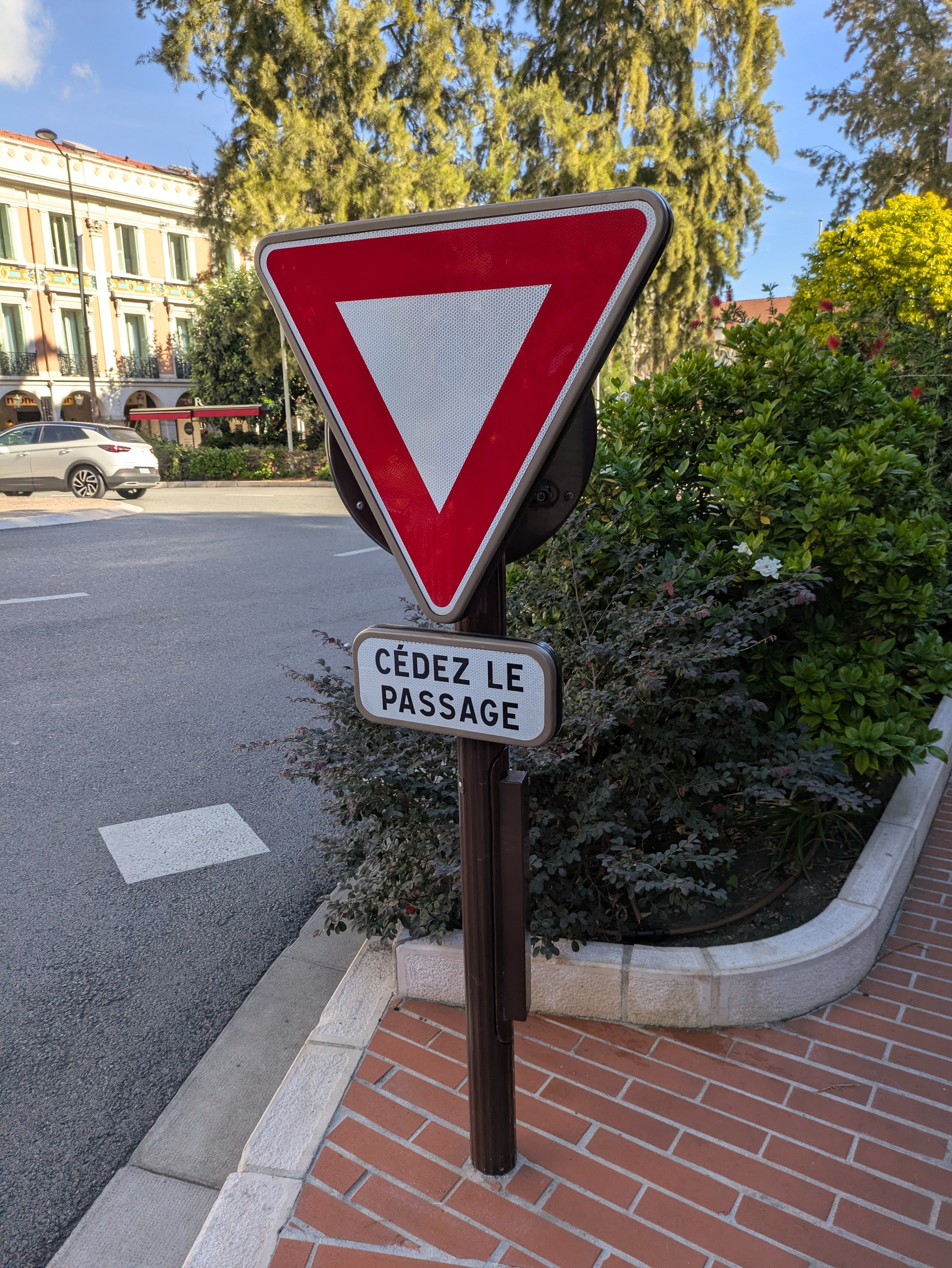
A yield sign in Monaco

Road signs in the European microstates Andorra, Liechtenstein, Malta, Monaco, San Marino and Vatican City (the Holy See) generally conform to the 1968 Vienna Convention on Road Signs and Signals. They largely follow the general European conventions concerning the use of shape and color to indicate their function as well as in most European countries. Out of all the European microstates, only San Marino and the Holy See have signed the 1968 Vienna Convention on Road Signs and Signals, both of which are entirely surrounded by Italy.

== Summary ==
=== Andorra ===
Road signs in Andorra maintain the same design as road signs used in Spain. Although Spain uses a new set of signage regulations as of 2025, Andorra has had its own signage regulations in place since 2021 and is not required to adopt Spain’s new designs, as it is an independent country.

=== Liechtenstein ===
Road signs in Liechtenstein are regulated by the Road Signs Act of 27 December 1979 (German: Strassensignalisationsverordnung (SSV) vom 27. Dezember 1979, LGBl. 1978 Nr. 18). They maintain the same design as road signs used in Switzerland. Liechtenstein acceded to the Vienna Convention on Road Signs and Signals on March 2, 2020.

=== Malta ===
Road signs in Malta are similar in design to those used in the United Kingdom, as the island nation was a British colony until 1964. However, Italian road signs may appear in Malta. Malta drives on the left.

=== Monaco ===
Road signs in Monaco maintain the same design as road signs used in France.

=== San Marino and Vatican City ===
Road signs in San Marino and Vatican City maintain the same design as road signs used in Italy. Both San Marino and the Holy See signed the Vienna Convention on Road Signs and Signals on November 8, 1968, and San Marino ratified it on July 20, 1970.

== Table of traffic signs ==
=== Priority ===
	(Andorra)	(Liechtenstein)	(Monaco)	(San Marino) (Vatican City)
	Andorra	Liechtenstein	Monaco	San Marino and Vatican City
Stop				
Give way				
Priority road				
End of priority road				
Give way to oncoming traffic				
Priority over oncoming traffic				
Stop ahead				
Give way ahead				
	Andorra	Liechtenstein	Monaco	San Marino and Vatican City

=== Warning ===
	Andorra	Liechtenstein	Monaco	San Marino and Vatican City
Curve				
Series of curves				
Crossroads (with priority to the right)				
Crossroads (with a minor road)				
Roundabout				
Traffic signals				
Two-way traffic				
Traffic queues				
Steep ascent				
Steep descent				
	Andorra	Liechtenstein	Monaco	San Marino and Vatican City
Pedestrian crossing				
Pedestrians				
Children				
Cyclists				
Domesticated animals				
Wild animals				
Road narrows				
Uneven surface				
Bump				
Dip				
	Andorra	Liechtenstein	Monaco	San Marino and Vatican City
Slippery surface				
Loose surface material				
Soft or low verges				
Ice or snow				
Fog				
Falling rocks				
Crosswinds				
Unprotected body of water				
Opening bridge				
Tunnel				
	Andorra	Liechtenstein	Monaco	San Marino and Vatican City
Low-flying aircraft				
Trams				
Level crossing with barriers ahead				
Level crossing without barriers ahead				
Level crossing (single track)				
Level crossing (multiple tracks)				
Roadworks				
Other danger				
	Andorra	Liechtenstein	Monaco	San Marino and Vatican City

=== Prohibitory ===
	Andorra	Liechtenstein	Monaco	San Marino and Vatican City
No entry				
No vehicles				
No motor vehicles				
No motor vehicles except motorcycles without sidecar				
No motorcycles				
No mopeds				
No pedal cycles				
No heavy goods vehicles				
No buses				
No vehicles pulling a trailer			(caravans)	
	Andorra	Liechtenstein	Monaco	San Marino and Vatican City
No agricultural vehicles				
No animal-drawn vehicles				
No vehicles carrying dangerous goods				
No vehicles carrying explosives or inflammables				
No vehicles carrying water pollutants				
Height limit				
Width limit				
Length limit				
Weight limit				
Weight limit per axle				
	Andorra	Liechtenstein	Monaco	San Marino and Vatican City
No stopping				
No parking				
Restricted parking zone				
No overtaking				
No overtaking by heavy goods vehicles				
No right turn				
No left turn				
No U-turn				
Minimum following distance between vehicles				
No honking				
	Andorra	Liechtenstein	Monaco	San Marino and Vatican City
No pedestrians				
Speed limit				
Speed limit zone				
	Andorra	Liechtenstein	Monaco	San Marino and Vatican City

=== Mandatory ===
	Andorra	Liechtenstein	Monaco	San Marino and Vatican City
Go straight				
Turn right				
Go straight or turn right				
Turn left or right				
Roundabout				
Keep left / Keep right				
May pass on either side				
Route for vehicles carrying dangerous goods				
Minimum speed limit				
	Andorra	Liechtenstein	Monaco	San Marino and Vatican City
Footpath				
Cycle path				
Shared pedestrian and cycle path				
Segregated pedestrian and cycle path				
Bridle path				
	Andorra	Liechtenstein	Monaco	San Marino and Vatican City

=== Special regulations ===
	Andorra	Liechtenstein	Monaco	San Marino and Vatican City
One-way traffic				
Pedestrian crossing				
Cycle crossing				
Bump				
Living street				
Pedestrian zone				
Cycle street				
Bus lane				
Tunnel				
Start of expressway				
Start of motorway				
	Andorra	Liechtenstein	Monaco	San Marino and Vatican City

=== Indication ===
	Andorra	Liechtenstein	Monaco	San Marino and Vatican City
No through road				
Hospital				
First aid				
Bus stop				
Taxi stand				
Parking				
Parking garage				
Lane configuration				
Escape lane				
Emergency lay-by	or			or
	Andorra	Liechtenstein	Monaco	San Marino and Vatican City
Advisory speed				
National border				
National speed limits				
	Andorra	Liechtenstein	Monaco	San Marino and Vatican City

=== De-restriction ===
	Andorra	Liechtenstein	Monaco	San Marino and Vatican City
End of speed limit				
End of speed limit zone				
End of no overtaking				
End of no overtaking by heavy goods vehicles				
End of no honking				
End of all previously signed restrictions				
End of minimum speed limit				
End of cycle path				
End of living street				
	Andorra	Liechtenstein	Monaco	San Marino and Vatican City

=== Built-up area limits ===
Under the Vienna Convention the begin and end built-up area signs imply a change between built-up area and rural traffic rules including speed limit. In many European countries the dark background with light coloured text version of the sign is intended for information only.

	Andorra	Liechtenstein	Monaco	San Marino and Vatican City
Entrance to built-up area		Liechtenstein: (main roads) (minor roads)		
Leaving built-up area		Liechtenstein: (main roads) (minor roads)		
Entrance to locality		NOT USED	NOT USED	
	Andorra	Liechtenstein	Monaco	San Marino and Vatican City
