= Michele Arcangelo Iocca =

Michele Arcangelo Iocca, born in Calascio on October 6, 1925, and died in Rome on July 9, 2023, was an Italian illustrator and graphic designer. He is known for designing road signs in Italy.

== Biography ==
In 1937, his family moved to Rome, where, as he grew older, he became interested in artistic drawing. However, at his father's pressure, he enrolled in a surveyor's school. In 1943, to escape the war, he returned with his family to Calascio, also becoming a draft dodger and being sentenced to death. After a few months, he returned to Rome, where he remained hidden at home. Thanks to meeting a journalist from Il Messaggero, he met the Palombi brothers, publishers of artistic works, for whom he drew illustrations for several volumes; he then collaborated with the magazines Carosello and Campanello, creating several standalone stories. After the war he completed his studies privately and enrolled in the faculty of architecture, which he abandoned without completing to devote himself to comics. During this period he collaborated on the creation of the titles Bambola and Lupettino, creating series such as Crestarossa, written by Eros Belloni. In 1952, during his military service in Pinerolo, he met the Turin publisher Paravia, for whom he illustrated a novel; in 1953, he ended his collaboration with Bambola and moved to Amichetta until 1957. Due to his poor earnings during this final period, however, having to marry in 1956, he accepted a job as a clerk at the Civil Engineering Department, where he remained until his retirement in 1990. From then on, he continued to collaborate with several publishers, signing himself Nat, after his wife, including through several agencies and with Sergio Rosi's studio.

His activity as a cartoonist continued through the agencies of Naro Barbato and Angelo Mancini, drawing comic series mainly for the French market, such as many stories by Il Grande Blek, for which he took care of the inking on pencils by Carlo Cedroni, and a La mine coinvotée on Special Kiwi in 1960, all his own for pencils and inks; while, for German publishers, he created the Piccolo Much series together with Alberto Giolitti.

In the late 1950s he created the new road signs for the new Highway Code which would be promulgated in 1959. It was inspired by the 1949 Geneva Convention on Road Traffic, which aimed to align all United Nations countries with similar prohibition, mandatory and warning signs, leaving the details to the various members.

Through the Rosi studio, he collaborated on several publications; he also created the last stories in the Maxmagnus series, published in Editoriale Corno's Eureka in 1983, inking Paolo Piffarerio's plates. In the 1970s he also designed the sketches together with his brother Angelo Iocca for various series of stamps issued by the Italian state.

Iocca died in Rome on July 9, 2023, at the age of 97.
