= Road signs in Spain =

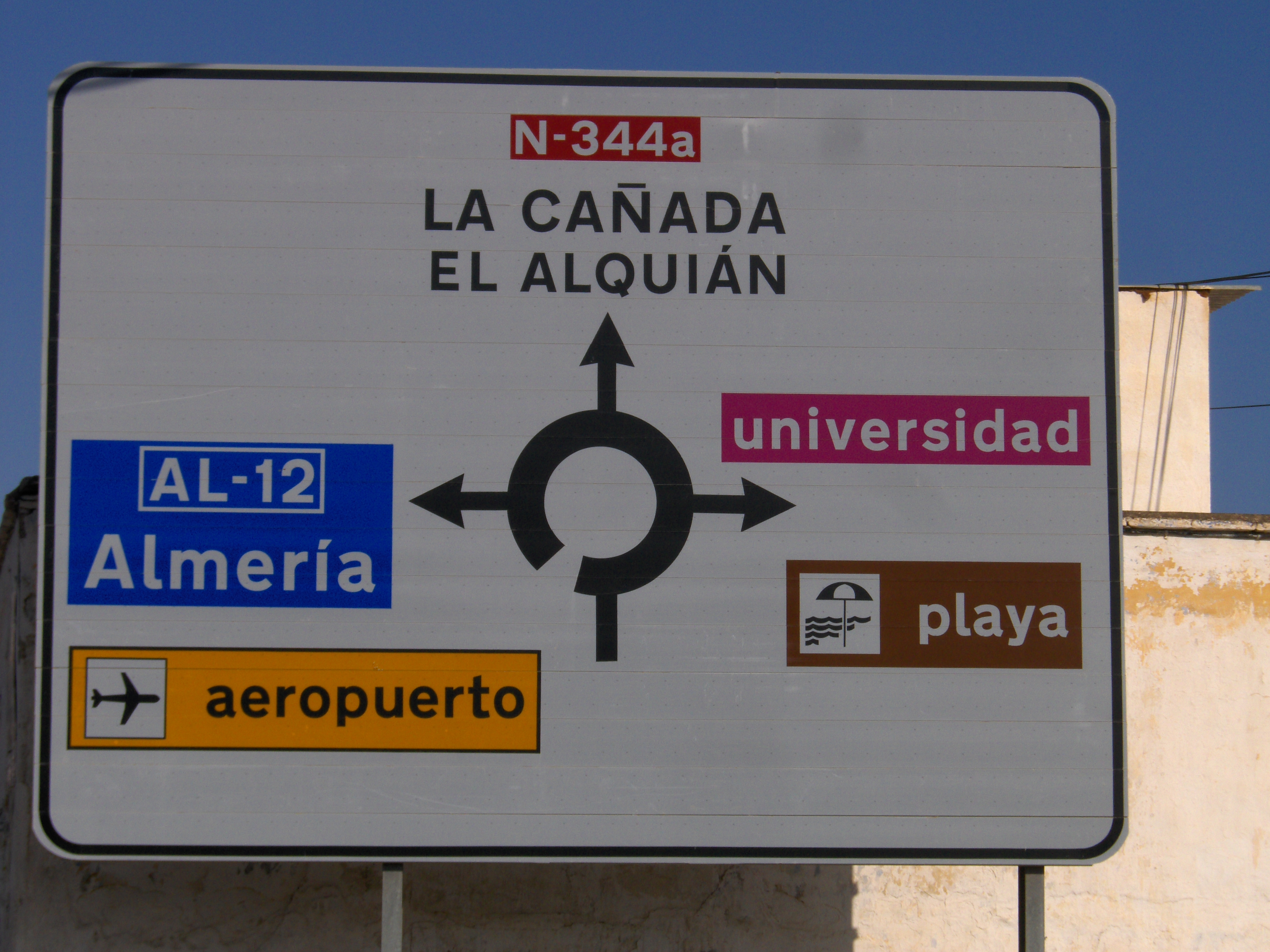
Sign to direct traffic at an entrance to the AL-12 road in Almería

Road signs in Spain are regulated in the Instrucción de Carreteras Norma 8.1-IC as well as the Catálogo de señales verticales de circulación. They conform to the general pattern of those used in most other European countries. Spain is an original signatory to the 1968 Vienna Convention of Road Signs and Signals, having signed it on November 8, 1968, but has not fully ratified it.

== Typeface ==
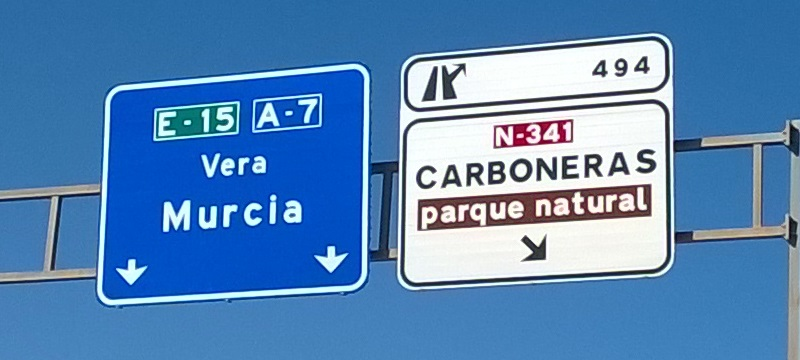
Use of the Autopista typeface on the left, and Carretera Convencional typeface on the right

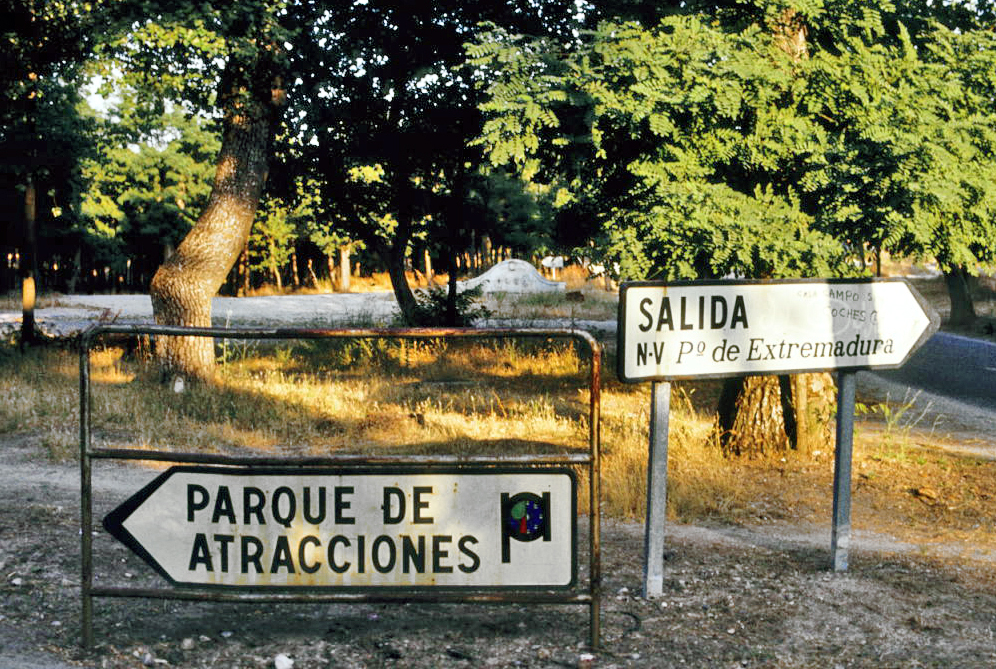
1969 standard direction signs

Carretera Convencional, also known as CCRIGE, is the typeface used on Spanish road signs.

From 1962 until approximately 1991, a French typeface predating Caractères was used on road signs. (Note: Compare caracteres normales, carecteres anchos and caracteres estrechos in the 1962 Spanish standard to caractères normaux, caractères larges and caractères réduits in the 1946 French standard.) Additionally, an italic serif typeface was used to indicate certain destinations, such as railway stations and airports. Autopista, derived from Highway Gothic, was introduced later for use on motorway signs following the opening of Spain's first motorway. From 1991 to 2000, after the publication of a new standard which introduced the Carretera Convencional typeface, work was carried out replacing signs from the previous standard. However, there still remain a number of signs from the 1962 order, perhaps made in the late 1980s, likely not replaced due to their condition.

On April 5, 2014, an updated version of the standard was published in the Boletín Oficial del Estado, which established Carretera Convencional as the only typeface to be used, regardless of the classification of the road, replacing the Autopista alphabet on new signs installed since then.

On certain stretches of roads within Catalonia, such as the AP-7 toll motorway, the Helvetica typeface has been used.

== Language ==
Bilingual signs appear in autonomous communities where languages in addition to Spanish are spoken, including the Basque Country, Catalonia, Valencian Community, Galicia and the Balearic Islands.

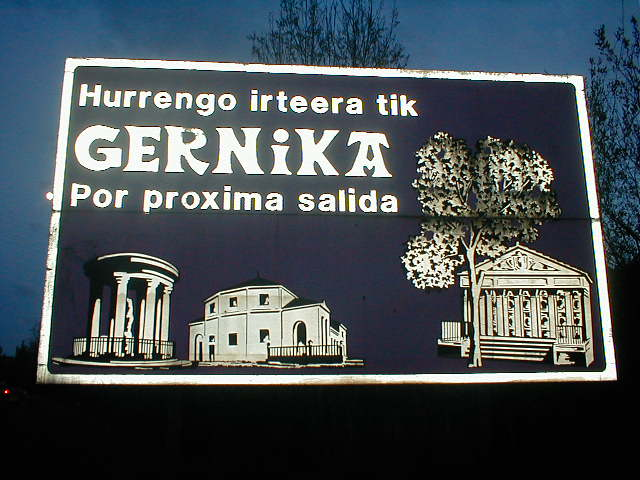
This sign does not follow standard Basque (Hurrengo irteeratik without a break) or Spanish orthographies (Por próxima salida with an accented ⟨ó⟩). It also uses a Basque font for Gernika.

According to the standard, only the official names of towns and communities may appear on signs. In the event that there is no official place name, the place name is first written in the regional language followed by a slash and the place name in Spanish. Where there is a lack of space, the place names are placed on two lines, with the name in the local language shown first followed by that in Spanish, with a horizontal line between them. No distinction is made in typography between both languages.

In the event that the official place name differs greatly from its Spanish version and the latter appears on the Official Road Map, both are written.

== General danger signs ==
Below is a detailed and specific list of the signs adopted by regulations on public roads in Spain. The danger warning traffic signs approved and in common use in Spain since 1991 and 2025 are the following:

P-1
Intersection with priority

P-1a
Intersection with priority on the road on the right

P-1b
Intersection with priority on road on the left

P-1c
Intersection with priority over merging on the right

P-1d
Intersection with priority over merge from the left

P-1e
Section with shortcuts

P-2
Intersection with right priority

P-3
Traffic lights

P-4
Roundabout

P-5
Opening bridge

P-6
Tram crossing

P-7
Level crossing with barriers

P-8
Level crossing without barriers

P-9a
Proximity of a level crossing or a moving bridge (right side)

P-9b
Approach of a level crossing or a moving bridge (right side)

P-9c
Proximity of a level crossing or a moving bridge (right side)

P-10a
Proximity of a level crossing or a moving bridge (left side)

P-10b
Approach of a level crossing or a moving bridge (left side)

P-10c
Proximity of a level crossing or a moving bridge (left side)

P-11
Level crossing (single track)

P-11a
Level crossing (Two or more railroad tracks)

P-12
Low-flying craft

P-13a
Dangerous curve to the right

P-13b
Dangerous curve to the left

P-14a
Dangerous curves, first to the right

P-14b
Dangerous curves, first to the left

P-15
Uneven road

P-15a
Speed bump

P-15b
Dip

P-16a
Steep descent

P-16b
Steep ascent

P-17
Road narrows on both sides

P-17a
Road narrows on the right

P-17b
Road narrows on the left

P-18
Roadworks

P-19
Slippery road

P-20a
Pedestrians

P-20b
Pedestrian crossing

P-20c
Pedestrian and cyclists crossing

P-21a
Children

P-21b
Elderly pedestrians

P-22a
Cyclists crossing

P-22b
Cyclists

P-23
Cattle or livestock

P-24
Deer or wild animals

P-24a
Wild boars

P-25
Two-way traffic

P-26
Falling rocks

P-27
Unprotected body of water

P-28
Loose surface material

P-29
Crosswind

P-30
Soft or low verges

P-31
Traffic queues

P-32
Accident

P-33
Reduced visibility

P-34
Pavement slippery due to ice or snow

P-35
Braided crossing

P-50
Other dangers

== Regulatory signs ==
=== Priority signs ===
Priority signs force other vehicles to give way in various situations. Due to their importance, these signs have different shapes from all the others. The Stop sign (R-2) is octagonal in shape and is red. The Yield sign (R-1) is shaped like an equilateral triangle with one vertex facing downwards and is white with a red border.

R-1
Give way

R-2
Stop

R-3
Priority road

R-4
End of priority road

R-5
Give way to oncoming traffic

R-6
Priority over oncoming traffic

=== Entry prohibition signs ===
Prohibition signs prohibit behavior that may cause danger. These signs have a circular shape and their pictogram is black on a white background, edges and band (descending transversal from left to right crossing the pictogram at 45° with respect to the horizontal) red (the red must cover, at least, 35 percent of the sign surface).

No entry signs are those that restrict access to a road. These signs are circular and white with a red border. Due to its importance, the "no entry" sign (R-101) has a red background with a white stripe.

R-100
No vehicles

R-101
No entry

R-102
No motor vehicles

R-103
No motor vehicles, except two-wheeled motorcycles

R-104
No motorcycles

R-105
No mopeds (and vehicles for people with reduced mobility)

R-106
No vehicles intended for the transport of goods

R-107
No heavy goods vehicles with a mass greater than indicated in the sign

R-108
No vehicles carrying dangerous goods

R-109
No vehicles transporting explosive or flammable goods

R-110
No vehicles transporting water polluting products (more than 1,000 liters)

R-111
No agricultural motor vehicles

R-112
No motor vehicles with a trailer, other than a semi-trailer or a single-axle trailer

R-113
No animal-drawn vehicles

R-114
No bicycles

R-115
No handcarts

R-116
No pedestrians

R-117
No mounted animals

R-118
No personal mobility devices

R-119
No personal mobility devices and bicycles

R-120
Vehicles restricted to specified low emission vehicles

=== Restriction signs ===
R-200
Passing without stopping prohibited

R-200
Toll

R-201
Mass limitation

R-202
Mass limitation per axle

R-203
Length limitation

R-204
Width limitation

R-205
Height limitation

=== Other prohibition or restriction signs ===
R-300
Minimum separation

R-301
Maximum speed limit (10 km/h)

R-301
Maximum speed limit (20 km/h)

R-301
Maximum speed limit (25 km/h)

R-301
Maximum speed limit (30 km/h)

R-301
Maximum speed limit (40 km/h)

R-301
Maximum speed limit (50 km/h)

R-301
Maximum speed limit (60 km/h)

R-301
Maximum speed limit (70 km/h)

R-301
Maximum speed limit (80 km/h)

R-301
Maximum speed limit (90 km/h)

R-301
Maximum speed limit (100 km/h)

R-301
Maximum speed limit (110 km/h)

R-301
Maximum speed limit (120 km/h)

R-302
No right turn

R-303
No left turn

R-304
No U-turn

R-305
No overtaking

R-306
No overtaking by heavy goods vehicles

R-307
No stopping and parking

R-307a
No stopping and parking (both sides)

R-307b
No stopping and parking (only right)

R-307c
No stopping and parking (only left)

R-308
Parking prohibited

R-308c
Alternate parking (no parking from days 1 to 15)

R-308d
Alternate parking (no parking from days 16 to 31)

R-308e
No parking on driveway

R-308f
No parking (both sides)

R-308g
No parking (only right)

R-308h
No parking (only left)

R-309
Restricted parking zone

R-310
No honking

=== Mandatory signs ===
R-400a
Turn right

R-400b
Turn left

R-400c
Go straight

R-400d
Turn right

R-400e
Turn left

R-401a
Keep right

R-401b
Keep left

R-401c
May pass on either side

R-402
Roundabout

R-403a
Go straight or turn right

R-403b
Go straight or turn left

R-403c
Turn right or left

R-404
Road for cars

R-405
Road for motorcycles without sidecar

R-406
Road for trucks and vans

R-407a
Road for cyclists

R-407b
Road for mopeds (and vehicles for people with reduced mobility)

R-408
Road for animal-drawn vehicles

R-409
Road for mounted animals

R-410
Road for pedestrians

R-411
Minimum speed limit

R-412a
Snow chains mandatory

R-412b
Winter tires

R-413
Headlamps

R-414
Road for vehicles carrying dangerous goods

R-415
Road for vehicles carrying water pollutants

R-416
Road for vehicles carrying explosives

R-417
Mandatory use of seat belts

R-418
Exclusive lane for vehicles equipped with operational electronic tolling equipment. Mandatory electronic toll

R-419
Road for tractors

R-420
Road for personal mobility devices

R-421
Road for personal mobility devices and bicycles

R-422
Dismount and continue on foot

=== De-restriction signs ===
De-restriction signs inform that the prohibition or limitation section has ended. These signs are round and white with one or more diagonal black lines (one in France, three in the Netherlands, five in Spain and Germany).

R-500
End of all previously signed restrictions

R-501
End of speed limit

R-502
End of no overtaking

R-503
End of no overtaking for trucks

R-504
End of limited parking zone

R-505
End of road for bicycles

R-506
End of minimum speed limit

R-507
End of road for cars

R-508
End of road for motorcycles without sidecar

R-509
End of road for trucks and vans

R-510
End of road for mopeds

R-511
End of road for animal-drawn vehicles

R-512
End of road for horses

R-513
End of road for pedestrians

R-514
End of road for tractors

R-515
End of road for personal mobility devices

R-516
End of road for personal mobility devices and bicycles

== Indication signs ==
Indication signs inform the driver about something of interest. These signs are square or rectangular, blue with white elements and border. The signs are listed below along with their reference and corresponding legend as described in the General Traffic Regulations (Reglamento General de la Circulación).

=== General indication signs ===
S-1
Motorway

S-1a
Dual carriageway

S-1b
Multi-lane

S-1c
Road 2+1

S-2
End of motorway

S-2a
End of dual carriageway

S-2b
End of multi-lane

S-2c
End of road 2+1

S-3
Limited-access highway

S-4
End of limited-access highway

S-5
Tunnel

S-7
Recommended maximum speed

S-8
End of recommended maximum speed

S-9
Recommended speed range

S-10
End of recommended speed range

S-11
One-way road

S-11a
One-way road (two lanes)

S-11b
One-way road (three lanes)

S-12
Section of one-way road

S-13
Pedestrian crossing

S-14a
Pedestrian overpass

S-14b
Pedestrian underpass

S-14c
Pedestrian ramp

S-14d
Pedestrian ramp

S-14e
Cyclist overpass

S-14f
Cyclist underpass

S-15a
Dead end

S-15b
Dead end

S-15c
Dead end

S-15d
Dead end

S-15e
Dead end, except for pedestrians and bicycles

S-16
Emergency braking zone

S-17
Parking

S-18
Reserved place for taxis

S-19
Bus stop

S-20
Tram stop

S-21
Transitability on a section or mountain road

S-22
Distance to a place which permits U-turns

S-23
Hospital

S-24
End of short-range headlamps obligation

S-25
Change of direction at different level

S-26a
Countdown beacon (300 m)

S-26b
Countdown beacon (200 m)

S-26c
Countdown beacon (100 m)

S-27
Roadside assistance

S-28
Residential area

S-29
End of residential area

S-30
Pedestrian zone

S-31
End of pedestrian zone

S-32
Electronic toll

S-33
Cycle path

S-34
Siding in roads

S-34a
Siding in tunnels (SOS)

S-35
Path reserved for bicycles

S-36
End of path reserved for bicycles

S-37
Path reserved for personal mobility devices

S-38
Path reserved for bicycles and personal mobility devices

S-39
End of path reserved for personal mobility devices

S-40
End of path reserved for bicycles and personal mobility devices

S-41
Path for pedestrians and bicycles

S-42
End of path for pedestrians and bicycles

S-43
Path for pedestrians, bicycles and personal mobility devices

S-44
End of path for pedestrians, bicycles and personal mobility devices

S-45
Cyclist crossing

S-46
Crossing for bicycles and pedestrians

S-47
Shared area

S-48
End of shared area

S-49
Advanced stop for bicycles and motorcycles

=== Lane signs ===
Lane signs indicate the purpose of the lanes or the passage from one to several, etc.

S-50a
Lanes reserved according to speed signposted

S-50b
Lanes reserved according to speed signposted

S-50c
Lanes reserved according to speed signposted

S-50d
Lanes reserved according to speed signposted

S-50e
Lanes reserved according to speed signposted

S-51a
Lane reserved for specific types of vehicles

S-51b
High-occupancy vehicle (HOV) lane

S-52
End of lane intended for traffic

S-52a
End of lane intended for traffic

S-52b
End of lane intended for traffic

S-52c
End of lane intended for traffic

S-52d
End of lane intended for traffic

S-52e
End of lane intended for traffic

S-52f
End of lane intended for traffic

S-52g
End of lane intended for traffic

S-53
Transition from one to two traffic lanes

S-53a
Transition from one to two traffic lanes with maximum speed specification for each lane

S-53b
Transition from two to three traffic lanes

S-53c
Transition from two to three traffic lanes with maximum speed specification for each lane

S-60a
Left turn on a two-lane roadway

S-60b
Right turn on a two-lane roadway

S-61a
Left turn on a three-lane roadway

S-61b
Right turn on a three-lane roadway

S-61c
Right turn onto a road with two lanes in the direction of travel and one lane in the opposite direction

S-62a
Left turn on a four-lane roadway

S-62b
Right turn on a four-lane roadway

S-63
Fork in a four-lane roadway

S-63b
Fork in a three-lane roadway

S-63c
Two-lane fork to the left on a four-lane roadway

S-63d
Two-lane fork to the right on a four-lane roadway

S-64a
Mandatory cycle lane attached to a one-way roadway

S-64b
Mandatory cycle lane adjacent to a two-way roadway

S-65a
Cycle lane attached to a one-way roadway

S-65b
Cycle lane adjacent to a two-way roadway

S-66
Contraflow bike lane

S-68
Section of roadway with one lane for the direction of travel and two lanes for the opposite direction

S-70a
Confluence of a left-hand lane on a single-lane roadway

S-70b
Confluence of a right-hand lane on a single-lane roadway

S-71a
Confluence of a left-hand lane on a two-lane roadway

S-71b
Confluence of a right-hand lane on a two-lane roadway

S-72a
Confluence of a left-hand lane on a three-lane roadway

S-72b
Confluence of a right-hand lane on a three-lane roadway

S-73a
Confluence of two lanes on the left in a two-lane roadway

S-73b
Confluence of two lanes on the right in a two-lane roadway

=== Service signs ===
Service signs indicate the location of a roadside service.

S-100
Aid station

S-101
Ambulance base

S-102
Vehicle technical inspection service

S-103
Repair shop

S-104
Phone

S-105
Fuel pump

S-105b
Fuel and LPG pump

S-105c
LPG pump

S-105d
Fuel pump and electric vehicle charging station

S-105e
Vehicle charging station

S-105f
Fuel pump, LPG and electric charging station

S-106
Repair shop and fuel pump

S-107
Camping

S-108
Water

S-109
Picturesque place

S-110
Hotel or motel

S-111
Restaurant

S-112
Café

S-113
Land for trailers/homes

S-114
Picnic area

S-115
Starting point for walking excursions

S-116
Campsite and land for trailer homes

S-117
Youth hostel

S-118
Tourist information

S-119
Fishing reserve

S-120
Park or natural space

S-121
Monument

S-122
Other services

S-123
Rest area

S-124
Parking for railway users

S-125
Parking for metro users

S-126
Parking for bus users

S-128
Caravan and motorhome emptying point

S-129
Emergency parking due to snow

=== Orientation signs ===
==== Pre-signaling signs ====
The signs indicate the location of an intersection at an adequate distance for it to be effective, being a minimum of 500 m on highways and highways, and can be reduced to 50 m in towns and repeated several times at another distance. Sometimes they can be seen in different colors to differentiate them.

S-200
Roundabout pre-signaling

S-201
Advance signage for a split roundabout from the main roadway

S-202
Advance warning of a split roundabout from the secondary roadways

S-203
Roundabout pre-signaling with lane selection based on the intended movement

S-220
Pre-signaling of directions to a conventional road

S-222
Pre-signaling of directions to a highway or highway

S-222a
Pre-signaling of directions to a highway or dual carriageway and own direction

S-225
Pre-signaling of directions on a highway or dual carriageway to any road

S-230
Pre-signaling with signs on the carriageway on a conventional road towards a conventional road

S-230a
Pre-signaling with signs on the carriageway on a conventional road towards a conventional road and its own direction

S-232
Pre-signaling with signs on the carriageway on a conventional road towards a highway or dual carriageway

S-232a
Pre-signaling with signs on the carriageway on a conventional road towards a highway or dual carriageway and its own direction

S-235
Pre-signaling with signs on the highway or dual carriageway to any road

S-235a
Pre-signaling with signs on the highway or dual carriageway road towards any road and its own direction

S-242
Pre-signaling on the highway or dual carriageway of two exits very close to any road.

S-242a
Pre-signaling on the highway or dual carriageway of two exits very close to any road and its own direction

S-250
Route pre-signaling

S-261
Pre-signaling on conventional roads of service zone or area

S-261
Pre-signaling on conventional roads of service zone or area

S-263
Pre-signaling on the highway or dual carriageway of an area or service area with shared exit

S-263
Pre-signaling on the highway or dual carriageway of an area or service area with exclusive exit

S-264
Pre-signaling on a conventional road for a service road

S-264
Pre-signaling on a conventional road for a service road

S-266
Pre-signaling on a highway or dual carriageway of a service road, with a shared exit

S-266
Pre-signaling on a highway or dual carriageway of a service road, with a shared exit

S-266a
Pre-signaling on a highway or dual carriageway of a service road, with an exclusive exit

S-271
Service area pre-signaling

==== Direction signs ====
S-300
Towns on a conventional road route

S-301
Towns on a highway or dual carriageway route

S-310
Towns on various routes

S-320
Places of interest by conventional road

S-321
Places of interest by highway or dual carriageway

S-322
Destination sign towards a cycle route or cycle path

S-341
Immediate exit destination signs towards conventional highway

S-342
Destination signs for immediate exit to the highway or dual carriageway

S-344
Destination signs for immediate exit to a zone, area or service road

S-347
Destination signs for immediate exit to a zone, area or service road, with shared exit to a highway or dual carriageway

S-348
Detour destination sign

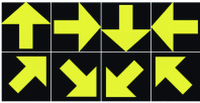
S-348b
Variable destination signal

S-350
Sign on the road, in conventional road. Immediate departure to conventional road

S-351
Sign on the highway and highway road. Immediate departure to conventional road

S-354
Sign on the road, in conventional road. Immediate exit to the highway or dual carriageway

S-355
Sign on the road, on the highway, highway and expressway. Immediate exit to highway or dual carriageway

S-360
Signs on the road on conventional roads. Immediate exit to conventional road and own direction

S-362
Signs on the road on conventional roads. Immediate exit to the highway or dual carriageway and own direction

S-366
Signs on the highway or dual carriageway road. Immediate exit to conventional road and own direction

S-368
Signs on the highway or dual carriageway road. Exit to the highway or highway and own direction

S-373
Signs on the highway or dual carriageway road. Two immediate exits very close to a conventional highway and its own direction

S-375
Signs on the highway or dual carriageway road. Two immediate exits very close to the highway or highway and own direction

==== Route number signs ====
Route number signs are intended to identify the roads by their number, made up of figures, letters or a combination of both, or by their name. They are made up of this number or this name framed in a rectangle or a shield.

S-400
European route

S-410
Highway or dual carriageway route

S-410
Highway or dual carriageway route

S-410
Highway or dual carriageway route

S-410a
Toll road

S-420
State general network road

S-430
First level autonomous highway

S-440
Second level autonomous highway

S-450
Third level autonomous highway

==== Location signs ====
Location signs are used to indicate:

- The border between two regions;
- The limit between two administrative divisions of the same region;
- The name of a town, a river, a port, a place or other circumstance of an analogous nature.
S-500
Entrance to town

S-510
Exit from town

S-520
Location of characteristic point of the road

S-540
Entrance to province

S-550
Entrance to autonomous community

S-551
Hydrographic demarcation boundary

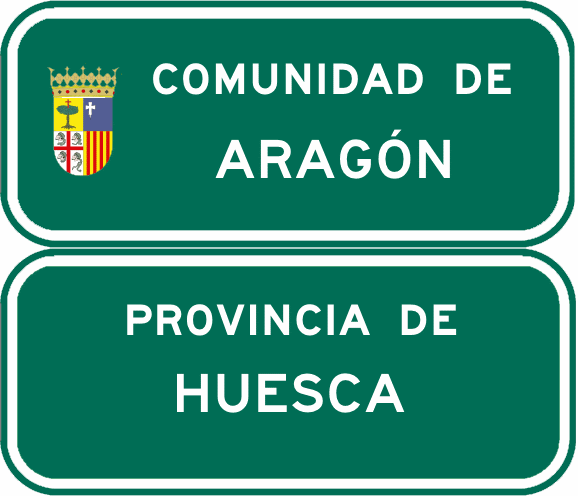
S-560
Entrance to autonomous community

S-570
Kilometer marker on highway and dual carriageway

S-570a
Kilometer marker on toll highway

S-571
Kilometer marker on the highway and dual carriageway that is also part of a European route

S-572
Kilometer marker on conventional road

S-573
Kilometer marker on a conventional road that is also part of a European route

S-574
Miriametric marker on a conventional road

S-574a
Miriametric marker on a highway or dual carriageway

S-574b
Miriametric marker on toll highway

S-574c
Miriametric marker on a conventional road that is also part of a European route

S-574d
Miriametric marker on highway and dual carriageway that is also part of a European routey

S-574e
Miriametric marker on toll highway that is also part of a European route

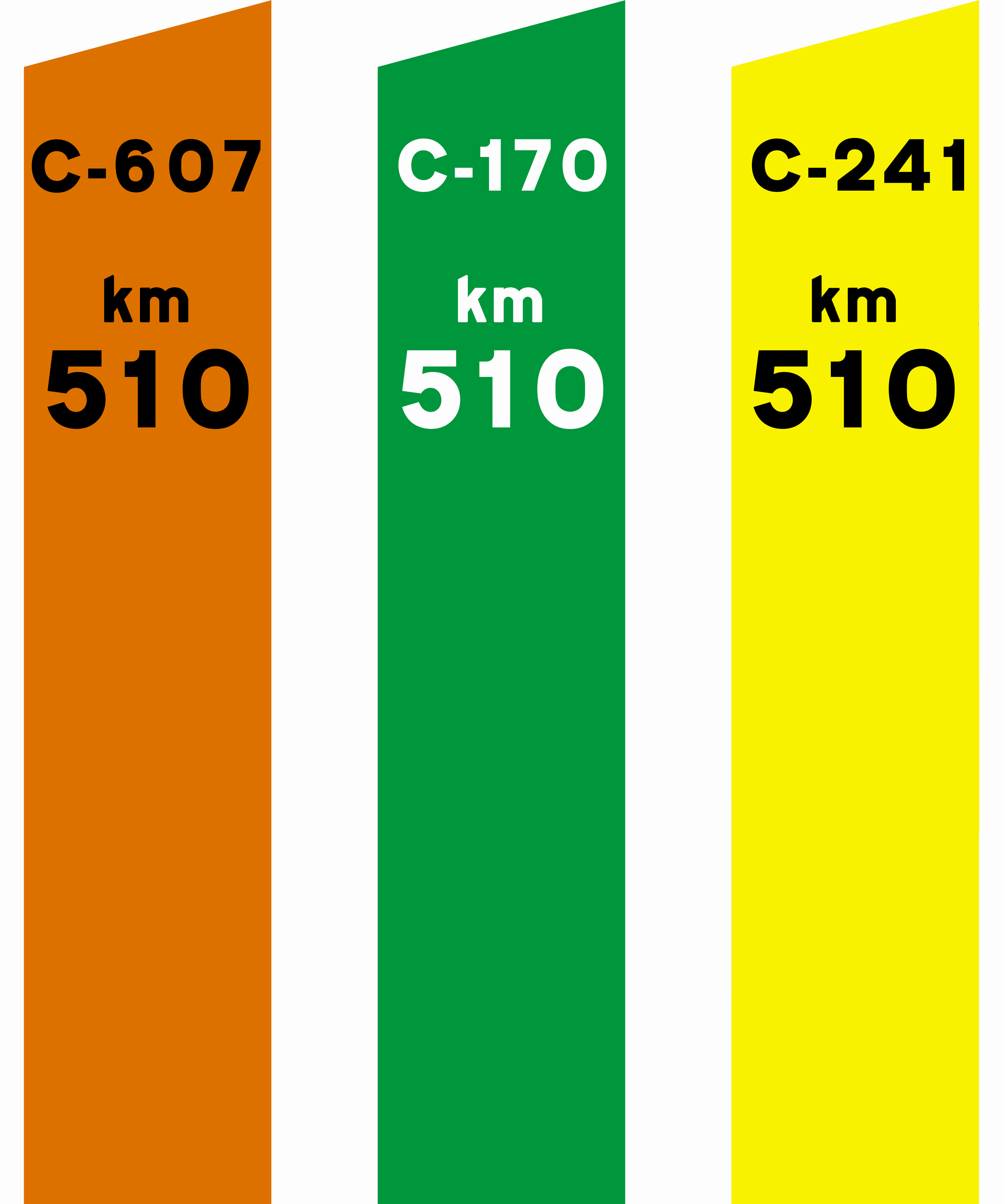
S-575
Miriametric marker

==== Confirmation signs ====
S-600
Confirmation of towns on a conventional road route

S-602
Confirmation of towns on a highway or dual carriageway

==== Signs for specific use in the town ====
S-700
Places on the urban road network

S-710
Places of interest for travelers

S-720
Places of sporting or recreational interest

S-730
Places of geographical or ecological nature

S-740
Places of monumental or cultural interest

S-750
Industrial use areas

S-760
Highways and dual carriageways

S-770
Other places and routes

=== Additional panels ===
S-800
Distance to the beginning of the danger or prescription

S-810
Length of the dangerous section or subject to prescription

S-820
Extension of the ban, to the right

S-821
Extension of the ban, to the left

S-830
Extension of the ban, on both sides

S-840
STOP presignaling

S-850
Direction of priority road

S-851
Direction of priority road

S-852
Direction of priority road

S-853
Direction of priority road

S-860a
Generic

S-860b
Except...

S-870a
Signage application (right)

S-870b
Signage application (left)

S-880a
Signaling application to trucks

S-880b
Signaling application to vehicles with trailers except those with a single axle

S-880c
Signaling application to buses

S-880d
Signaling application to cycles

S-880e
Signaling application to electric scooters

S-880f
Signaling application to cycles and electric scooters

S-890a
Signaling application in certain conditions (snow)

S-890b
Signaling application in certain conditions (rain)

S-890c
Signaling application in certain conditions (fog)

S-891
Minimum distance for overtaking cyclists

S-892
Video surveillance area

=== Other signs ===
S-900
Fire danger

S-910
Extinguisher

S-920
Entry to Spain

S-930
Country confirmation

S-940
General speed limit in Spain

S-950
Radio frequency of specific road information stations

S-960
Emergency phone

S-970
Fire extinguisher location and emergency phone

S-980
Emergency exit

S-990
Indicative arrow sign emergency sign in tunnels

== Construction signs ==
The construction traffic signs in Spain are signs, generally similar to the rest, with a yellow background used to signal detours or temporary changes due to works on the road.

The different works signs are listed below, accompanied by their reference and a legend. Temporary signs shown below differ from permanent ones in that they have a yellow background instead of white.

=== Warning signs ===
TP-1
Intersection with priority

TP-1a
Intersection with priority on the road on the right

TP-1b
Intersection with priority on the road on the left

TP-1c
Intersection with priority over incorporation from the right

TP-1d
Intersection with priority over incorporation from the left

TP-2
Intersection with right priority

TP-3
Traffic lights

TP-4
Intersection with rotary circulation

TP-13a
Dangerous curve to the right

TP-13b
Dangerous curve to the left

TP-14a
Dangerous curves to the right

TP-14b
Dangerous curves to the left

TP-15
Uneven road

TP-15a
Bump

TP-15b
Dip

TP-17
Road narrows on both sides

TP-17a
Road narrows on the right

TP-17b
Road narrows on the left

TP-18
Roadworks

TP-19
Slippery road

TP-25
Traffic in both directions

TP-26
Detachment

TP-28
Gravel projection

TP-30
Side step

TP-31
Congestion

TP-50
Other dangers

=== Regulation and priority signs ===
TR-1
Yield

TR-5
Give way to oncoming traffic

TR-6
Priority over oncoming traffic

TR-101
No entry

TR-106
No goods transport vehicles

TR-201
Weight limitation

TR-204
Width limitation

TR-205
Height limitation

TR-302
No right turn

TR-303
No left turn

TR-305
No overtaking

TR-306
No overtaking by heavy goods vehicles

TR-308
No parking

TR-400a
Turn right

TR-400b
Turn left

TR-401a
Keep right

TR-401b
Keep left

=== Speed limit signs ===
TR-301-20
Speed limit (20 km/h)

TR-301-30
Speed limit (30 km/h)

TR-301-40
Speed limit (40 km/h)

TR-301-50
Speed limit (50 km/h)

TR-301-60
Speed limit (60 km/h)

TR-301-70
Speed limit (70 km/h)

TR-301-80
Speed limit (80 km/h)

TR-301-90
Speed limit (90 km/h)

TR-301-100
Speed limit (100 km/h)

=== De-restriction signs ===
TR-500
End of all previously signed restrictions

TR-501
End of speed limit

TR-502
End of overtaking prohibition

TR-503
End of overtaking by trucks prohibition

=== Indication signs ===
TS-52
Convergence of a lane on the right (from 3 to 2)

TS-53
Convergence of one lane on the left (from 3 to 2)

TS-54
Convergence of one lane on the right (from 2 to 1)

TS-55
Convergence of one lane on the left (from 2 to 1)

TS-60
Detour of one lane onto the opposite road

TS-61
Detour of one lane onto the opposite road, keeping another on the construction road

TS-62
Detour of two lanes on the opposite road

TS-210
Sketch of detour at work

TS-210
Sketch of detour at work

TS-220
Address pre-signaling

TS-800
Distance to the beginning of the danger or prescription

TS-810
Length of dangerous section or subject to prescription

=== Reflective marking signs ===
TB-1
Wide directional panel

TB-2
Narrow directional panel

TB-3
Wide directional double panel

TB-4
Narrow double directional panel

TB-5
Excluded traffic zone panel

TB-6
Traffic cone

TB-7
Picket

TB-8
Right edge beacon

TB-9
Left edge beacon

TB-10
Captafaro

TB-11
Luminous and reflective beacon

TB-12
Provisional road marking

TB-13
Garland

TB-14
Mobile frame

== Unofficial signs ==
There are signs that can appear on many roads in Spain, but are not officially included in the Traffic Manual.

=== General danger and regulatory signs ===
Steep ascent for bicycles

No four or more road users

Minimum safe distance between cars and bicycles

=== Indication signs ===
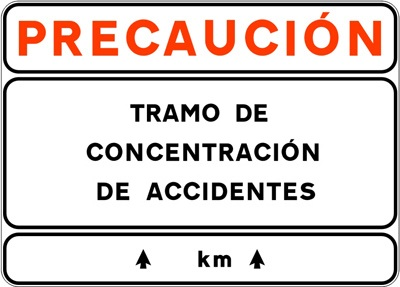
Sign indicating the beginning of a section of concentration of accidents

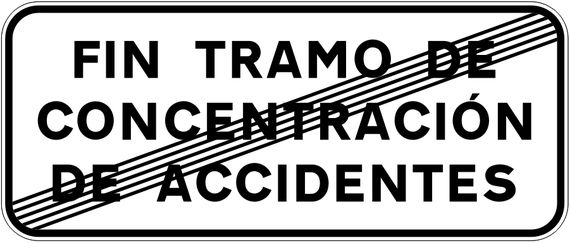
Sign indicating the end of a section of concentration of accidents

Recommended speed in rain (yellow background)

Toll booth clearance for cars

Historical Road direction

Experimental signage with feedback link

Section radar with green solid line road markings

Rest area, custom AP-68 model

== Historic signs ==
=== 1939 road signs ===
Uneven road

Series of bends

Crossroad

Level crossing with barriers

Level crossing without barriers

Danger

Danger

Yield

No vehicles

No entry

No motor vehicles except motorcycles

No motorcycles

No motor vehicles

Weight limit

Motor vehicle weight limit

Speed limit

Height limit

Width limit

No stopping

No parking

Mandatory direction

Customs

Parking

Caution

First aid

=== 1958 road signs ===
==== Warning signs ====
Uneven road

Series of bends

Right curve

Left curve

Double right curve

Double left curve

Crossroad

Railway crossing with gates

Railway crossing without gates

Countdown beacon

Countdown beacon

Countdown beacon

Countdown beacon

Dangerous hill

Road narrows

Opening bridge

Roadworks

Slippery road

Pedestrian crossing

Children

Animals

Crossroad with priority

Two-way traffic

Danger

Yield

==== Prohibitory signs ====
No vehicles

No entry

No right turn

No left turn

No overtaking

No overtaking for trucks

No motor vehicles with more than three wheels

No motorcycles

No motor vehicles

No trucks

No cycles

Width limit

Height limit

Weight limit

Axle load limit

Speed limit

End of speed limit

Stop

No parking

No honking

Yield to oncoming traffic

==== Mandatory signs ====
Turn left

Turn right

Go straight

Roundabout

Bicycle path

Motor vehicles only

Minimum speed limit

==== Information signs ====
Parking

Hospital

First aid or hospital

Repair service

Telephone

Filling station

Priority road

End of priority road

Priority over oncoming traffic

=== 1962 road signs ===
==== Warning signs ====
A-2
Intersection with priority

A-3
Intersection with right priority

A-4
Traffic signals

A-5
Roundabout

A-6
Level crossing with barriers

A-7
Level crossing without barriers

A-8
Low-flying craft

A-10a
Dangerous curve to the right

A-10b
Dangerous curve to the left

A-11a
Dangerous curves, first to the right

A-11b
Dangerous curves, first to the left

A-13
Steep descent

A-14
Road narrows

A-16
Roadworks

A-17
Slippery road

A-18
Pedestrian crossing

A-19
Children

A-20
Cattle or livestock

A-21
Deer or wild animals

A-50
Other dangers

==== Regulatory signs ====
B-200
No vehicles

B-210
No motor vehicles, except motorcycles

B-211
No motorcycles

B-214
No bicycles

B-216
No horse riders

B-217
No pedestrians

B-218
Weight limit

B-230
Speed limit

R-231
No right turn

R-232
No left turn

R-233
No U-turn

B-234
No overtaking

B-234a
No overtaking by trucks

R-240
No honking

B-300
Stop

B-301
Give way

B-302
Customs

R-310
Give way to oncoming traffic

B-320
Turn left

B-320a
Keep right

B-320b
Keep left

B-320c
Proceed straight

B-321
Roundabout

B-330
Motor vehicles, except motorcycles only

B-331
Motorcycles only

B-334
Bicycles only

B-337
Pedestrians only

B-340
Minimum speed limit

B-434
End of overtaking prohibition

B-434a
End of overtaking by trucks prohibition

==== Information signs ====
C-503
Recommended speed limit

C-508
U-turn area on 300 meters

C-510
Parking

C-511
Taxis

C-512
Hospital

C-602
Telephone

C-604
Petrol station

C-605
Breakdown service and petrol station

C-609
Traffic camera

C-610
Hotel/Restaurant

C-650
Accommodation

C-651
Fishing

C-652
National park

C-701
Towns on a conventional road route

C-801
Entrance to town (through a national road)

C-802
Entrance to town (through a autonomous community road)

C-901
Warning of fire

C-902
Mass schedule

C-931
National monument

=== 1981 road signs ===
P-26 (I.25)
Falling rocks

P-28 (I.26)
Loose chippings

P-30 (I.28)
Soft verges

R-109 (II.A.22)
No vehicles carrying explosives

R-410 (II.B.11)
Pedestrians only

S-13 (III.A.18)
Pedestrian crossing

=== 1985 road signs ===
R-502
End of overtaking prohibition

R-503
End of overtaking by trucks prohibition

== Pictograms ==
The pictograms that appear in the official legislation are mostly used to personalize destinations on service signs, (Note: Such as the sign S-122.) direction signs (Note: Such as signs S-261, S-263, S-267, S-268, S-271, S-320, S-321, S-344, S-347, S-376, S-377, S-378, S-379 and S-380. Most direction signs that do not include a pictogram in their base design generally allow for one to be added.) and location signs. (Note: Such as signs S-530, S-531, S-700, S-710, S-720, S-730, S-740, S-750, S-760 and S-770.)

Motorway

Limited access dual carriageway

Multi-lane road

2+1 road

Road with shoulder

Road without shoulder

Built-up area

Exit to the right

Exit to the left

Mandatory direction of travel

Filling station

LPG filling station

Petrol and LPG filling station

Electric vehicle charging station

Petrol station and electric vehicle charging station

Petrol, electric vehicle charging and LPG filling station

Restaurant

Bar or café

Hotel or motel

Hospital

Vehicle inspection station

Truck weigh station

Industrial area

Vehicle repair workshop

Service area

Emergency snow parking

Truck parking area

Secure truck parking

Business park

Leisure area

Shopping area

Residential area

Marina

Town centre

Speed camera

Fire hose

Lay-by

Tunnel

Emergency exit

Emergency telephone

Fire extinguisher

Electronic toll collection available

Card payment

Electronic toll collection only

Ice or snow

Fog

Rain

Train

Bus

Airport

Port

Heliport

Airfield

Ferry

Ferry ticket sale

Airport departures

Airport arrivals

Truck

Bicycle

Cargo bicycle

Personal mobility vehicle

Motorcycle

Moped

Vehicles with trailer

Metro

Tram

Bus

Car rental

Car sharing

Car wash

Electric vehicle

Electric motorcycle and moped

Funicular

Cable car

Camping site

Caravan site

Motorhome service point

Motorhome

Youth hostel

Hostel

Rural accommodation

Pedestrian

Pedestrian area

Children's area

People with mobility impairments

Wheelchair access

Toilets

Tourist information

Spa

National monument

Museum

Castle

Crafts

Fishing industry

Cycle and pedestrian path

National park or natural area

Water

Panoramic viewpoint

Walking routes

Pilgrimage route

River

Boat landing

Picnic area

Fishing

Bridge or aqueduct

Beach

Fire hazard

Park

Mountain

Ski slope

Telephone

Post office

Pharmacy

First aid

Supermarket

Police

Library

University

Temple (Note: It can include a symbol representing the religion to which it is dedicated.)

Cemetery

Parking

Surveillance camera

Time restriction

Football stadium

Sports centre

Bullring

Theatre

Golf course

Planetarium

Amusement park

Zoo

Zoo

Racing circuit

== Derived systems ==
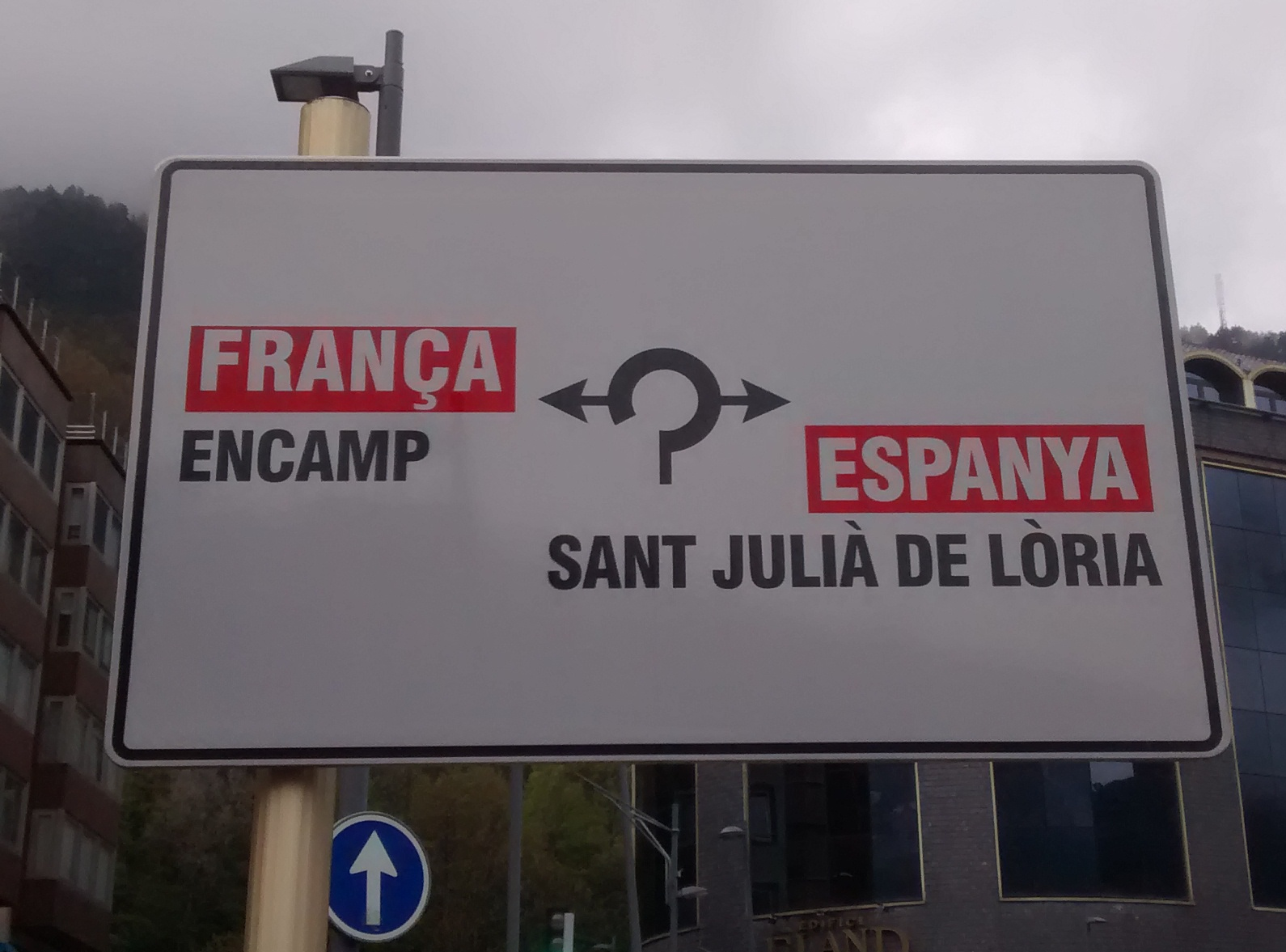
Roundabout sign in Andorra

- Road signs in Andorra make use of the same designs used in Spain for its road signs, though the Catalan language is used instead of Spanish. However, the system of Andorran direction signs differs significantly, with all such signs making use of the Swiss 721 Black Condensed typeface and being white in colour (and important destinations highlighted with a red background).
- Road signs in Equatorial Guinea largely shares the same road signage system used in Spain.
- Some road signs in Djibouti share the same road signage system used in Spain but they are written in French.
