= Road signs in Malta =

Riverbank warning road sign in Senglea.

Road signs in Malta are regulated by the Road Signs and Road Markings Regulations 1969, amended several times over the years, most recently in 2011, and are standardised by Transport Malta. Maltese road signs, also defined in The Highway Code of Malta, are based on those used in the United Kingdom, as the island nation was a British colony until 1964 when it became independent, with minor exceptions – for example, the use of the metric system to denote speed limits and distances. However, road signs using the Italian road sign design may be also found, some of which are "mirrored" to suit Malta's left-hand traffic configuration. There is therefore a coexistence of different signs on the British and, to a lesser extent, Italian model for the same function (even being used simultaneously). While not common, it is possible to encounter, again without any official nature, diamond-shaped warning signs similar to those used in Ireland.

Directional signs use the Transport typeface, and use elements borrowed predominantly from the British signage system.

Although Malta is not a signatory to the Vienna Convention on Road Signs and Signals, road signs generally conform to the pattern used by many other European countries.

== Gallery ==
=== Warning signs ===
Bend to the left
(also uses)

Bend to the right
(also uses)

Double bend, first to the left
(also uses)

Double bend, first to the right
(also uses)

Winding road

Crossroads without priority

Roundabout
(also uses)

Crossroads with priority
(also uses)

Junction with a minor side-road from right
(also uses)

Junction with a minor side-road from left
(also uses)

Offset side roads with priority, first to the left
(also uses)

Offset side roads with priority, first to the right
(also uses)

Low flying aircraft
(also uses)

Tunnel
(also uses)

Electricity warning
(also uses)

Other dangers
(also uses)

Tractors
(also uses)

Uneven road
(also uses)

Bump
(also uses)

Zebra crossing

School zone
(also uses)

Roadworks
(also uses)

Pedestrians
(also uses)

Elderly people crossing
(also uses)

Equestrians
(also uses)

Two-way traffic
(also uses)

Maximum height

Falling rocks
(also uses)

Traffic lights
(also uses)

=== Regulatory signs ===
No U-turn

No entry (One Way)

Closed to all vehicles

No motor vehicles (might use)

No animal-drawn vehicles

No bicycles

No motor vehicles except motorcycles without a sidecar

No trucks

No horse riding

No pedestrians

Maximum width

Maximum height

Maximum weight

Maximum speed

End of maximum speed

No overtaking

End of overtaking prohibition

No parking

No stopping

No use of horn or motor noise

End of horn prohibition

Give way
(also used)

Stop
(also used)

Give way to oncoming vehicles
(also used)

Minimum speed

End of minimum speed

Zebra crossing

Left turn only ahead
(also used)

Right turn only ahead
(also used)

Drive straight
(also used)

Turn left
(also used)

Turn right
(also used)

Roundabout
(also used)

Keep left
(also used)

Keep right
(also used)

Pass either side
(also used)

Drive straight or turn left

Drive straight or turn right

Right or left turn only ahead

=== Informational signs ===
Priority road

End of priority road

Priority over oncoming vehicles
(also used)

No through road
(also used)

No through road on left
(also used)

Parking
(also used)

Directions to parking

Hospital

Pre-signaling directions

Direction sign

Locality

Tourist direction sign

Tourist sign

Directions to parking

=== Additional panels ===
Distance

Stop ahead

School

Playground

Blind people

Disabled people
