= Road signs in Italy =

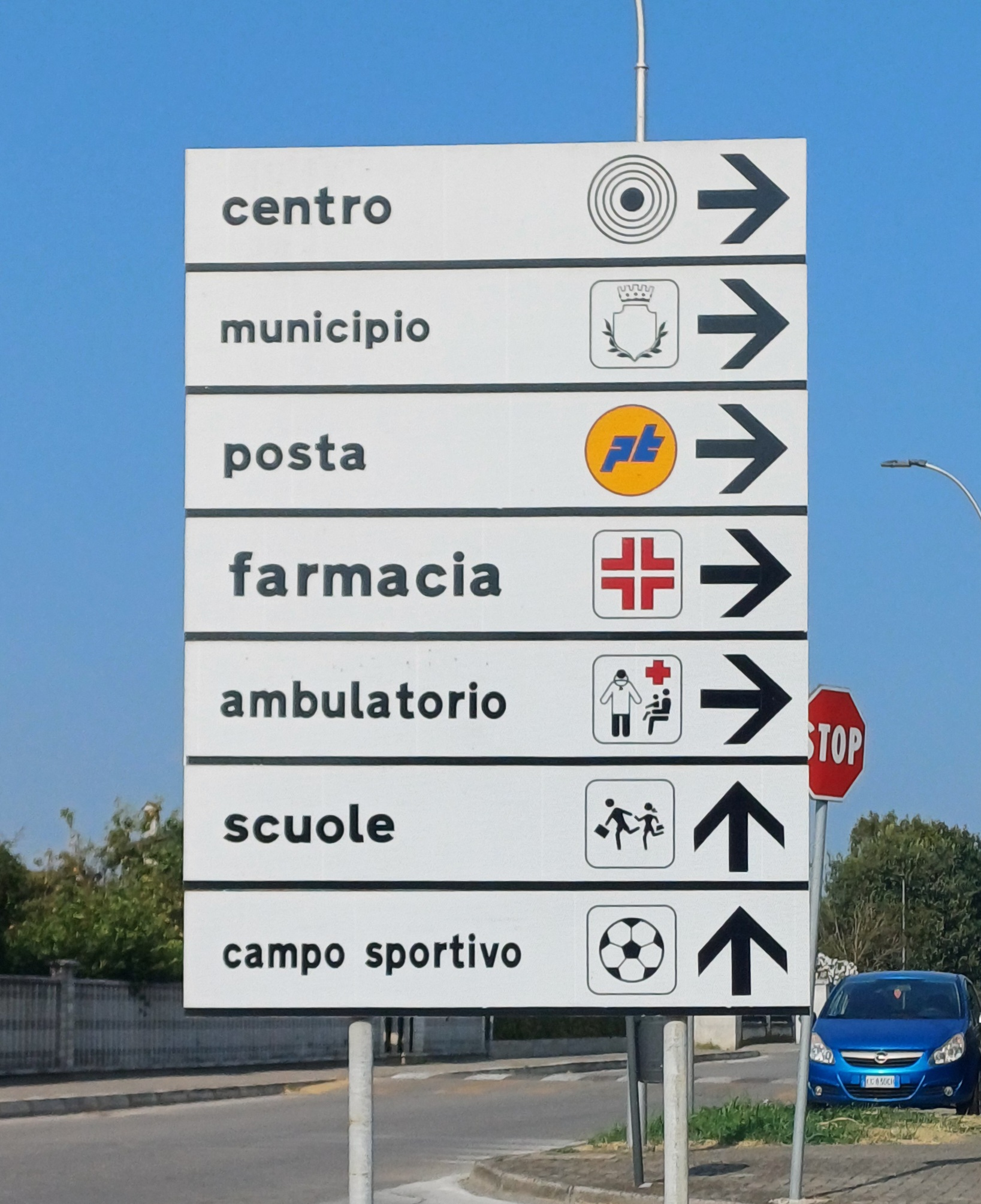
An example of a directional road sign in Italy.

Road signs in Italy conform to the general pattern of those used in most other European countries. They are regulated by the Codice della Strada (Road Code) and by the Regolamento di Attuazione del Codice della Strada (Rules for the Implementation of the Road Code) in conformity with the 1968 Vienna Convention on Road Signs and Signals.

Italy signed the Vienna Convention on Road Signs and Signals on November 8, 1968 and ratified it on February 7, 1997.

The modern traffic signs in Italy were first designed by Michele Arcangelo Iocca in 1959.

== Design ==
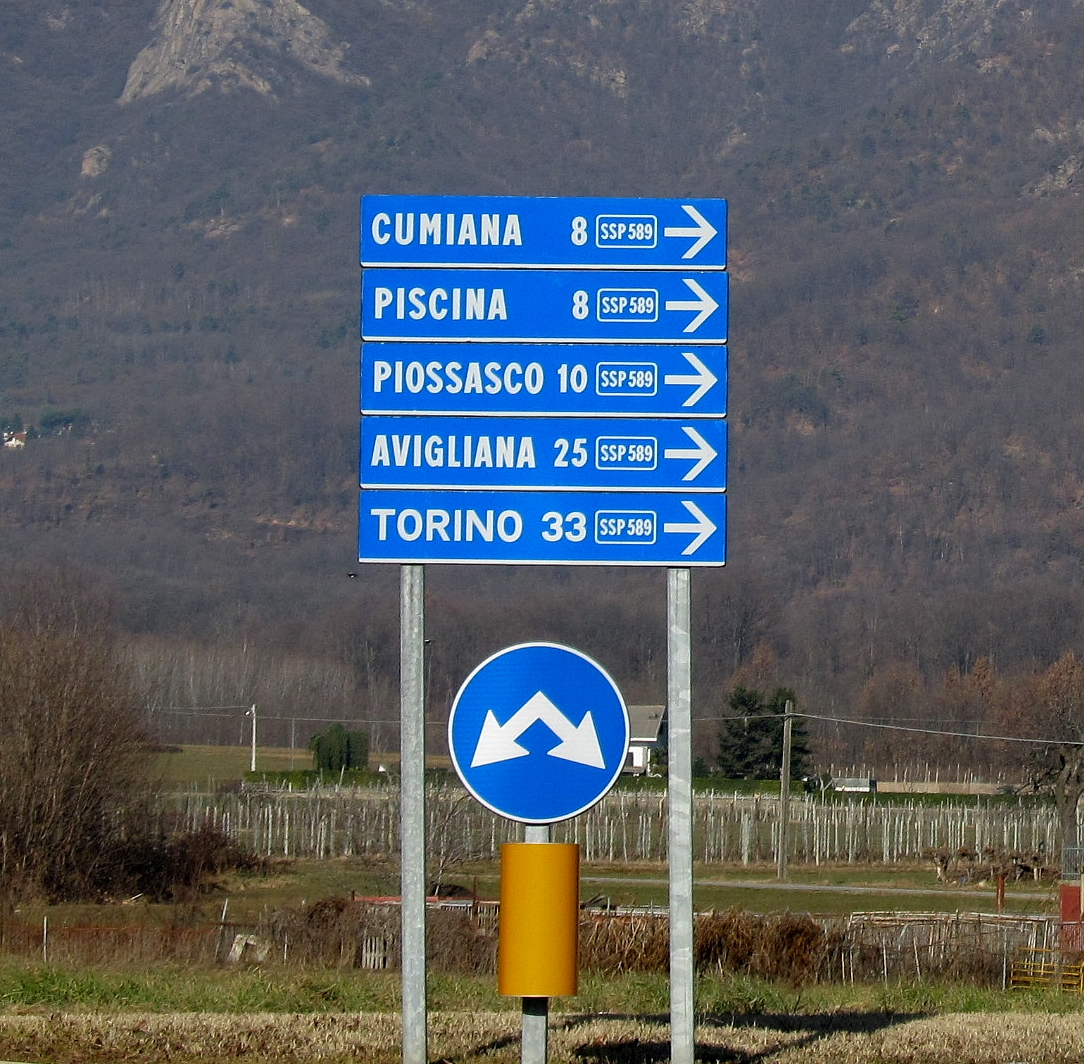
These signs are rectangular because they are placed on an urban area, and they are blue because they point to extra-urban itineraries

Distances and other measurements are displayed in metric units.

Warning signs are usually placed 150 metres before the area they're referring to; if they're farther or nearer, an additional sign displays the actual distance in metres. Prohibition signs and mandatory instruction signs, instead, are placed exactly at the beginning of the area of validity.

=== Colours and shapes ===
Signs follow the general European conventions concerning the use of shape and colour to indicate function of signs:

Type of sign	Shape	Border	Background colour
Warning	Triangular	Red	White
Prohibition	Circular	Red	White
Mandatory instructions	Circular	White	Blue
Supplementary	Rectangular	Black	White
Information	Rectangular (urban) and pointed (other roads)	White	White (urban); Blue (other roads); Green (motorway)

=== Colours of directional road signs ===
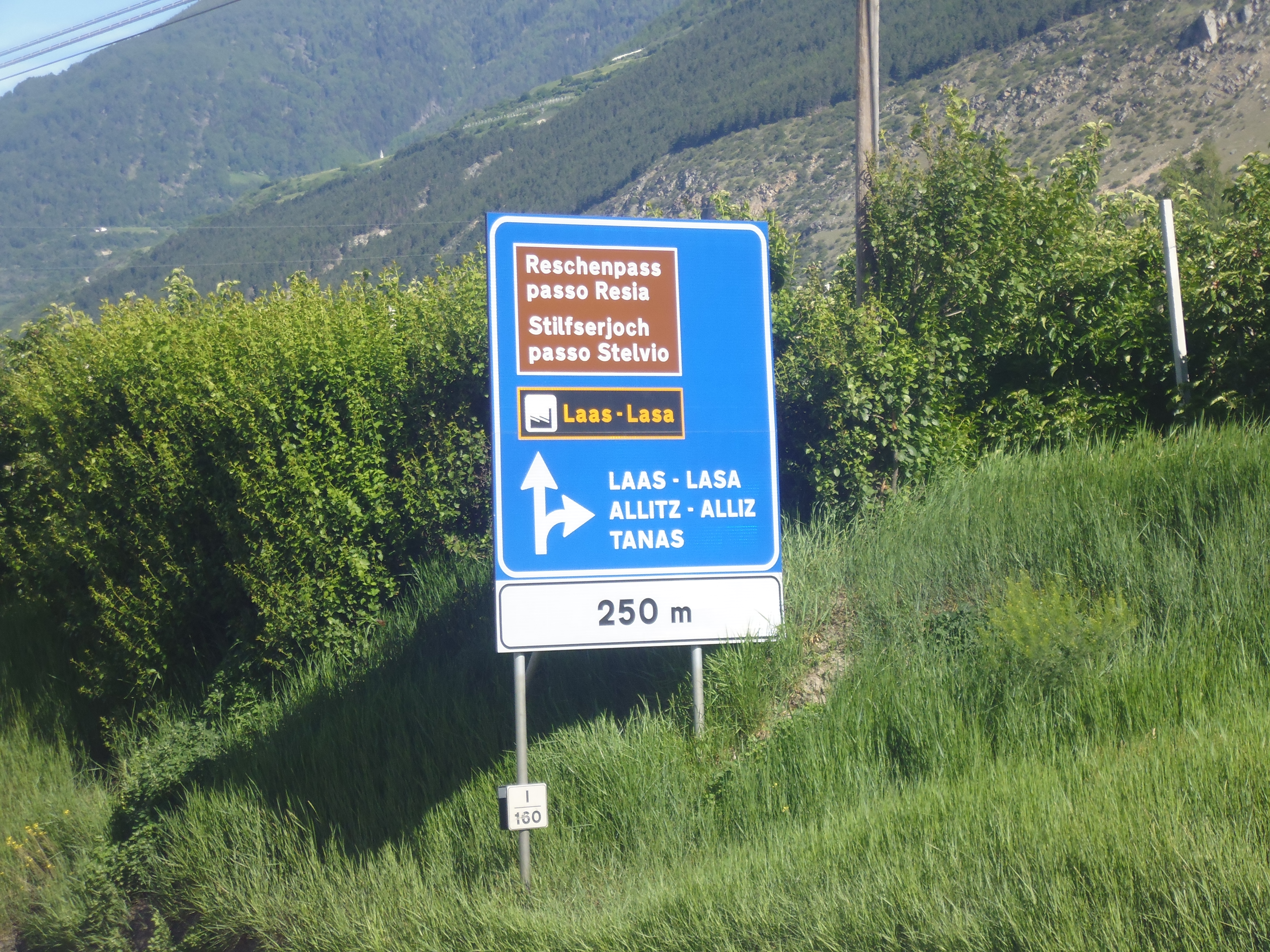
Example of directional road sign with multiple destinations. It is blue because it is on a main road outside a town (not a motorway). The indication to a geographical feature or a tourist attraction is in a brown box and the indication to an industrial zone is in a black and yellow box. The destinations are given in two languages.

- On motorways, directional signs are green with white lettering.
- On main roads, directional signs with more than one destination are blue with white lettering.
- Within cities, directional signs with more than one destination are white with black lettering.

On main roads and within cities, the colour of a directional sign with a single destination depends on the type of destination:

- if the destination is a city that is reached by means of a motorway, the sign is green and carries the motorway name as well as the destination
- in the other cases when the destination is a city, the sign is blue
- if the destination is a city district, a hospital or an airport, the sign is white
- if the destination is a geographical feature or a tourist attraction, the sign is brown

=== Typeface ===
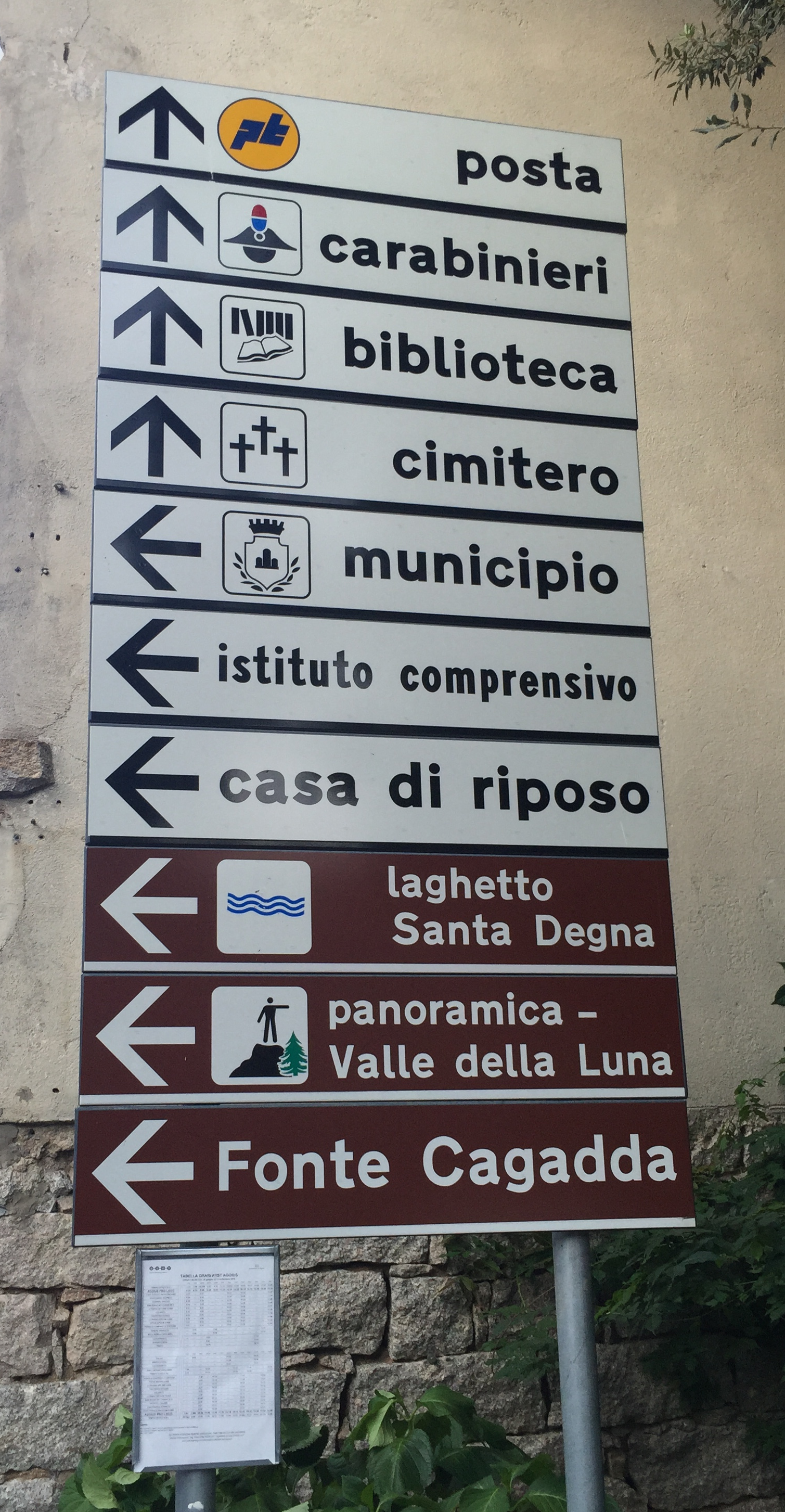
Example of a directional road sign, where "istituto comprensivo" is written in Alfabeto Stretto and the rest in Alfabeto Normale

A version of the Transport typeface employed on road signs in the UK, called Alfabeto Normale, is used on Italian road signs. A condensed version, called Alfabeto Stretto, is also used for long names that wouldn't fit. Each name uses one font, but names in Alfabeto Normale and in Alfabeto Stretto can co-exist on one sign.

The font is officially regulated by the 1992 Codice della Strada, article 39 section 125. It defines both Alfabeto Normale and Alfabeto Stretto for uppercase letters, lowercase letters and digits, "positive" (dark on light background) and "negative" (light on dark background). However, there are regulations about the use of Alfabeto Normale dating back to 1969.

Uppercase is used in most cases. Lowercase is sometimes used for city districts and tourist attractions.

=== Language ===
The standard language is Italian. In some autonomous regions or provinces bilingual signs are used (mainly Italian/German in South Tyrol, Italian/French in Aosta Valley and Italian/Slovenian along the Slovenian border, but also Italian/Friulan in the Friuli historical region and Italian/Sardinian in Sardinia).
These are some examples of the Italian sign "Passo carrabile" (No parking in front of vehicular access to the side properties) in the bilingual variants:

"Passo carrabile" sign in Italian

"Passo carrabile" sign in Italian and French (used in Aosta Valley)

"Passo carrabile" sign in Italian and German (used in South Tyrol)

"Passo carrabile" sign in Italian and Slovenian (used in some municipalities of Friuli-Venezia Giulia)

== Gallery ==
=== Warning signs ===
Uneven road
(formerly used that meant "Humps or dip")

Bumps in the road (formerly used that meant "Humps or ramp")

Dip (formerly used that meant "dangerous for dip")

Bend, to right
(formerly used)

Bend, to left
(formerly used)

Double bend, first to right
(formerly used)

Double bend, first to left
(formerly used)

Level crossing with barrier or gate ahead
(formerly used)

Level crossing without barrier or gate ahead
(formerly used)

Single Level crossing
(formerly used)

Multiple level crossing
(formerly used)

Trams crossing ahead

Pedestrian crossing ahead
(formerly used)

Pedestrian crossing ahead (with fluoro board)

Bicycle crossing ahead

Bicycle crossing ahead (with fluoro board)

Steep hill downwards
(formerly used)

Steep hill upwards

Road narrows
(formerly used)

Road narrows on the left

Road narrows on the right

Opening or swing bridge ahead
(formerly used)

Dangerous verges

Slippery road
(formerly used)

Children
(formerly used)

Children (with fluoro board)

Cattle
(formerly used)

Wild animals
(formerly used)

Two-way traffic
(formerly used)

Roundabout ahead

Quayside or river bank

Loose chippings

Falling rocks from left

Falling rocks from right

Traffic lights
(formerly used)

Horizontal traffic lights

Low-flying aircraft

Side winds

Risk of fire
(formerly used)

Other dangers
(formerly used)

Level crossing countdown marker (placed under the triangular warning sign, usually 150 m before crossing)

Level crossing countdown marker (placed at two-thirds of the distance from the crossing, usually 100 m)

Level crossing countdown marker (placed at one-third of the distance from the crossing, usually 50 m)

=== Temporary signs ===
Road works
(formerly used)

Road narrows

Road narrows on left

Road narrows on right

Two-way traffic

Other danger

Uneven road

Loose chippings

Traffic lights

=== Regulatory signs ===
==== Priority signs ====
Give way
(formerly used)

Give way (with fluoro board)

Stop and give way
(formerly used)

Stop and give way (with fluoro board)

Crossroads with priority to the right
(formerly used)

Give priority to vehicles from opposite direction
(formerly used)

Priority road
(formerly used)

End of priority road
(formerly used)

Crossroads
(formerly used)

Junction with a minor side-road from right

Junction with a minor side-road from left

Merging traffic from right
(formerly used)

Merging traffic from left
(formerly used)

Traffic has priority over oncoming vehicles
(formerly used)

==== Prohibition signs ====
No entry

Restricted vehicular access
(formerly used)

No overtaking
(formerly used)

Minimum distance

Maximum speed 50 km/h
(formerly used)

No use of horns
(formerly used)

No overtaking by heavy goods vehicles

No animal-drawn vehicles
(formerly used)

No pedestrians
(formerly used)

No bicycles
(formerly used)

No motorcycles
(formerly used)

No handcarts
(formerly used)

No motor vehicles with four or more wheels, motorized tricycles and motorised quadricycles
(formerly used)

No buses
(formerly used)

No large goods vehicles
(formerly used)

No large goods vehicles over weight shown
(formerly used)

No vehicles with trailer

No tractors

No vehicles carrying dangerous goods

No vehicles carrying explosives or flammable goods

No vehicles carrying goods which could pollute water

No vehicles over width shown
(formerly used)

No vehicles over height shown
(formerly used)

No vehicles over length shown

Maximum weight in tonnes
(formerly used)

Axle weight limit in tonnes
(formerly used)

Derestriction

End of maximum speed
(formerly used)

End of no overtaking
(formerly used)

End of no overtaking by heavy goods vehicles

No parking on side where sign is placed. Without additional inscriptions, it is valid from 8 am to 8 pm on urban roads while on extra-urban roads it is valid at all times.
(formerly used)

No stopping on the side where sign is placed
(formerly used; the additional inscription "DIVIETO DI FERMATA" means "NO STOPPING")

Parking space reserved for vehicles used by people with disabilities
(formerly used). For personal parking, it can be used with the badge's number

Parking place
(formerly used)

Parking ahead in the direction of the arrow
(formerly used)

No parking at all times in front of vehicular access to the side properties (also used )

Parking prohibited at certain times and allowed in others

==== Mandatory signs ====
Drive straight

Turn left

Turn right
(formerly used)

Right turn only ahead

Left turn only ahead

Drive straight or turn left
(formerly used)

Drive straight or turn right
(formerly used or)

Right or left turn only ahead

Keep left

Keep right

Pass either side

Roundabout
(formerly used)

Minimum speed
(formerly used)

End of minimum speed

Snow chains compulsory
(formerly used)

Customs
(formerly used)

EU Country border

Stop, Police roadblock
(formerly used)

Stop, pay toll

Pedestrian path

Cycle lane
(formerly used)

Combined pedestrian and bicycle path

Separated pedestrian and bicycle path

Bridleway
(formerly used)

=== Indication signs ===
Motorway direction

Primary or secondary road direction

Urban area direction

Detour

Direction to a geographical feature or a tourist attraction

Directions in urban areas

Directions at a roundabout in urban areas. The green panel indicates a motorway

Directions on a main highway
(formerly used)

Directions on a main highway with lane canalization

Directions on a motorway

Overhead directional sign

Motorway number sign

Motorway spur number sign
(not an official road sign but it is used)

International tunnel number sign

State highway number sign
(formerly used)

Regional road number sign

Provincial road number sign
(formerly used)

Municipal road number sign
(formerly used)

European road number sign
(formerly used)

Highway location marker

Intermediate highway location marker with hectometre shown in roman numerals (in the example the sign is placed at the kilometre 24.8 of the road)

Motorway location marker and distance from the exit shown (horizontal version)

Motorway location marker and distance from the service area (vertical version)

Main highway location marker and distances from next destinations

Number of overpass along a motorway

Destination that can be reached from next exit on a motorway or an expressway

Town sign: start of urban area (50 km/h speed limit and no use of horn)

Town sign: start of urban area where electric micromobility is being experimented (50 km/h speed limit, no use of horn and particular caution to cyclists and e-scooters)

Town sign (frazione): start of urban area (50 km/h speed limit and no use of horn)

End of urban area, with distances to other towns (end of 50 km/h speed limit and of the prohibition of using horn)

Provincial boundary sign (roads other than motorways)

Provincial boundary sign (motorway)

Regional boundary sign (roads other than motorways)

Regional boundary sign (motorway)

Direction to motorway

Motorway distance sign

Direction to service shown in urban areas (in the example municipal police)

Street name sign

Street name sign with one way

Municipality boundary name sign

River sign

Directions to campsite and beach

Directions to tourist destinations

Direction to an industrial zone

Directions in an industrial area

Hotel information centre ahead

information about hotels

Direction to hotels ahead

Directions to hotels

Bus stop

Tram stop

Pedestrian crossing

Pedestrian crossing (with fluoro board)

School bus stop. If the sign is mounted on a bus it means that bus is used as a school bus
(formerly used)

Emergency telephone

Pedestrian underpass

Pedestrian overpass

Pedestrian ramp

No through road

No through road (side road)

Advisory speed limit

End of advisory speed limit

Fast-traffic highway, only motor vehicles allowed
(formerly used and)

End of road reserved for motor vehicles

Tunnel (roads other than motorways)

Tunnel (motorways)

Bridge (roads other than motorways)

Bridge (motorways)

Home Zone Entry

End of Home Zone

Pedestrian zone

End of pedestrian zone

Restricted vehicular traffic zone

End of restricted vehicular traffic zone

Start of a 30 km/h zone

End of a 30 km/h zone

Bicycle crossing

Bicycle crossing (with fluoro board)

Semi-direct left turn

Indirect left turn

Possibility of reversing the direction of travel (roads other than motorways)

Possibility of reversing the direction of travel (motorways)

Breakdown bay. The background is green on motorway
(formerly used)

Breakdown bay with emergency telephone. The background is blue in roads other than motorway

Use of lanes on extra-urban roads (example)

Bus lane on urban road (example)

Bus lane on urban road (example)

Use of lanes on motorways

End of lane. The background is green on motorway

Increase in the number of lanes. The background is green on motorway

Motorway. If the symbol of motorway is used inside other information signs it has a squared shape

Motorway ahead with a summary of transit restrictions
(Formerly used)

Motorway ends

Expressway. If the symbol of expressway is used inside other information signs it has a squared shape

Expressway ahead with a summary of transit restrictions

Expressway ends

One-way traffic (right)
(formerly used)

One-way traffic (left)
(formerly used)

One-way traffic

Advised direction for trucks ahead

Advised direction for trucks

General speed limit (installed at national borders)
(formerly used )

Information about road condition of passes: road open

Information about road condition of passes: road open and mandatory snow chains

Information about road condition of passes: road open and advised snow chains

Information about road condition of passes: road closed

Information about road condition of passes: road closed after the town shown and mandatory snow chains

Information about road condition of passes: road closed after the town shown and advised snow chains

Hospital
(formerly used)

Hospital

Workshop

Telephone
(formerly used)

Petrol station

Petrol station with unleaded petrol

Information centre

Youth hostel

Picnic site

Camping site

Local radio information. The background is blue in roads other than motorway

Hotel

Restaurant

Coffee

Park and ride (bus station)

Park and ride (tramway)

Park and ride (train or underground)

Park and ride (hiking trail)

Motorail services

Motorail services with sleeper

Taxi stop
(formerly used)

Sewage discharge

Car ferries

Services in motorway service area (plus distance from the next area)

=== Additional panels ===
Distance (in metres)

Distance (in kilometres)

Length of a danger or a prescription (in meters)

Length of a danger or a prescription (in kilometres)

Timetable: the sign applies all day

Timetable: the sign between the hours shown

Timetable: the sign between the hours shown but only in holidays (represented by the cross)

Timetable: the sign between the hours shown but only in working days (represented by the two hammers crossed)

The sign applies only to the category shown (in the example semi-trailer trucks)

The sign doesn't apply to the category shown (in the example buses)

Beginning of a danger or a prescription (vertical)

Continual of a danger or a prescription (vertical)

End of a danger or a prescription (vertical)

Beginning of a danger or a prescription (horizontal)

Continual of a danger or a prescription (horizontal)

End of a danger or a prescription (horizontal)

No road markings or road markings work in progress

Road accident

Crossing of railway linking tracks: the trains move very slowly and usually with the presence of a flagger (this crossing is not considered a level crossing).

Snow removal vehicle at work

Road subject to flooding

Queue

Construction vehicles at work

In case of snow or ice

In case of rain

Slow-moving vehicle ahead

Tow-away zone

Lane sign: an overhead sign applies only to the lane pointed out by this arrow.

Hairpin turn ahead

Number of hairpin turn

Road cleaning

Road cleaning during times shown

Direction of main road (example). It is used with priority sign
(formerly used)

Direction of main road (example). It is used with priority sign

Direction of main road (example). It is used with priority sign

No parking during road cleaning operations

Mandatory direction for vehicles carrying dangerous goods

Mandatory direction ahead for trucks

No trucks

=== Complementary signage ===
Reflexion posts (left and right) on two-way roads

Reflexion posts (left and right) on one-way roads

Chevron marker (turn right)

Chevron marker (turn left)

T-intersection marker

Chevron marker (singular)

Chevron marker (red singular)

=== Traffic lights ===
Normal vehicle traffic light

Vehicle lane traffic light

Traffic light for public transport

Pedestrian light

Traffic light for bicycles

Traffic lights and flashing yellow lights

Flashing yellow traffic light

Onda Verde traffic light

Traffic lights for railway crossings

=== Obsolete signs ===
Dangerous bends

Give way to the line coaches

No U-turns

No right turn

No left turn

No overtaking for trucks

End of no overtaking for trucks

Alternative parking (No parking on the side of the number I on odd days and on the side of the number II on even days)

Alternative parking (No parking on the side of the number I on odd days and on the side of the number II on even days)

Regulated parking
(Parking allowed using disc parking)

Motor vehicle lane

Motorcycle lane

Two lane traffics

==== 1932 road signs ====
Uneven road

Series of bends

Crossroad

Level crossing with barriers

Level crossing without barriers

Danger

Speed limit

Weight limit

== Similar systems ==
- Albania largely shares the same road signage system used in Italy, with the main exception being that the language used is Albanian. European route numbers are not displayed on road signs in Albania.
- Burundi largely shares the same road signage system used in Italy, except that the language used is French.
- Malta's road signage system is a mixture of that of Italy's as well as the United Kingdom's (with certain Italian signs being mirrored due to Malta driving on the left).
- San Marino and the Vatican City—both microstates located within Italy—almost wholly share the same road signage system used in Italy.
- Sierra Leone largely shares the same road signage system used in Italy, except that the language used is English.
- Lebanon largely shares the same road signage designs used in Italy — except those languages used are bilingual (Arabic and English) and have different symbols (e.g. camels, mosques, sand dunes, date palms, crescents).
- Both Libya and Eritrea, which were formerly under Italian rule, largely share the same road signage system used in Italy, with the main exception being the language.

== See also ==
- Road signs in Europe
