= Road signs in Taiwan =

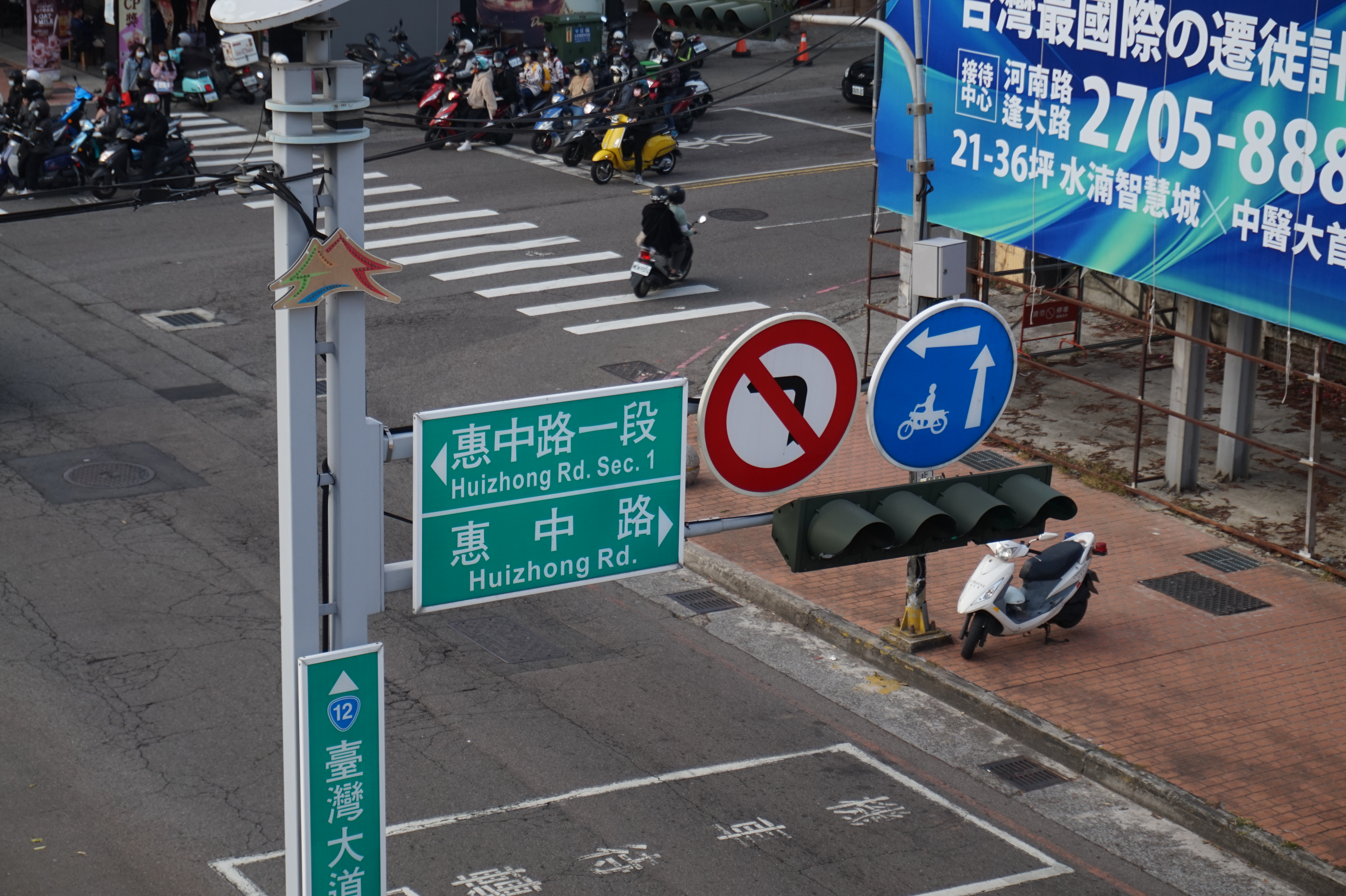
No left turn and motorcycles two-stage left turn signs on Taiwan Boulevard, Taichung City.

Road signs in Taiwan are regulated by “The Regulations for Road Traffic Signs, Markings, and Signals”. (中文:道路交通標誌標線號誌設置規則) To provide vehicle drivers and pedestrians with warnings, regulations, and other information related to road conditions, thereby facilitating travel and promoting traffic safety.

These signs can be categorized into four types: warning signs, regulatory signs, information signs, and auxiliary signs. The English text and numbers on the signs use Highway Gothic.

The Republic of China is a signatory of the “Vienna Convention on Road Traffic” and the “Vienna Convention on Road Signs and Signals”.

Its road signs largely follow or are influenced by the 1968 edition of the Vienna Convention on Road Signs and Signals. They also draw inspiration from many road signs in Europe, the United States (for example, construction signs adopt the diamond-shaped design from the MUTCD), and Japan (for example, the two-stage left turn sign for motorcycles and slow-moving vehicles).

However, certain signs specified in the Convention (such as pedestrian crossing signs and priority road signs) are not used in Taiwan.

== Warning Signs ==
W1: Right Curve

W2: Left Curve

W3: Double Bend First On The Right

W4: Double Bend First On The Left

W5: Steep Uphill Slope

W6: Steep Downhill Slope

W7: Road Narrows

W8: Right Lane Ends

W9: Left Lane Ends

W10: Narrow Bridge

W11: Intersection

W12: Intersection

W13: Intersection

W14: Intersection

W15: Intersection

W16: Intersection

W17: Intersection

W18: Intersection

W19: Intersection

W20: Merging Traffic From Right

W21: Merging Traffic From Left

W22: Diverge

W23: Signal Ahead

W24: Roundabout

W25: Railroad Crossing With Gate

W26: Railroad Crossing Without Gate

W27: Railroad Crossing Without Gate First Warning

W28: Railroad Crossing Without Gate Second Warning

W29: Railroad Crossing Without Gate Third Warning

W30: Rough Road

W31: Bump

W32: Dip in the Road

W33: Slippery Road

W34: Pedestrian Crossing

W35: Children Crossing

W36: Handicapped Crossing

W37: Beware of Animals

W38: Trolley Crossing

W39: Bicycle Crossing
(Before 2009)

W40: Low flying aircraft

W41: Tunnel

W42: Two Way Traffic

W43: Riverside

W44: Cliffs on Right

W45: Cliffs on Left

W46: Falling Rocks (Right)

W47: Falling Rocks (Left)

W48: High Winds

W49: Slow

W50: Danger

W51: Mass Rapid Transit System (MRTS) Vehicle

W52: Speed Measuring Enforcement

== Regulatory Signs ==
In Regulatory Signs, if only "motorcycles" are mentioned, it does not apply to large heavy-duty motorcycles (motorcycles with an engine displacement above 250cc). Because large heavy-duty motorcycles are deemed as car by law, unless road signs specify otherwise.

=== Mandatory Signs ===
R1: Stop And Yield

R2: Yield

R3: Checkpoint

R4: Customs Checkpoint

R5: Stop for Toll

R6: Weigh Station

R7: Through Traffic Only

R8: Right Turn Only

R9: Left Turn Only

R10: Right or Left Turn Only

R11: Through Traffic Only (Lane)

R12: Right Turn Only (Lane)

R13: Left Turn Only (Lane)

R14: Through Traffic or Right Turn Only (Lane)

R15: Through Traffic or Left Turn Only (Lane)

R16: One Way

R17: One Way

R18: Keep Right

R19: Keep Left

R20: Two-stage Left Turn for Slow-Moving Vehicles and Motorcycles (Note: Two-Stage Left Turn Diagram: )

R20.1: Two-stage Right Turn for Slow-Moving Vehicles and Motorcycles

R21: Roundabout Traffic Direction

R22: Pedestrians Only

R22-1: Pedestrian and Bicycle Only

R22-2: Begin Pedestrian Priority Area

R22-3: End Pedestrian Priority Area

R23: Motor Vehicles with 4 Wheels or More Only
(Before 2007)

R23.1: Motor Vehicles with 4 Wheels or More and Large Heavy-Duty Motorcycles with Displacement of over 550cc Only

R23.2: Motor Vehicles with 4 Wheels or More and Large Heavy-Duty Motorcycles Only

R24: Bicycles and Motorcycles Only

R25: Buses Only

R26: Motor Vehicles with 4 Wheels or More Only Lane

R26.1: Motor Vehicles with 4 Wheels or More and Large Heavy-Duty Motorcycles with Displacement of over 550cc Only Lane

R26.2: Motor Vehicles with 4 Wheels or More and Large Heavy-Duty Motorcycles Only Lane

R27: Bicycles and Motorcycles Only Lane

R28: Bus Only Lane

R28.1: Bicycle Only Lane

R28.2: Bicycle Only Lane

R28.3: Mass Rapid Transit System Vehicle Only Lane

R28.4: High-Occupancy Vehicles Only Lane

R29: Snow Chains Required

R30: Honk

R30-1: Turn On Headlights

R31: Railroad Crossing

R32: Multiple Railroad Crossing

R33: Electric Railroad Crossing

R34: Multiple Electric Railroad Crossing

=== Prohibitory Signs ===
P1: No Entry

P2: No Motor Vehicles with 4 Wheels or More

P2.1: No Large Heavy-Duty Motorcycles with a Displacement of over 550cc

P2.2: No Large Heavy-Duty Motorcycles

P3: No Motorcycles

P3.1: No Large Passenger Vehicles

P4: No Large Trucks and Semi-Trailers

P5: No Semi-Trailers

P6: No Large Passenger Vehicles, Large Trucks and Semi-Trailers

P7: No Taxis Without Passengers

P9: No Pedicabs

P10: No Bicycles

P11: No Electric Bicycles

P12: No Animal-Drawn Vehicles

P13: No Pedicabs and Animal-Drawn Vehicles

P15: No Motor Vehicles

P16: Lane No Entry

P17: No Right Turn

P18: No Left Turn and U-Turn

P19: No Turns

P20: Left Turn Only

P21: Right Turn Only

Large Heavy-Duty Motorcycles No Left Turn and U-Turn

Large Trucks and Semi-Trailers No Left Turn and U-Turn

Large Passenger Vehicles No Left Turn and U-Turn

P22: No U-Turn

P23: No Passing

P24: No Pedestrians

P25: No Parking

P26: No Stopping

P27: Priority On The Opposite Road

=== Limitation Signs ===
L1: Weight Limit

L2: Width Limit

L3: Height Limit

L4: Length Limit

L4-1: Safety Distance

L5: Maximum Speed

L6: Minimum Speed

== Guide Signs ==
G0: Tourist Recreation Area: Direction

G0.1: Tourist Recreation Area: Advanced Notice of Driving Direction

G0.2: Tourist Recreation Area: Driving Direction and Distance

G0.3: Tourist Recreation Area: Location

Gym

Sports Field

Baseball Field

Park

Campsite

Zoo

G0.4: Cycling Route

G0.5: Cycling Route

G1: National Expressway

G2: Provincial Highway
(Before 1994)

G2: Provincial Highway

G2: Provincial Highway

G2: Provincial Highway

G2.1: Expressway

G3: County Highway

G3.1: County Highway

G3.2: County Highway

G4: Rural Highway

G4.1: Cycling Route

G7: Eastbound

G8: Southbound

G9: Westbound

G10: Northbound

G11: Direction of Traffic (Through Traffic)

G12: Direction of Traffic (Left or Right Turn)

G13: Direction of Traffic (Right Turn)

G14: Direction of Traffic (Right Turn)

G15: Direction of Traffic (Left Turn)

G16: Direction of Traffic (Left Turn)

G17: Direction of Traffic (Go Straight and Turn Right)

G18: Direction of Traffic (Go Straight and Turn Right)

G19: Direction of Traffic (Go Straight and Turn Left)

G20: Direction of Traffic (Go Straight and Turn Left)

G21: Destination

G21.1: Destination

G22: Destination Guide Signs

G22.1: Destination Guide Signs

G22.2: Destination Guide Signs

G22.3: Destination Guide Signs

G22.4: Destination Guide Signs

G22.5: Destination Guide Signs

G22.6: Destination Guide Signs

G23: Destination and Mileage

G23.1: Destination and Mileage

G23.2: Destination and Mileage

G24: Destination and Mileage

G24.1: Destination and Mileage

G25: Street Name

G25.1: Street Name

G26: Climbing lane Ahead

G27: Slow Vehicles Keep Right

G28: Large Vehicles Keep Right

G29: Lane to Destination

G29.1: Lane to Destination

G30: Direction to Freeway or Expressway

G30.1: Direction to Freeway or Expressway

G30.2: Direction to Freeway or Expressway

G31: Exit Destination

G32: Exit Destination

G33: Exit Destination

G33-1: Exit Destination

G33-2: Exit Destination

G33-1: Exit Distance

G33-1.1: Exit Distance

G33-1.2: Exit Distance

G33-2.1: High-Occupancy Vehicles Only Lane Ahead

G33-2.2: High-Occupancy Vehicles Only Lane on Left

G33-2.3: High-Occupancy Vehicles Only Lane Ahead

G33-3.1: High-Occupancy Vehicles Only Lane End Ahead

G33-3.2: High-Occupancy Vehicles Only Lane End

G34: Number of Exits

G35: Exits with Mileage

G36: Interchange Name

G36

G36

G37: Exit

G37

G38: Service Area Ahead

G39: Exit to Service Area

G40: Rest Area Ahead

G41: Exit to Rest Area

G42: Toll Station Ahead

G43: Traffic Info Radio

G44: Milestone

G45: Milepost

G46: Parking Lot

G47: Parking Lot

G48: Parking Facility

G48.1: Parking Facility

G49: Disabled Parking Only

G52: Tow Pound

G53: MRT Station

G53.1: Airport

G53.2: Port

G53.3: Train Station

G53.4: High Speed Rail Station

G53.5: Bus Station

G53-5.1: Cable Car Station

G53-5.2: Stations

G53-5.3: Station Name

G53-1: Government Agencies

G54: Pedestrian Bridge

G55: Underpass

G56: Emergency Medical Services

G57: Garage

G58: Gas Station

G58-1: Gas Station (Liquid Petroleum Gas)

G58-2: Charging Station

G58-3: Electric Vehicle Charging Station

G58-4: Electric Motorcycle Charging Station

G58-5: Electric Motorcycle Battery Swap Station

G59: Telephone

G60: Ferry Terminus

G61: Food & Drink

G62: School

G63: Hospital

G64: Escape Ramp

G65: Dead End

G66: U-Turn Lane

G67: Detour Guide

G67: Detour Guide

G67: Detour Guide

G68: Road Closed

G69: Alternate Route

G69.1: Alternate Route

G69.2: Alternate Route

G69.3: Alternate Route

== Auxiliary Signs ==
A1: Lanes Designated

A2: Follow the Arrow

A2: Follow the Arrow

A2: Follow the Arrow

A2: Follow the Arrow

A3: Reversible Lane Centerline

Warning Sign (Fog Area)

Prohibitory Sign (No Passing)

Driving Guide Sign (Pedestrians priority)

Driving Information Sign (Exact Change Only Lane)

Begin School Zone

End School Zone

Malfunction Warning Signs

=== Barricades ===
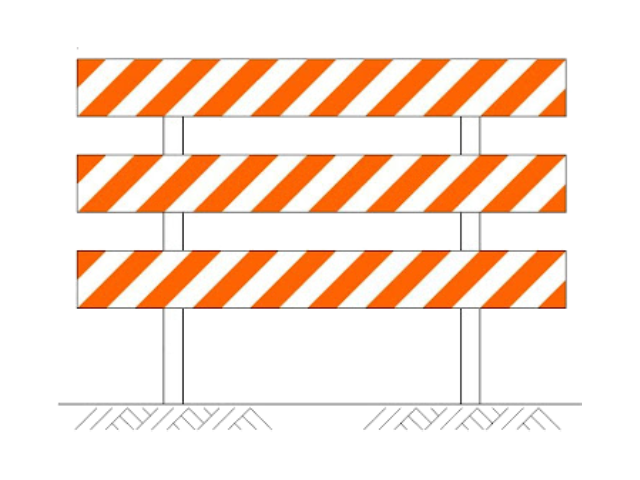
Barricades

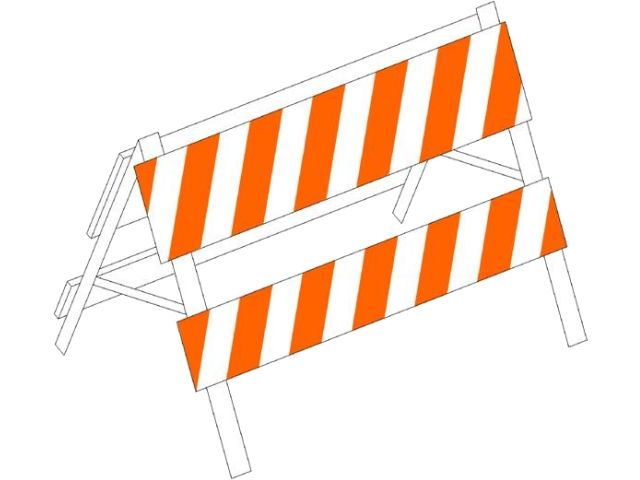
Barricades

B1: Road works

B2: Slow

B3: Road Closed

B4: Detour

B5: Traffic Control

B6: Detour to Left

B7: Detour to Right

=== Construction Signs ===
C1: Road Works Ahead

C2: Road Works Ahead

C3: Road Works

C4: Road Closed Ahead

C5: Road Closed Ahead

C6: Road Closed

C7: Lane Closed Ahead

C8: Lane Closed Ahead

C9: Lane Closed

C10: Lane Closed Ahead

C11: Lane Closed Ahead

C12: Lane Closed

C13: Lane Closed Ahead

C14: Lane Closed Ahead

C15: Lane Closed

C16: Road Closed Ahead

C17: Road Closed Ahead

C18: Detour to Left

C19: Detour to Right

C20: Single-Lane Traffic

== Supplementary plates ==
Reverse Turns for 10 km

8% Steep Downhill Slope for 1 km

Road Narrows for 2 km

Right Lane Ends 200 m Ahead

Merging Traffic From Right

Slow

Stop

Yield

Keep Right (Left)

Two-stage Left (Right) Turn for Bicycles and Motorcycles

Pedestrians Have Right of Way

No Parking Time and Zone

No Merge

Large Vehicles No Merge

Hourly Rate

Parking Lot Direction

Parking Lot for Regular Light Vehicle

Parking Lot for Cars and Motorcycles

Charge Time

School

Hospital

Hospital Direction and Distance

School Arrival and Dismissal Times

== Deleted Signs ==
=== Deleted in 1969 ===
I, 20
Crossroads with priority

II, B.2
Bicycle Track

III, A.8
Priority road

III, A.9
End of priority road

=== Deleted in 1989 ===
W30: Drawbridge

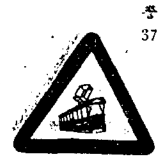
W37: Tramway crossing

W45: Road Works

P7: No entry for trailers

P18: No Cars, Motorcycles, Pedicabs and Animal-Drawn Vehicles

P24: No overtaking for lorries

P30: Use of horn prohibited

P32: End of speed limit

G13: Provincial Boundary
(Zhejiang Province)

=== Deleted in 2007 ===
P8: No Carts

P14: No Pedicabs and Carts

=== Deleted in 2008 ===
P11: No Motor Pedicabs

G5: Provincial (City) Boundary
(Taipei City)

G6: County (City) Boundary
(Taipei County)

=== Deleted in 2012 ===
P15: No Motor Vehicles and Animal-Drawn Vehicles
