= Road signs in Japan =

Japanese road signs as of 2024

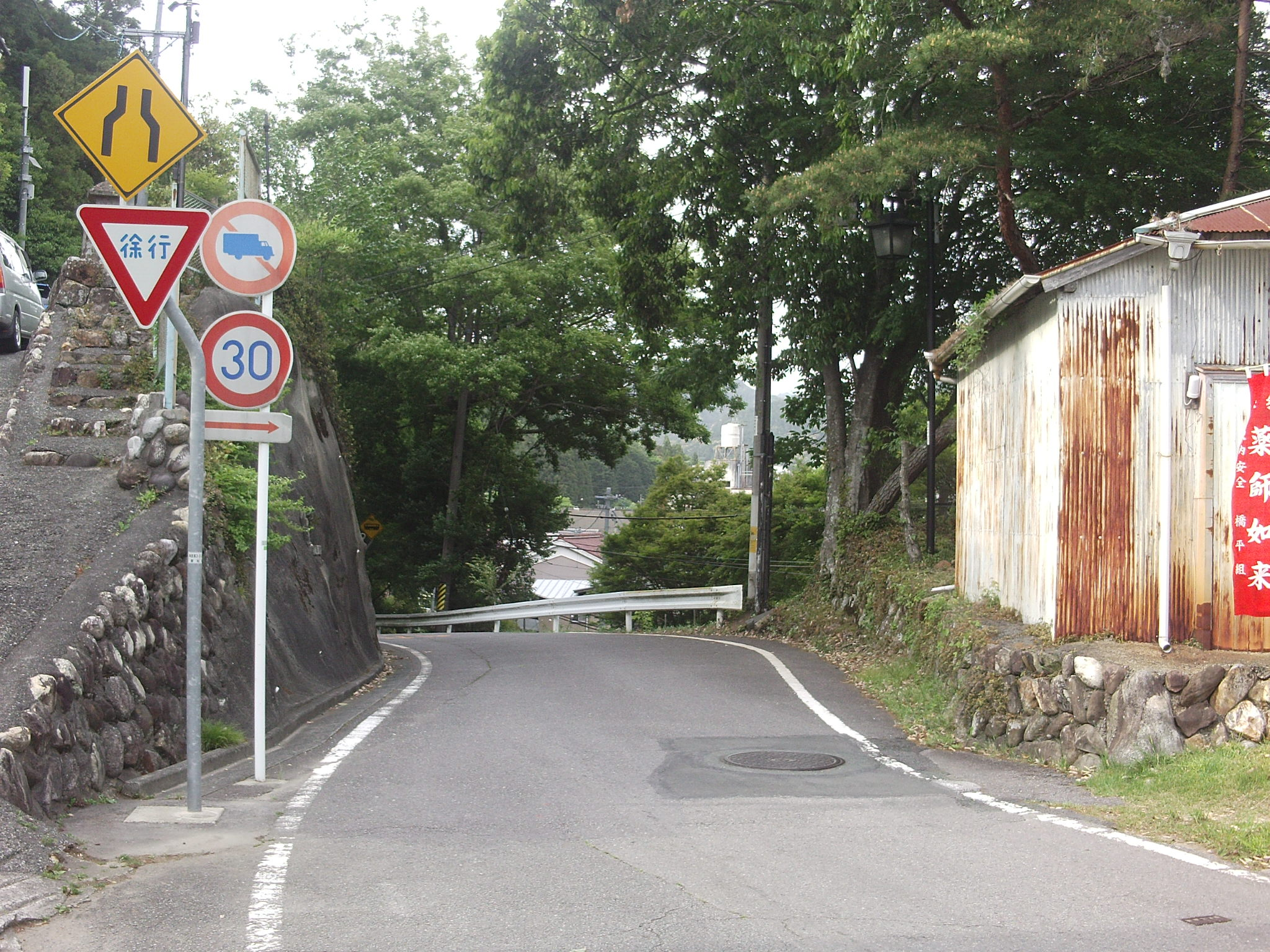
Signs on Aichi prefectural road No.439 in Toyooka, Shinshiro, Aichi; road narrows, slow down (former design), no trucks and speed limit 30 km/h

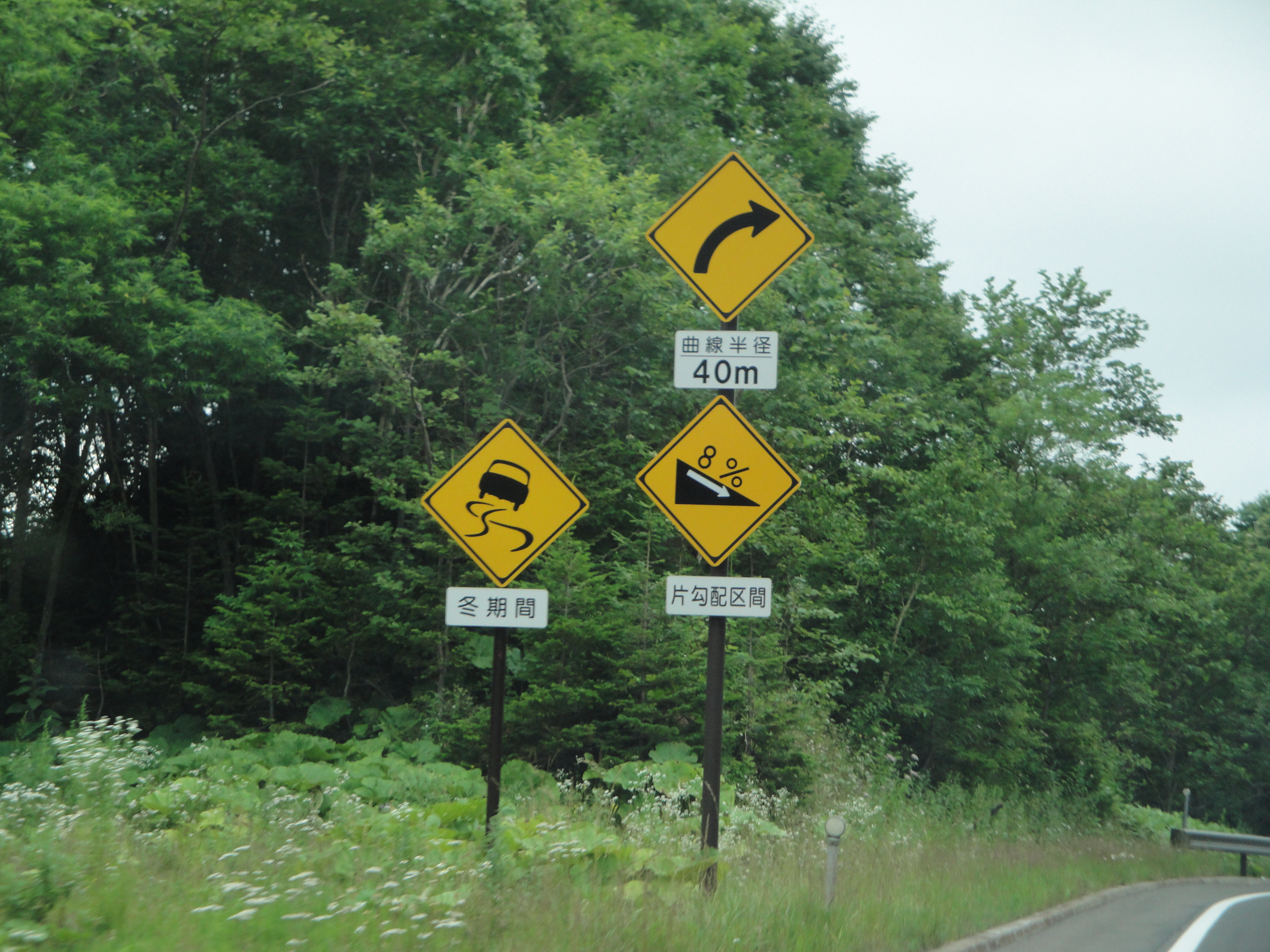
A road of traffic signs

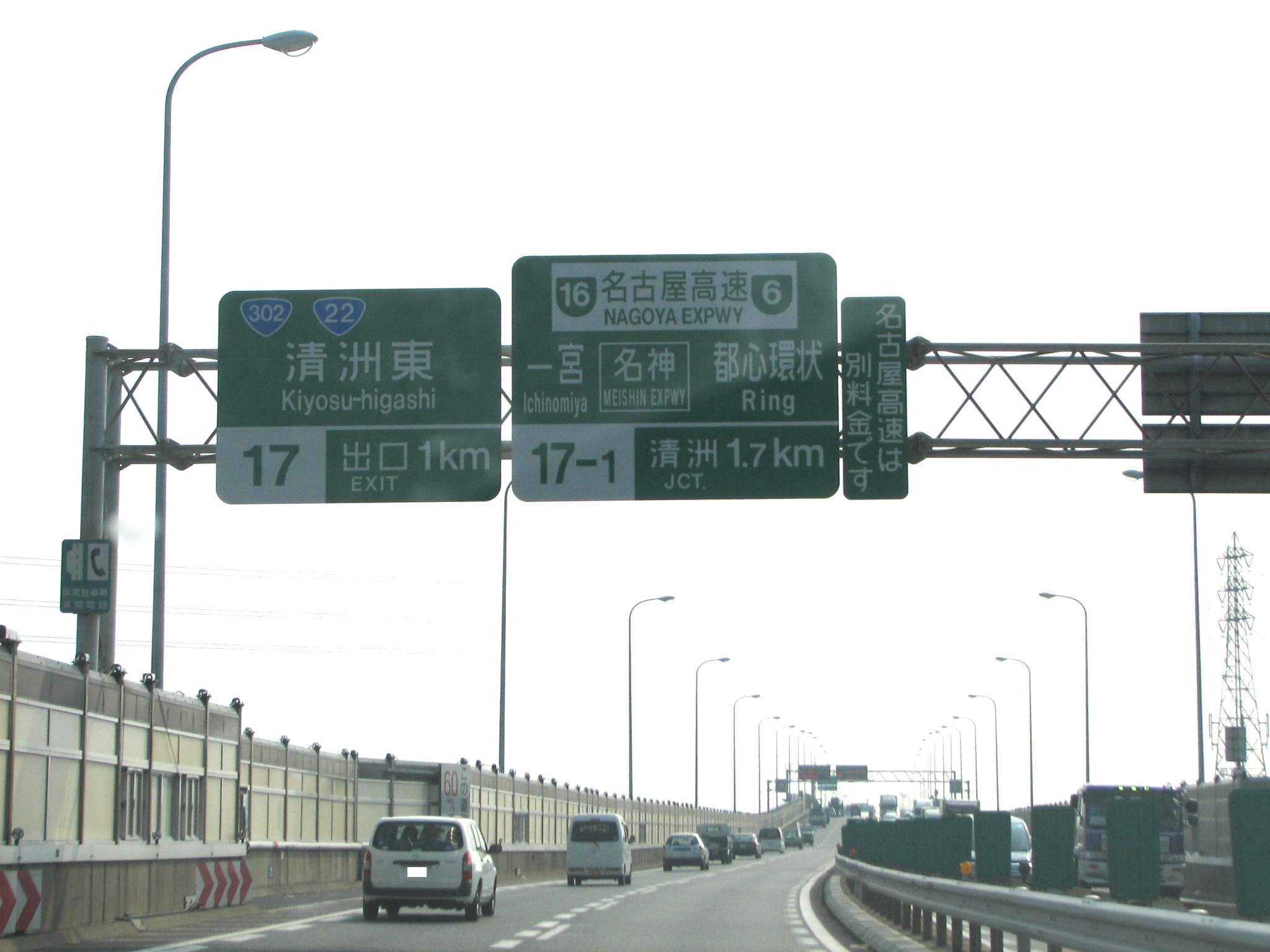
Meinikan Expressway of Japan

Road signs in Japan are standardized by the "Order on Road Sign, Road Line, and Road Surface Marking (道路標識、区画線及び道路標示に関する命令)" established in 1968 with origins from the Tokyo Metropolitan Police Department's "Order on Standardization of Road Sign" of 1934 and the Home Ministry of Japan's "Order on Road Signs" of 1942. The previous designs have been used since 1986 after several amendments of order.

They are divided into "Principal Sign" (本標識, hon-hyōshiki) and "Supplemental Sign" (補助標識, hojo-hyōshiki).

== History ==
1922 Japanese road warning sign for crossroads. The design is similar to British pre-Worboys signage, except that the lettering was white and the background was black.

The first standardised road signage schemes appeared in 1922. At first, two types of signs were established: "road warning signs" equivalent to warning signs and "road guide signs" as information signs. Warning signs at that time closely resembled the British design as used in Hong Kong, the only difference was the white-on-black lettering.

Japanese road signs in the early 1940s closely followed European road signage practices at that time based on the 1931 Geneva Convention, except that most road signages contained text. A variation of the early 1940s Japanese road signage system is still in use today in Taiwan.

In 1950, a complete revision of the "Road Signs Ordinance" was promulgated and enforced as an Ordinance of the Prime Minister's Office and the Ministry of Construction. Unlike the 1922 and the 1940s devised road signs, it included both bilingual Japanese and English text and symbols. Warning signs were changed from a European red-bordered triangular design to an American MUTCD yellow diamond design. It also introduces the yellow American stop sign that only lasted for 10 years. This road signage system was used until 1963, when it was replaced with a new road signage system that is based on the Vienna Convention on Road Signs and Signals. The present-day Japanese road signage system also replaced the stop sign's shape with an inverted equilateral triangle like the old stop sign used in China.

The octagonal "stop" sign design recommended by the Vienna Convention on Road Signs and Signals

In 2016, it was announced that the Japanese National Police Agency was considering changing the design of the "Stop" sign used on Japanese roads since 1963 from the inverted red triangle sign to an octagonal design more closely conforming to the recommendations of the 1968 Vienna Convention on Road Signs and Signals. The inverted red triangle sign was introduced in 1963 ahead of the 1964 Summer Olympic Games in Tokyo, and replaced the earlier red octagonal sign used from 1960, which in turn had replaced the yellow octagonal sign used from 1950. It was later decided to make the stop sign bilingual in both Japanese and English, but to maintain the inverted triangular shape.

== Principal signs ==
Principal signs (本標識, hon-hyōshiki) are categorized into 4 types; guide, warning, regulatory and instruction signs.

=== Guide signs ===
Guide signs (案内標識, an'nai-hyōshiki) indicates directions or distances of the road. Guide signs have dark green backgrounds and white text for expressways. In urban areas and on national highways, direction signs have dark blue backgrounds. The signs are normally written in Japanese and English. Since 2014, Vialog is used as the typeface for English words and Place name Transcriptions.

Expressway ramp ahead

Expressway exit ahead

Exits and distance (expressway)

Junction (expressway)

Expressway number (E1; Tomei)

Expressway shield (E4; Tōhoku)

Urban Expressway shield (C1; Shuto C1)

Intersection

Intersection

Distance of cities and areas

National highway shield (Route 20)

National highway shield

National highway shield

Prefectural highway shield (Fukuoka Route 758)

Prefectural highway shield

Prefectural highway shield (inter-city route)

Prefectural highway shield

Prefectural highway shield (inter-city route)

Street name

Detour

Detour

Mitigated limitation of height (expressway)

Mitigated limitation of weight

=== Warning signs ===
Warning signs (警戒標識, keikai-hyōshiki) warn drivers of dangers or situations that they must pay attention to. Their design, black pattern and border on yellow diamond (usually with 45 cm per a side), is based on the U.S. MUTCD.

Crossroads

T-intersection with road on the right

T-junction

T-intersection with road on the left

Y-junction

Traffic circle / Roundabout

Curve to the right

Curve to the left

Sharp curve to the right

Sharp curve to the left

Double curve, first to the right

Double curve, first to the left

Double sharp, first to the right

Double sharp, first to the left

Winding road first curve to the right

Winding road first curve to the left

Railroad crossing ahead
Steam locomotive

Railroad crossing ahead
Electric train

School ahead

Traffic light ahead

Slippery road

Fallen rocks

Bumpy road

Traffic merges from the left

Left lane ends

Road narrows on both sides

Two-way traffic ahead

Steep descent (10%, 1:10)

Steep ascent (10%, 1:10)

Men at work

Crosswind

Watch for large animals (deer)

Watch for large animals (rabbit)

Watch for large animals (monkey)

Watch for large animals (raccoon dogs)

Other danger
The nature of the danger is written on the supplementary sign

=== Regulatory signs ===
Regulatory signs (規制標識, kisei-hyōshiki) show the regulations of each roads in order to keep road condition and prevent dangers of traffic.

The stop sign is a red, downward-pointing triangle, with the text 止まれ (tomare) & "stop" (in English, for the pre-1963 and current designs only) in white. Prohibition signs are round with white backgrounds, red borders, and blue pictograms. Mandatory instruction signs are round with blue backgrounds and white pictograms.

Stop and slow down

Slow down (In Japanese and English, current design from 2017)

Stop (In Japanese and English, current design from 2017)

Stop (In English Only, used in United States Armed Forces Bases in Japan.)
Exclusions

Road closed to all

Road closed to vehicles

No entry

No motor vehicles except motorcycles and mopeds

No trucks

No buses

No motorbikes or general mopeds

No non-motorized vehicles except bicycles

No bicycles or specified small motorized bicycles

No motor vehicles

No two-person motorbikes

No vehicles carrying dangerous goods

Weight limit

Height limit

Width limit

Motor vehicles only (except mopeds)

Bicycles and specified small motorized bicycles only

Bicycles and pedestrians only

Pedestrians only

Road closed to pedestrians
Turns

Only straight ahead or left turn permitted

Only straight ahead or right turn permitted

Turn left

Turn right

No turns

Turn left or right

Directions permitted

Roundabout

Keep left

Keep right

No crossing center line to enter e.g. a car park

No U-turn

Two-stage right turn for general mopeds required.

Two-stage right turn for general mopeds not required.
Restrictions

No crossing center line to overtake. 追越し禁止 sign below = no passing at all

Speed limit

End of special speed limit
The statutory speed limit applies

End of speed restriction limit

Minimum speed limit

One-way street to the left

One way street to the right

One-way street ahead

One way (bicycles and specified small motorized bicycles)

Trucks use left lane

Buses-only lane

Bike lane

Buses-priority lane

Lane usage

Lane usage

Lane usage

Lane usage

Use car horns

No jaywalking
Parking and stopping

No stopping

No parking

Restricted parking

Parallel parking

Perpendicular parking

Angle parking

=== Instruction signs ===
Instruction signs (指示標識, shiji-hyōshiki) show points and devices on the road that drivers should pay attention.

Cyclists are permitted to ride side-by-side.

Driving on tram line permitted (Except two-wheelers)

Priority road

Center line

Stop line

Parking zone

Stopping permitted

Crosswalk
Alt. A

Crosswalk
Alt. B: school zone

Bike crossing

Bike and crosswalk

Tram stop

Controls ahead

== Supplemental signs ==
Supplemental signs (補助標識, hojo-hyōshiki) are usually put just below the principal signs, and shows their valid range like time, day and category of vehicle. They are equivalent to the "plaque" of the American MUTCD. The width of the plates is usually 60 cm, and the sentences should be less than 7 characters per a line or 3 lines. When the sentences can not be shortened less than the limitation, they should apply changeable signs.

100 meters ahead

Next 50 meters

Except Sundays and Holidays

8 a.m. to 8 p.m.

Except general mopeds

Large trucks

Bicycles (symbol)

Cars (symbol)

Cars (side view)

Trucks (symbol)

Buses (symbol)

Trucks carrying over 3 tonnes (symbol)

Only for permitted vehicles

Leave at least 6 meters road width clear when you park

Permitted until the time the parking meter shows

Restriction begins (symbol)

Restriction begins

Restriction begins

Restricted zone (symbol)

Restricted zone

End of restriction (symbol)

End of restriction

End of restriction

End of restriction

School zone

No passing or overtaking

Yield

Train crossing caution

Caution crosswind

Caution wild animals

Caution

Safety speed: 30 km/h

Caution soft shoulder

Be quiet

Direction

Control zone: Honmachi, Komoro

Starts

Ends

== Other signs ==
Expressway name (Tomei)

Asian Highway route shield (AH1)

Ferry (pictogram established in Japanese Industrial Standards)

== Retired signs ==
Slow down (In Japanese Only, phased out in 2017)

Yield (In Japanese Only, phased out in 2017)

Stop (In Japanese Only, used from 1963 to 2017)

=== 1922 road signs ===
Crossroads

Steep ascent

Gentle curve to the left

Gentle curve to the right

School

Level crossing

Steep descent

=== 1942 road signs ===
Weight limit

Speed limit

No turns

No U-turns

No motor vehicles

No parking

No trucks

No entry

Straight ahead or right turn permitted

Turn right

Road closed to vehicles

No bicycles

No non-motorized vehicles except bicycles

No motorcycles

Winding road

Danger

School

Slow down

Level crossing

Crossroads

Gentle curve to the left

Gentle curve to the right

=== 1950 road signs ===
Crossroads

T-intersection

T-junction

Y-junction

Curve

Sharp curve

Double curve

Double sharp curve

Winding road

Railroad crossing ahead

School

Danger

Caution

Road closed

Closed to all vehicles

Closed to cars

Closed to carts

Closed to bicycles

Closed to pedestrians

No U-turn

No left turn

No right turn

Right turn only

Left turn only

No turns

No entry

No passing

No stopping

No parking

Speed limit

Speed limit ends

Weight limit

Height limit

Quiet

Horn

One way

Stop

Pedestrian crossing

Parking area

Stop line

Safety zone

Construction zone

Detour

=== 1960 road signs ===
Road closed

Closed to all vehicles

Closed to all motor vehicles

Closed to large-sized motor vehicles

Closed to all motor vehicles and bicycles with motor

Closed to carts

Closed to bicycles

Closed to pedestrians

No left turn

No right turn

Right turn only

Left turn only

No turns

No crossing for pedestrians on left

No crossing for pedestrians on right

No crossing for vehicles

No U-turn

No backing

No passing

No parking

No parking or stopping

Dangerous goods prohibited

Maximum width

Load limit

Clearance

Maximum speed limit

Minimum speed limit

Motor vehicles only

One way (left)

One way (right)

Drive to the right side

May drive on tramway

Right turn toward immediate outside

Slow down

May stopping

May parking

May parking or stopping

Parking line

Right-angle parking

Angle parking

Sound horn

Section for sound of horn

Stop

== Photographs ==
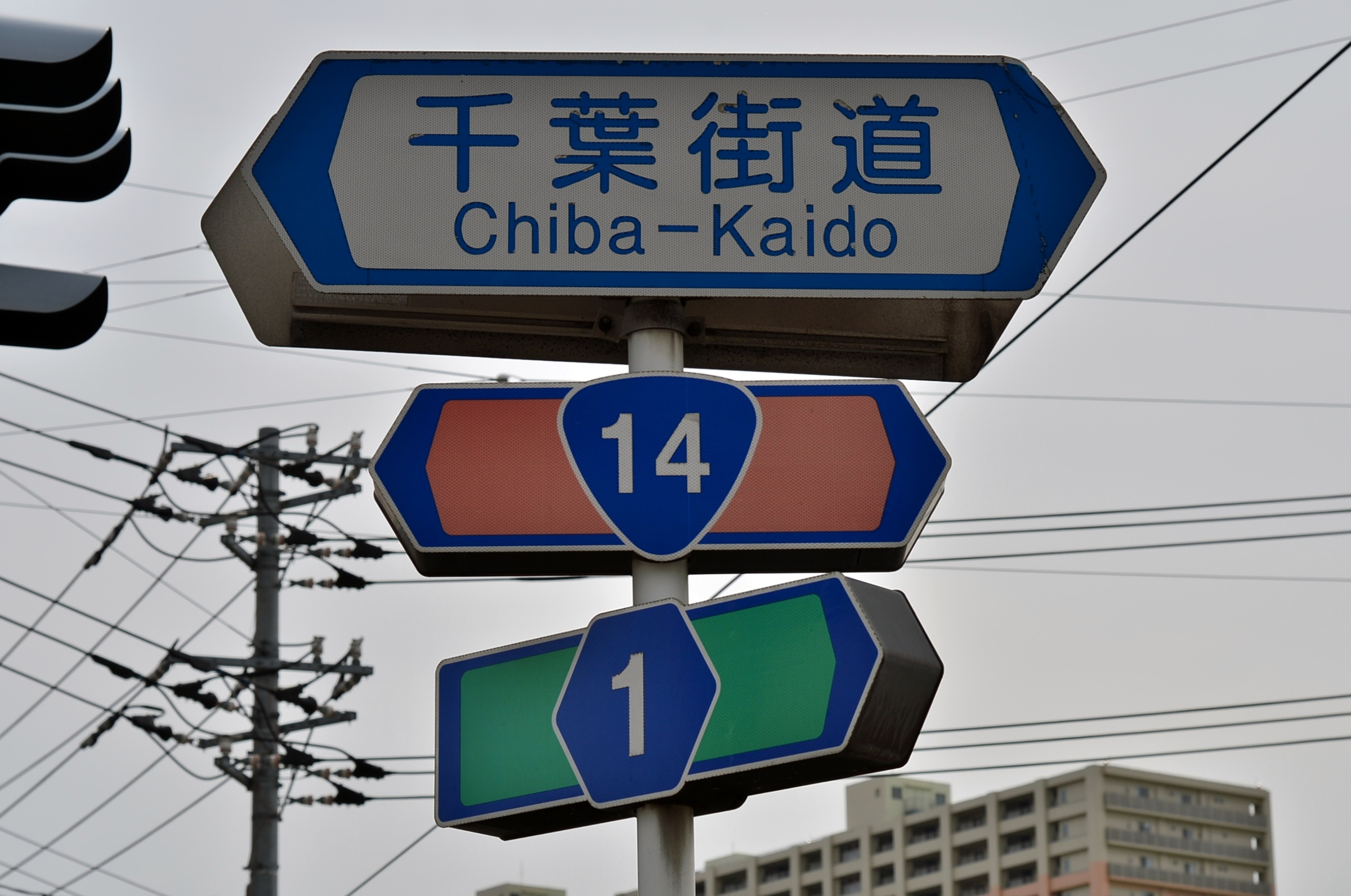
Street name and highway shields (Chiba Prefecture)

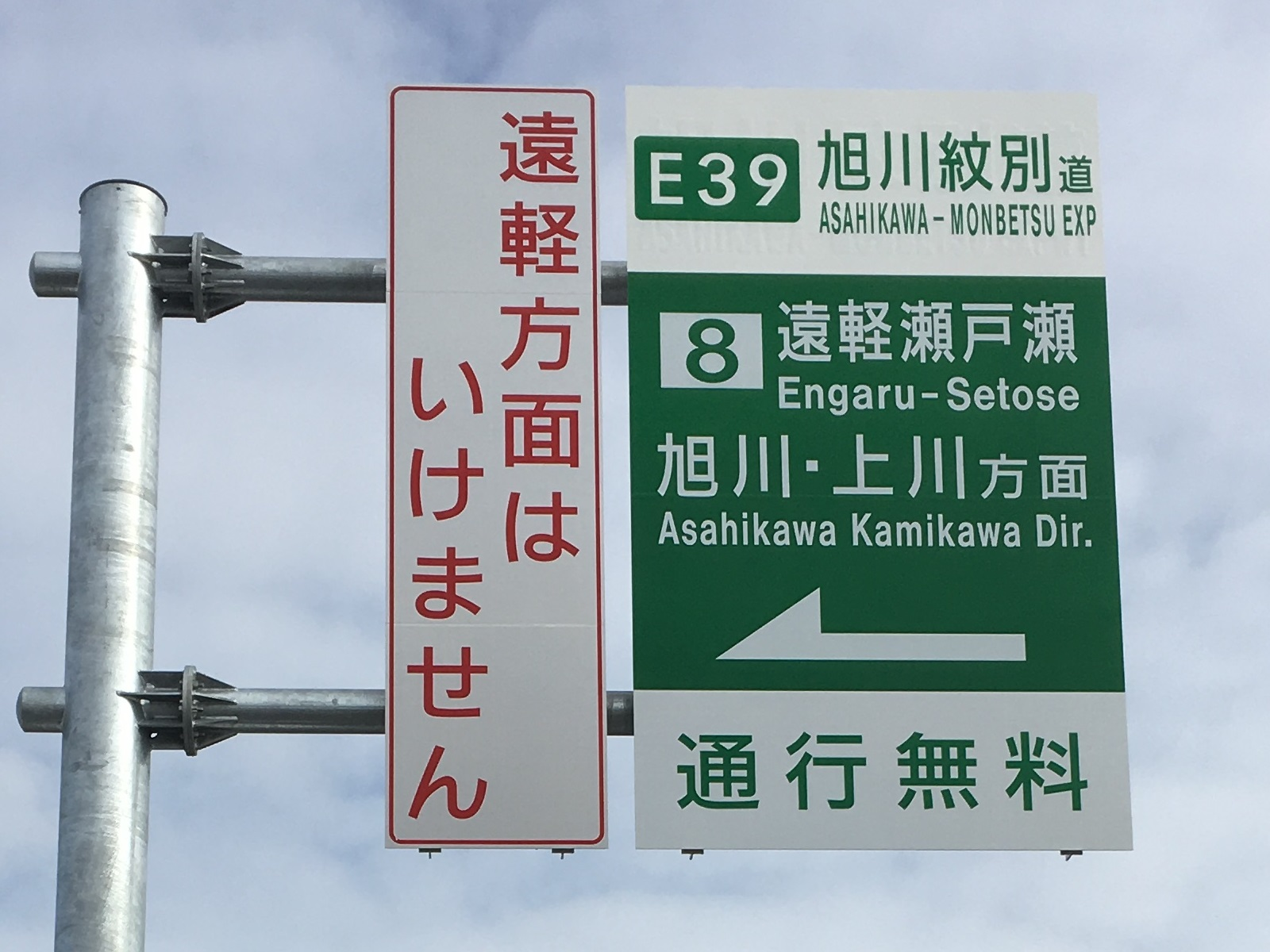
Expressway exit sign

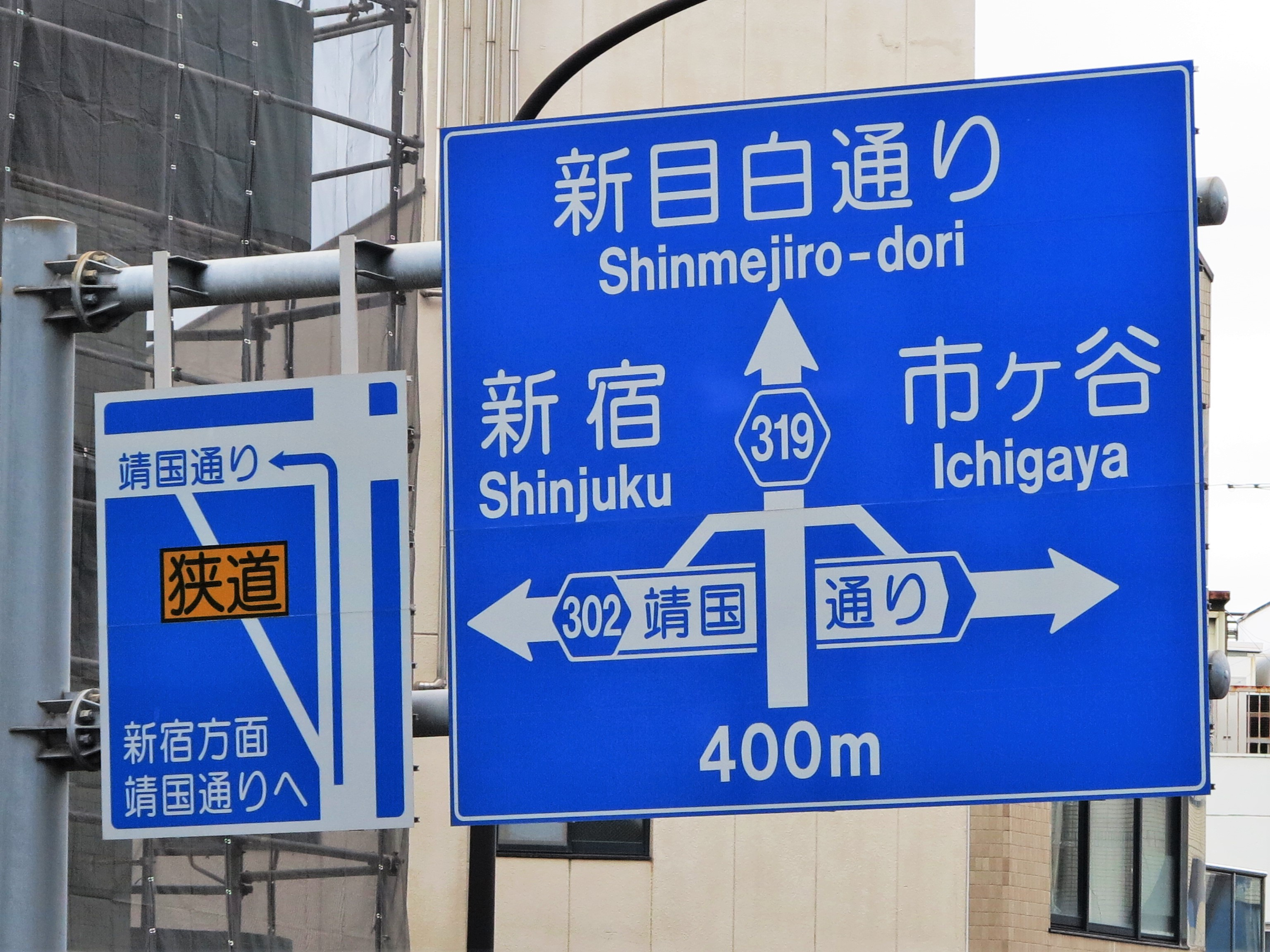
Intersection guide sign

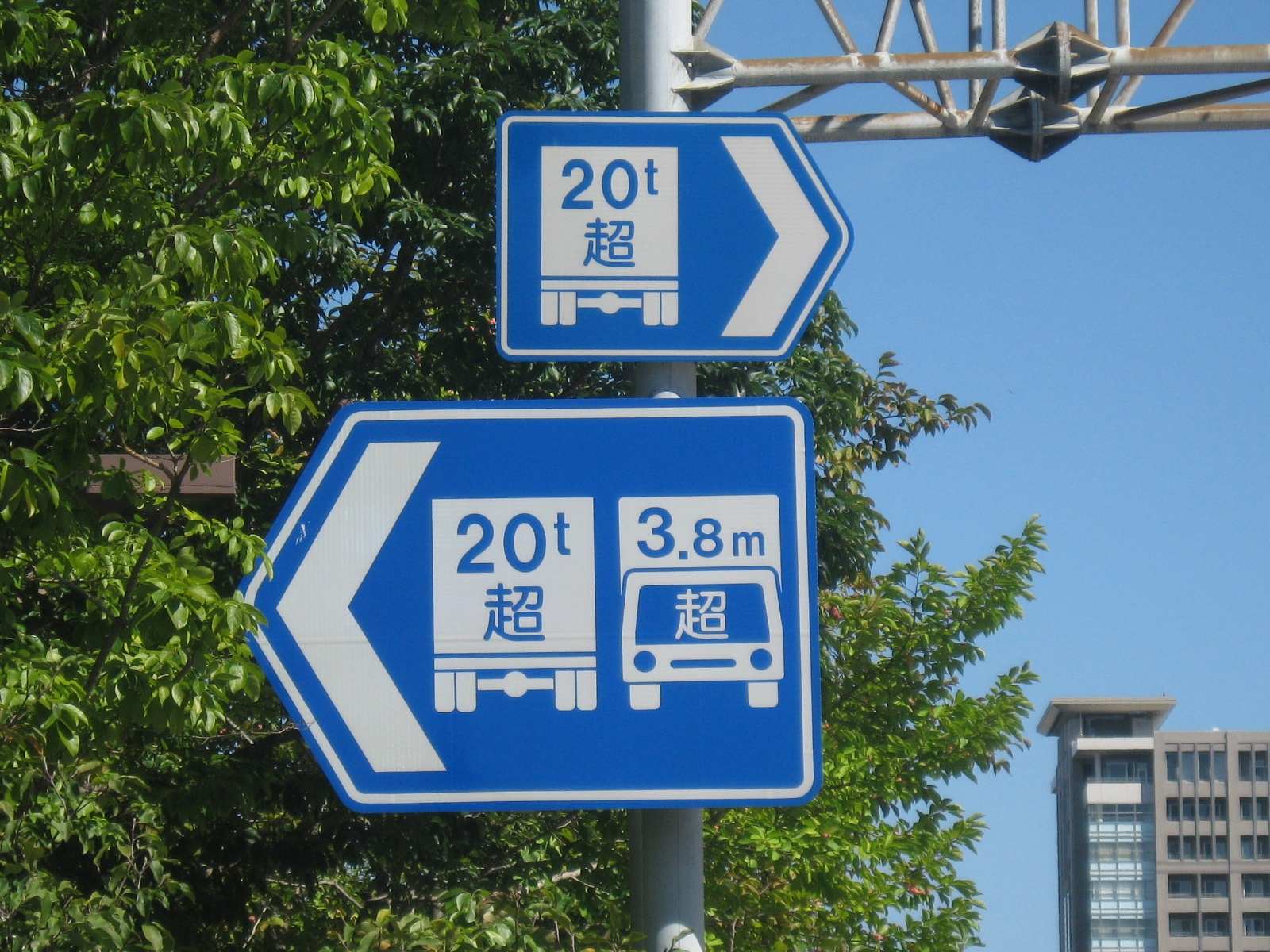
Height and weight restrictions apply (to streets pointed to by arrows)

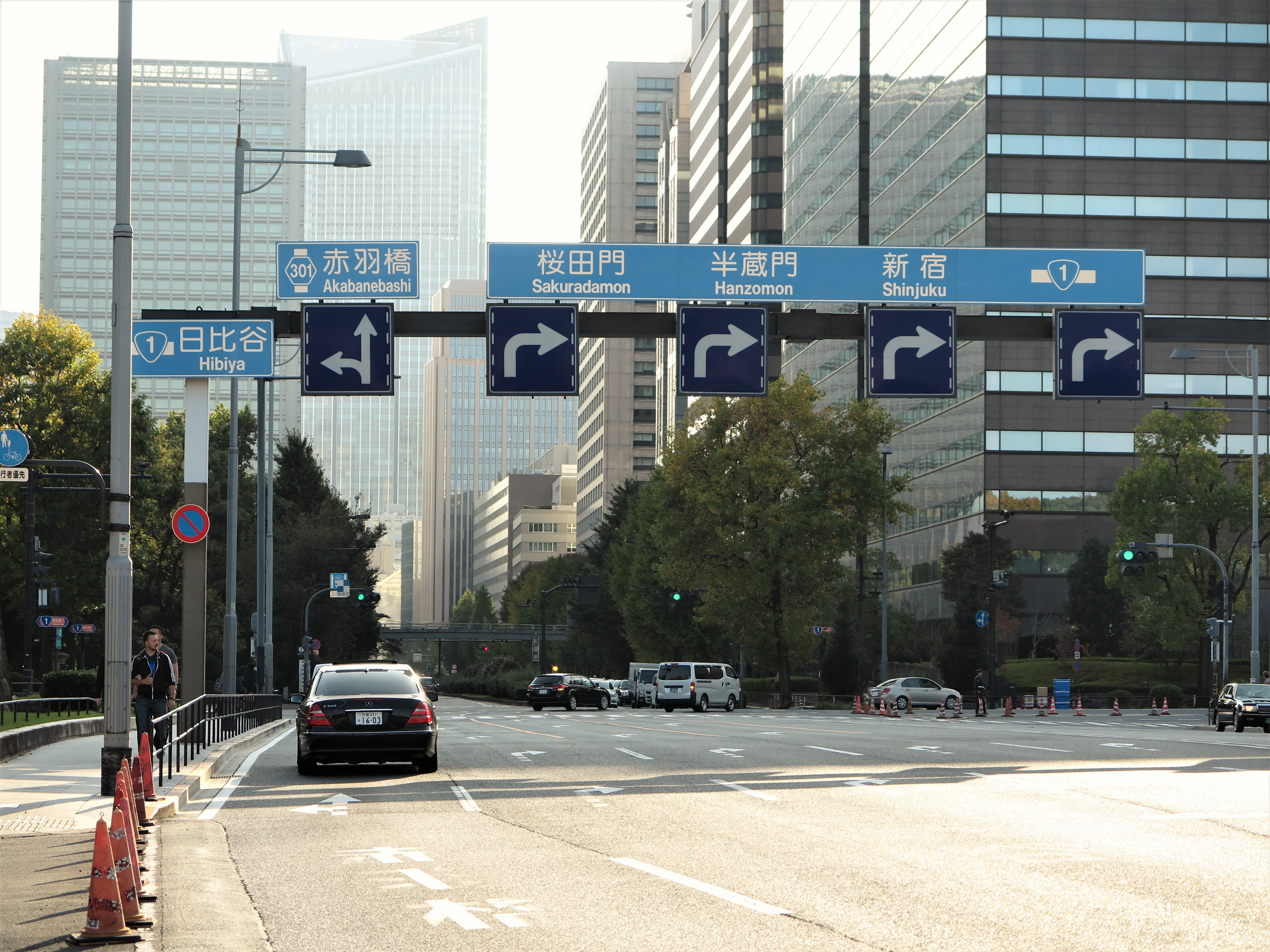
Lane usage signs

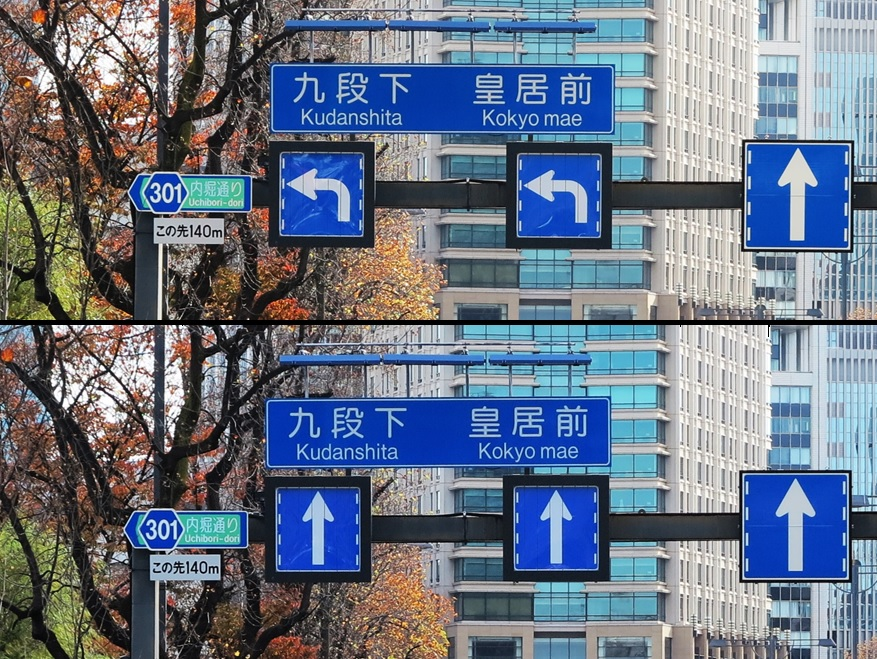
Changeable lane usage signs

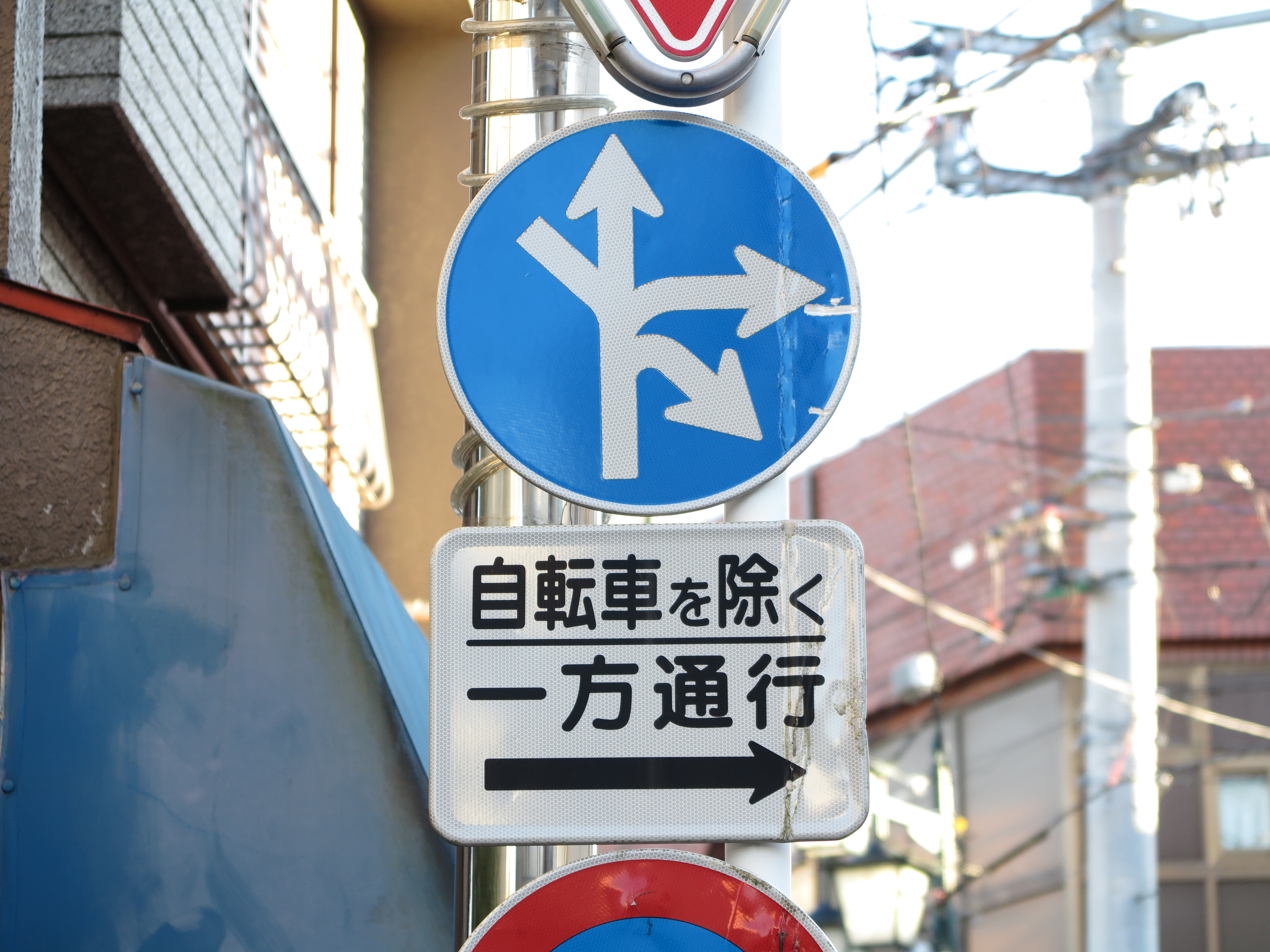
Directions permitted

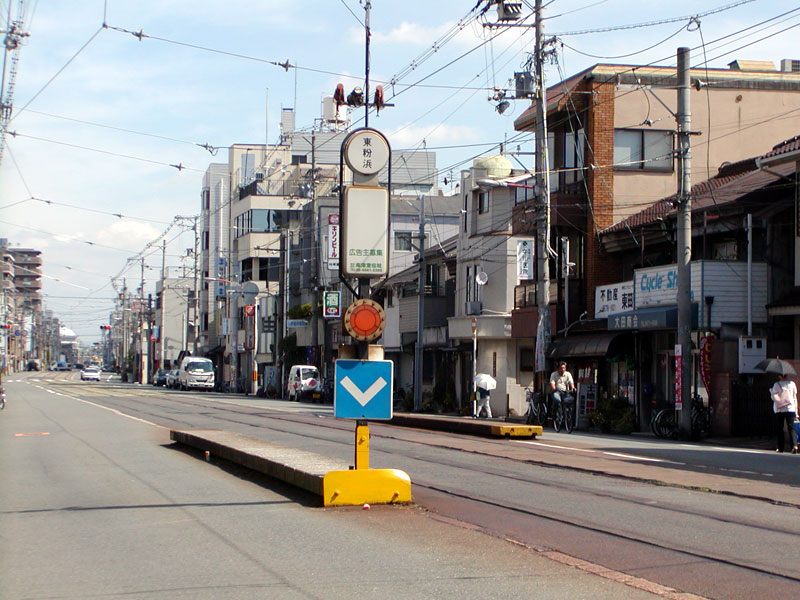
Tram stop

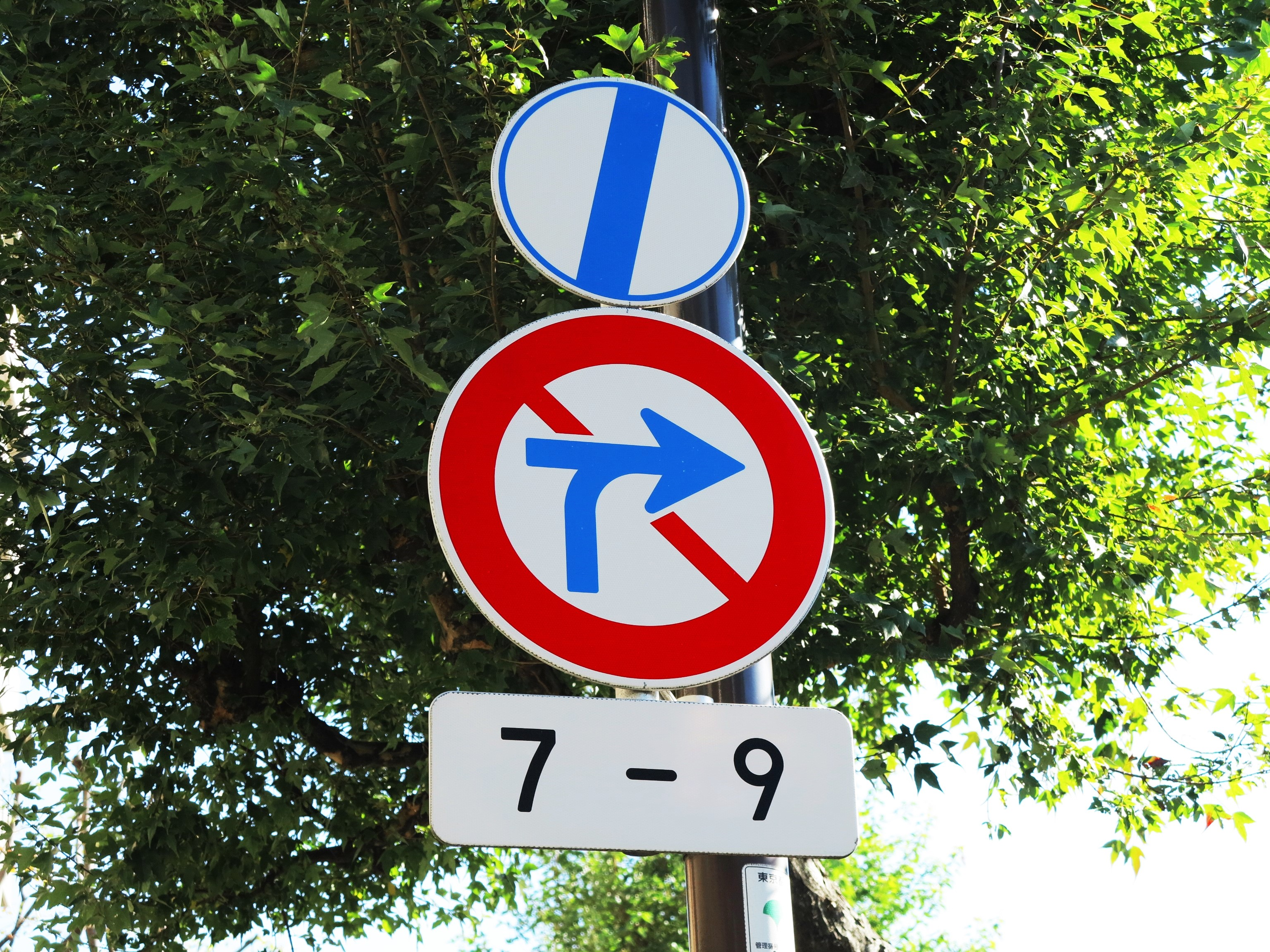
Right turn prohibition (7-9 a.m.) ends

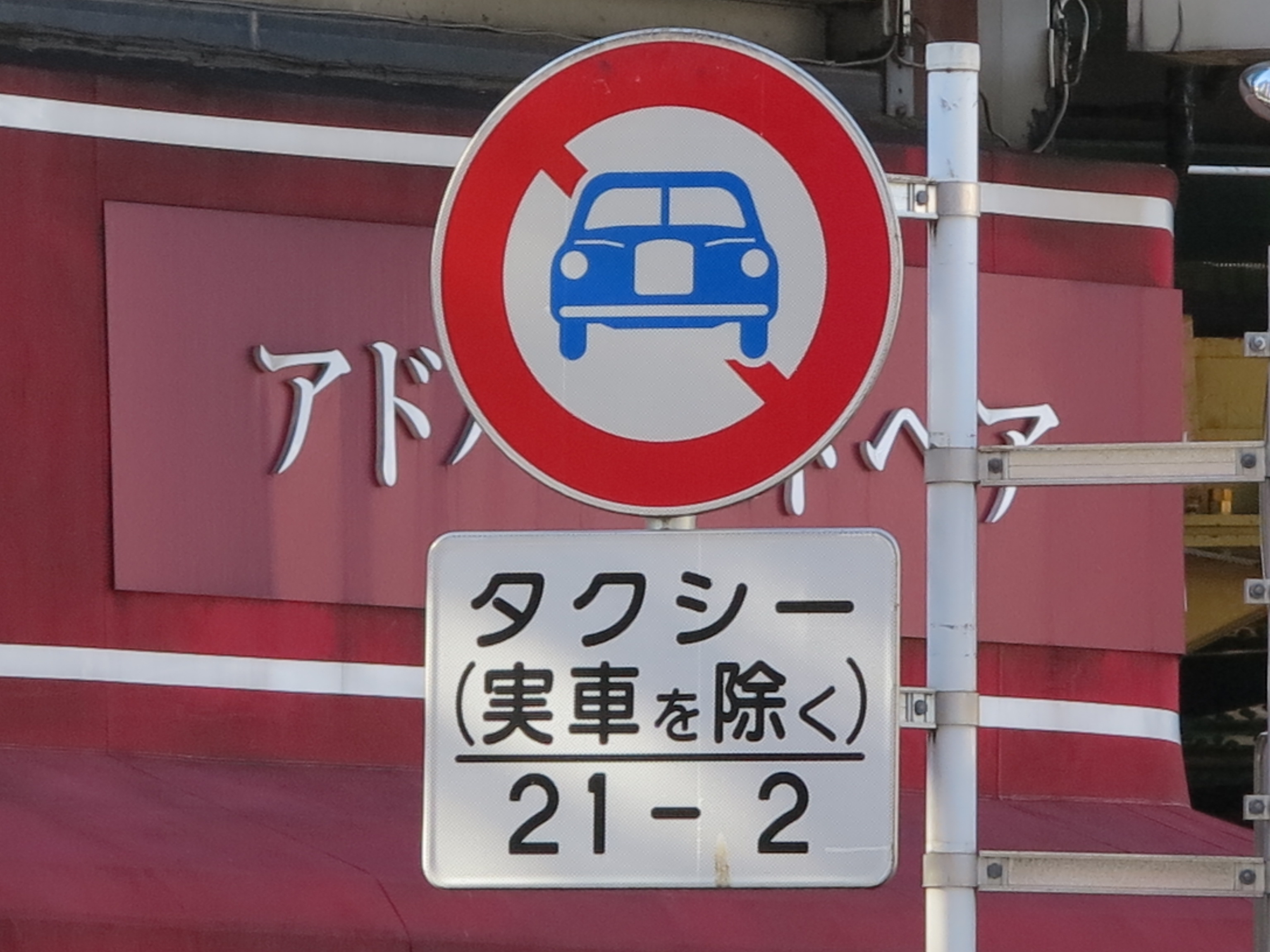
Taxis without any passengers can not enter from 9 p.m. until 2 a.m.

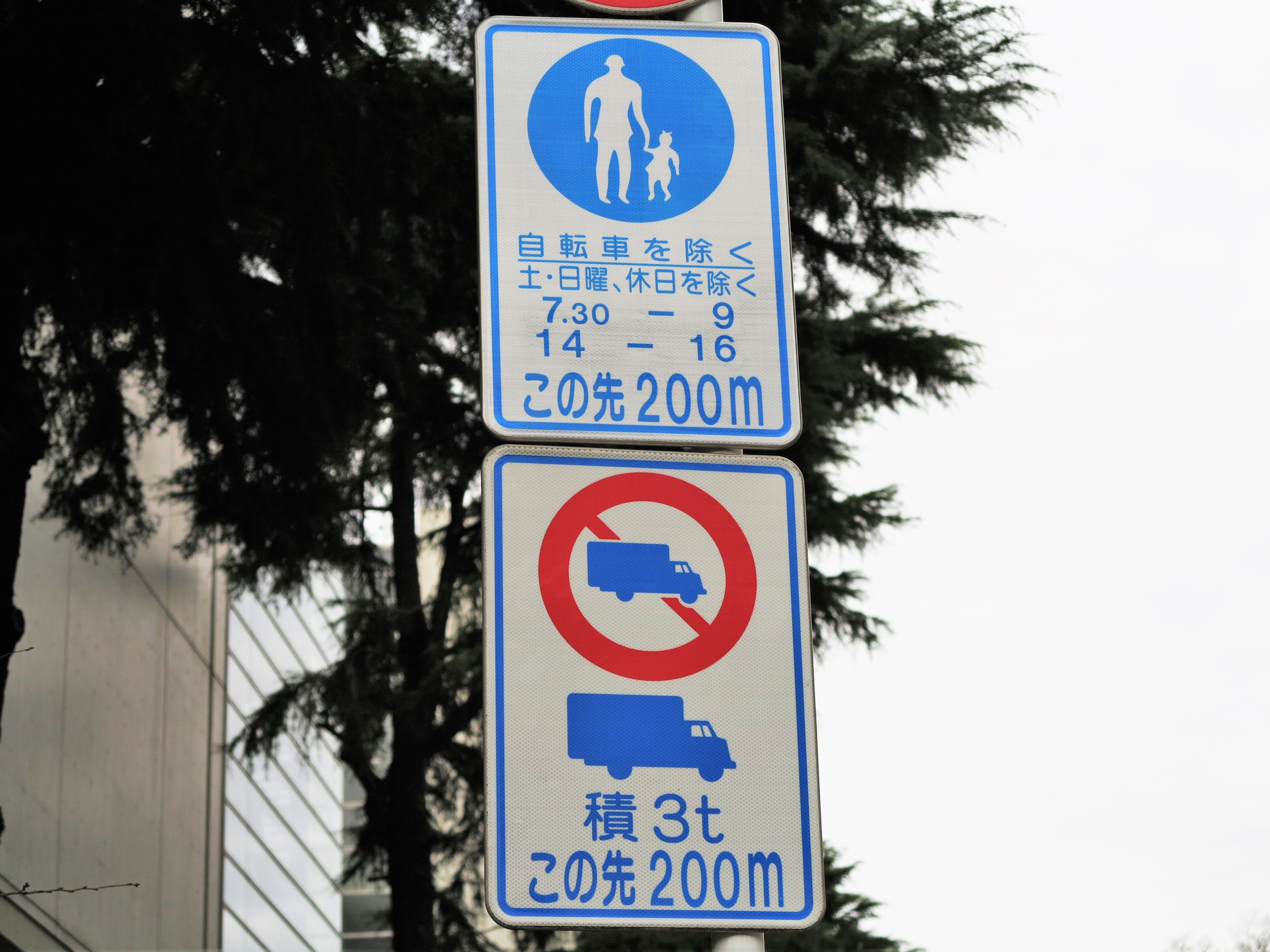
Restrictions 200 m ahead

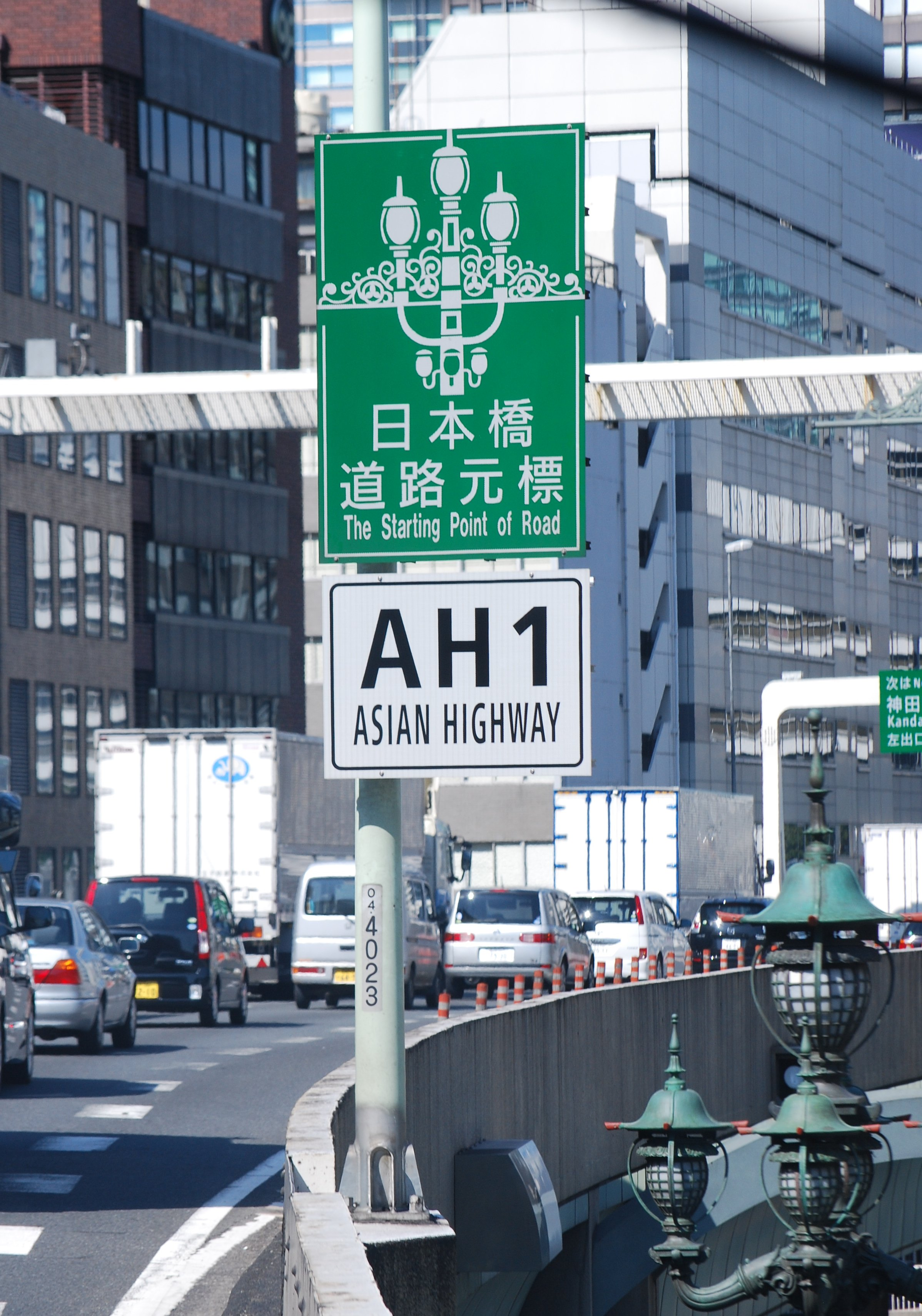
Asian highway sign and symbol of Nihonbashi (Shuto Expressway)

== Bibliography ==
- 時崎賢二 (1979). "道路標識等の基礎知識". 月刊交通. 10 (5). 東京法令出版: 18–29.
- 時崎賢二 (1990). "道路標識の国際化". 月刊交通. 21 (4). 東京法令出版: 19–39.
- dark-RX (2008-03-20). "見つけよう! 旧標識". 酷道をゆく. イカロス出版: 104–107. ISBN 978-4-86320-025-8.
- 全国道路標識標示業協会（編） (2013). 道路標識ハンドブック (2012年度版 ed.). 全国道路標識・標示業協会.
- 警察庁交通局 (2017-04-24). "交通規制基準" (PDF). 警察庁.
- "道路標識、区画線及び道路標示に関する命令 別表第２". www.mlit.go.jp. Archived from the original on 2017-10-14.
- "17062814_ichiran（止まれ、徐行正式版追加）" (PDF). www.mlit.go.jp (PDF). 2017-06-28.
