= Road signs in Finland =

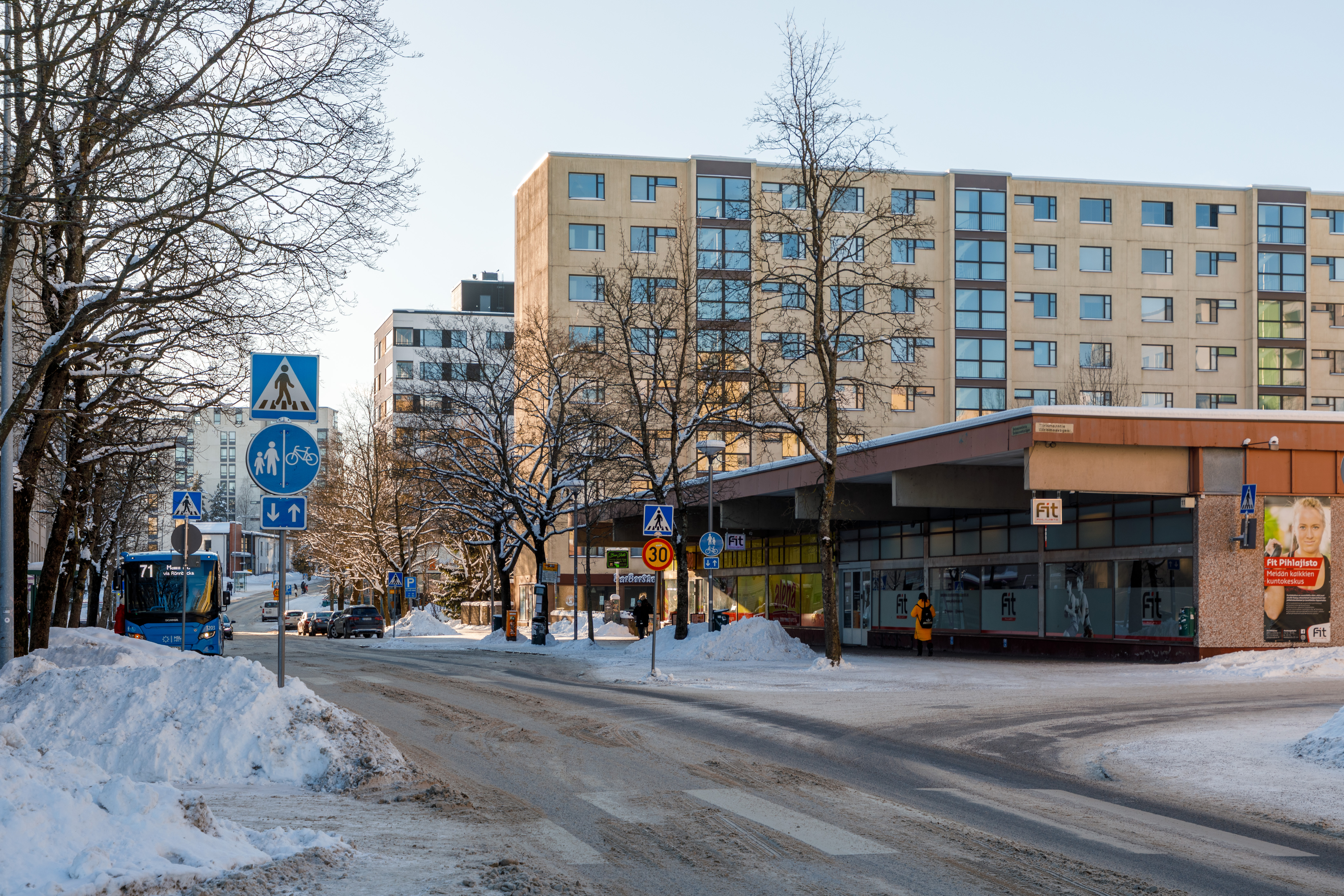
New road signs in Pihlajisto, Helsinki.

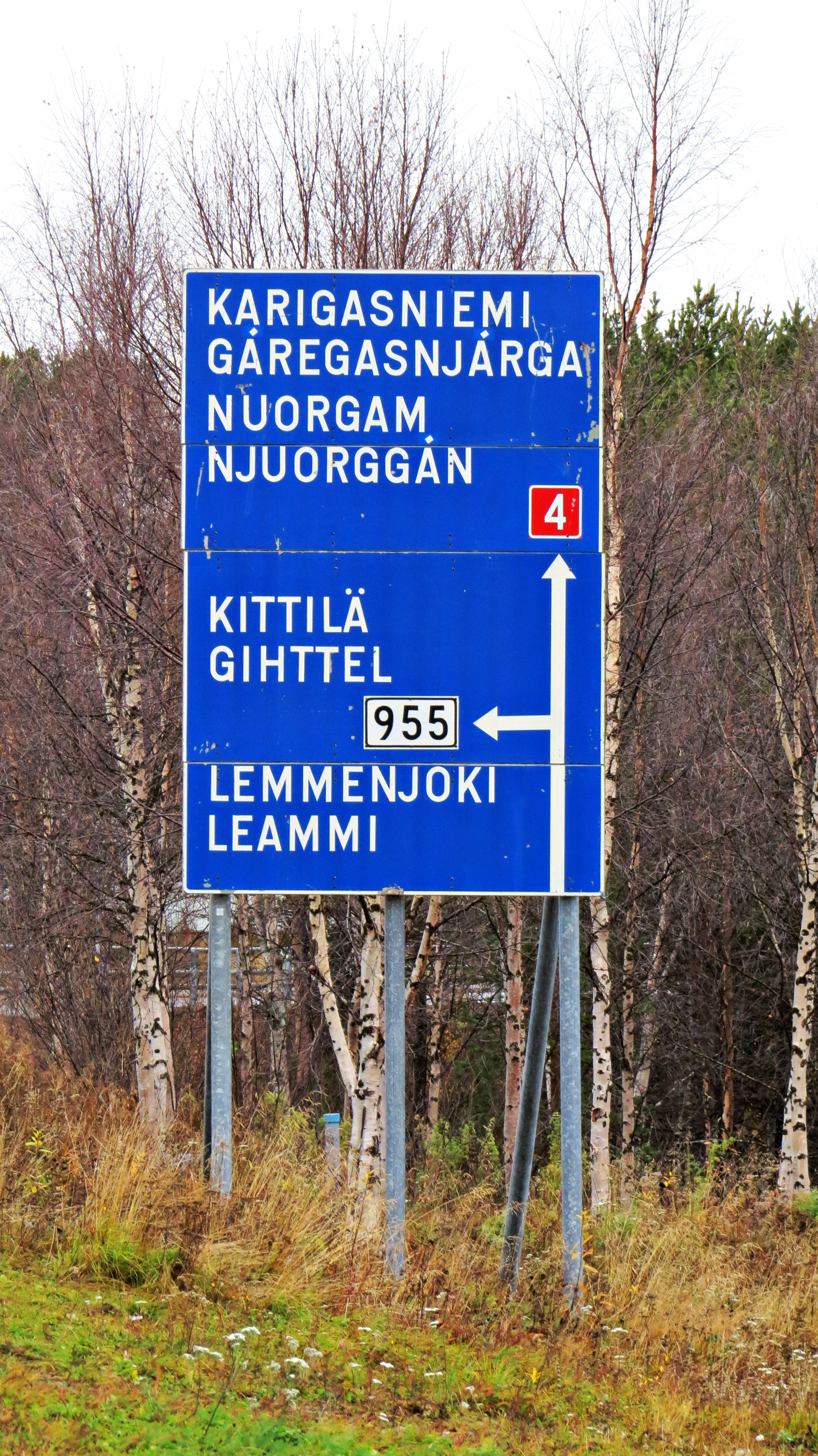
Bilingual direction sign, in Finnish and Northern Sami

Road signs in Finland were formerly regulated in the Road Traffic Regulation (5.3.1982/182) (Finnish: Tieliikenneasetus), but now are currently regulated in the Road Traffic Act (8.5.2020/360) (Finnish: Tieliikennelaki).

Most signs are based on pictograms, except signs like the prohibition-sign for stop at customs and the sign indicating a taxi rank. If the sign includes text, the text is written in Finnish or Swedish, except the stop sign and taxi signs which are written in English (some taxi signs are written TAKSI in Finnish). Many roads and places in Finland have Finnish and Swedish names, so both are marked on the traffic signs. This is common in the Swedish-speaking areas on the southern and western coasts, whereas in the inland Swedish names are far less common. In northern Lapland there are also traffic signs in the Northern Sámi, Skolt Sámi and Inari Sámi languages.

At many unregulated intersections the practice is to yield to traffic on-coming from the right, unless there is a "yield" or "give way" sign posted for the right on-coming traffic. This can be a problem on some streets since these signs are not always visible to traffic that does not have to yield. Therefore, unless a driver is experienced with the area and its signs, they are expected to give way to the right at an intersection, even if the road they are on appears to be the priority road.

Finnish road signs depict gender-neutral people with stylized silhouettes since 2020; between 1982 and 2020, the designs were realistic, as was common in most Nordic countries at the time. Since the last legal reform, most of the pictograms and arrows are identical to their German counterparts, whereas the new diagrams for people are similar to the Danish models.

In addition, Åland, an autonomous region of Finland, has some in Swedish-style signs and all are written in the Swedish language.

Finland signed the Vienna Convention on Road Signs and Signals on December 16, 1969 and ratified it on April 1, 1985.

== Major differences between Finnish and general European signs ==
Whereas European signs usually have white background on warning and prohibition signs, Finnish signs have a yellow/orange colour. This is for the purpose of enhancing the visibility of the sign during the winter, as white signs would be hard to see in the snow. Prohibition signs displaying a symbol other than a numeric value have a diagonal red line across them. Prohibition signs in Iceland and Sweden are similar in this respect. In most European countries, however, such signs do not usually include a red line.

== Warning signs ==
Warning signs are triangular, but in contrast to those of most other states using triangular warning signs, Finnish signs have yellow backgrounds, rather than white.

Dangerous curve to right
(formerly used)

Dangerous curve to left
(formerly used)

Dangerous curves, first bend to right
(formerly used)

Dangerous curves, first bend to left
(formerly used)

Steep hill upwards
(formerly used)

Steep hill downwards
(formerly used)

Road narrows on both sides

Two-way traffic
(formerly used)

Opening or swing bridge
(formerly used)

Quayside or ferry berth
(formerly used)

Queuing traffic
(formerly used)

Uneven road ahead

Speed bumps
(formerly used)

Road works
(formerly used)

Loose chippings
(formerly used)

Slippery road
(formerly used)

Dangerous shoulders
(formerly used)

Pedestrian crossing
(formerly used)

Pedestrians

Children
(formerly used)

Cyclists and moped riders on carriageway
(formerly used)

Skiers crossing
(formerly used)

Animals (Elk)

Animals (Reindeer)

Animals (Deer)

Intersection, equal (rightside has the priority)

Junction with a minor road
(formerly used)

Junction with a minor road
(formerly used)

Junction with a minor road
(formerly used)

Junction with a minor road
(formerly used)

Traffic signals

Roundabout warning
(formerly used)

Tramway

Level crossing without gates

Level crossing with gates

Distance to level crossing

Distance to level crossing

Distance to level crossing

Single track level crossing

Multitrack level crossing

Falling rocks
(formerly used)

Low-flying aircraft

Crosswind
(formerly used)

Other dangers

== Priority signs ==
Priority road

End of priority road

Priority over oncoming vehicles
(formerly used)

Priority for oncoming vehicles
(formerly used)

Give way

Stop

Cycle crossing

== Prohibitory signs ==
Prohibitory signs are round with yellow backgrounds and red borders, except the no parking and no standing signs that have a blue background instead of yellow.

Closed to all vehicles in both directions

No power-driven vehicles
(formerly used)

No lorries
(formerly used)

No combinations of a vehicle and a trailer
(formerly used)

No tractors, construction vehicles etc.
(formerly used)

No motorcycles
(formerly used)

No off-road vehicles
(formerly used)

No vehicles carrying dangerous goods

No buses

No mopeds
(formerly used)

No cycles
(formerly used)

No cycles or mopeds

No pedestrians
(formerly used)

No pedestrians or cycles
(formerly used)

No equestrians
(formerly used)

No entry

No left turn
(formerly used)

No right turn
(formerly used)

No U-turn
(formerly used)

No vehicles having an overall width exceeding [...] meters
(formerly used)

No vehicles having an overall height exceeding [...] meters
(formerly used)

No vehicles or combination of vehicles exceeding [...] meters
(formerly used)

No vehicles exceeding [...] tonnes laden weight

No vehicles or combination of vehicles exceeding [...] tonnes laden weight or bearing capacity class
(formerly used)

No vehicles having a weight exceeding [...] tonnes on one axle
(formerly used)

No vehicles having a weight exceeding [...] tonnes on a tandem axle
(formerly used)

No overtaking
(formerly used)

End of overtaking restriction
(formerly used)

No overtaking by lorries
(formerly used)

End of overtaking by lorries restriction
(formerly used)

Speed limit

End of speed limit
(formerly used)

Speed limit zone

End of speed limit zone
(formerly used)

Prohibition or restriction applying to one or more traffic lanes
(formerly used)

No standing or parking
(formerly used)

No parking
(formerly used)

No parking zone
(formerly used)

End of no parking zone
(formerly used)

Taxi waiting zone
(formerly used)

Taxi stopping zone
(formerly used)

Loading zone

Loading zone

Alternative parking (prohibited on the odd days of month from 08:00 on that day until 08:00 on the next)
(formerly used)

Alternative parking (prohibited on the even days of month from 08:00 on that day until 08:00 on the next)
(formerly used)

Passing without stopping prohibited (customs control on Russian border)

Passing without stopping prohibited (customs control on Swedish border)

Passing without stopping prohibited (customs control on Norwegian border)

Passing without stopping prohibited (police control)
(formerly used)

Minimum distance between power driven vehicles
(formerly used)

Vehicles equipped with studded tyres prohibited

== Mandatory signs ==
Mandatory signs are always round blue signs with white border.

Direction to be followed (turn right only)
(formerly used)

Direction to be followed (turn left only)
(formerly used)

Direction to be followed (straight ahead only)
(formerly used)

Direction to be followed (turn right ahead)
(formerly used)

Direction to be followed (turn left ahead)
(formerly used)

Direction to be followed (turn right or continue straight ahead)
(formerly used)

Direction to be followed (turn left or continue straight ahead)
(formerly used)

Direction to be followed (turn left or right)
(formerly used)

Direction to be followed (proceed in any direction)

Compulsory roundabout
(formerly used)

Pass this side (right side)
(formerly used)

Pass this side (left side)
(formerly used)

Pass either side
(formerly used)

Footpath
(formerly used)

Cycleway
(formerly used)

Compulsory track for pedestrians and cyclists
(formerly used)

Compulsory track for pedestrians and cyclists (dual track)
(formerly used)

Compulsory track for pedestrians and cyclists (dual track)
(formerly used)

Track for off-road vehicles
(formerly used)

Track for rider on horseback
(formerly used)

Minimum speed limit

End of minimum speed limit

== Special regulation signs ==
Pedestrian crossing
(formerly used)

Park and ride

Park and ride

Park and ride

Park and ride

Park and ride

Parking

Placing vehicles on a parking place

Placing vehicles on a parking place

Placing vehicles on a parking place

Passing place (on narrow roads)
(formerly used)

Bus stop
(formerly used for local traffic and for long-distance traffic)

Tramway stop
(formerly used )

Taxi station

Bus lane (sign above the line)

Bus and taxi lane (sign above the line)

End of bus lane (sign above the line)
(formerly used)

End of bus and taxi lane (sign above the line)
(formerly used)

Tramway lane (sign above the line)

Tramway and taxi lane (sign above the line)

End of tramway lane (sign above the line)
(formerly used)

End of tramway and taxi lane (sign above the lane)
(formerly used)

Cycle lane (sign above the line)

Cycle lane (sign above the line)

One-way traffic

One-way traffic
(formerly used )

Motorway

End of motorway (formerly used)

Road for motor vehicles (formerly used)

End of road for motor vehicles (formerly used)

Tunnel

End of tunnel
(formerly used)

Emergency stopping place
(formerly used)

Built-up area

End of built-up area

Residential area
(formerly used)

End of residential area
(formerly used)

Pedestrian zone
(formerly used)

End of pedestrian zone
(formerly used)

Cycle street

End of cycle street

== Information signs ==
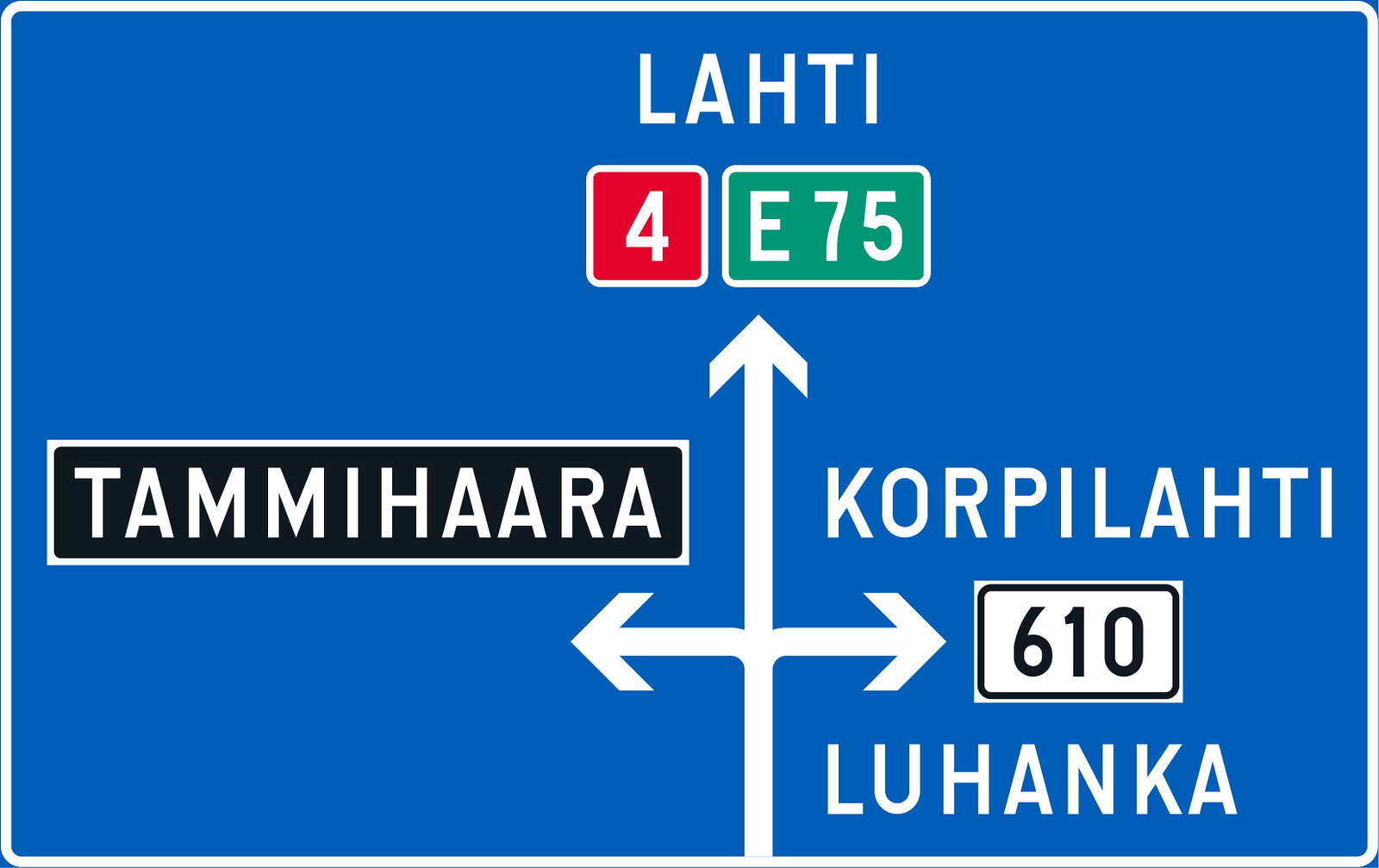
Advance direction sign (type A)

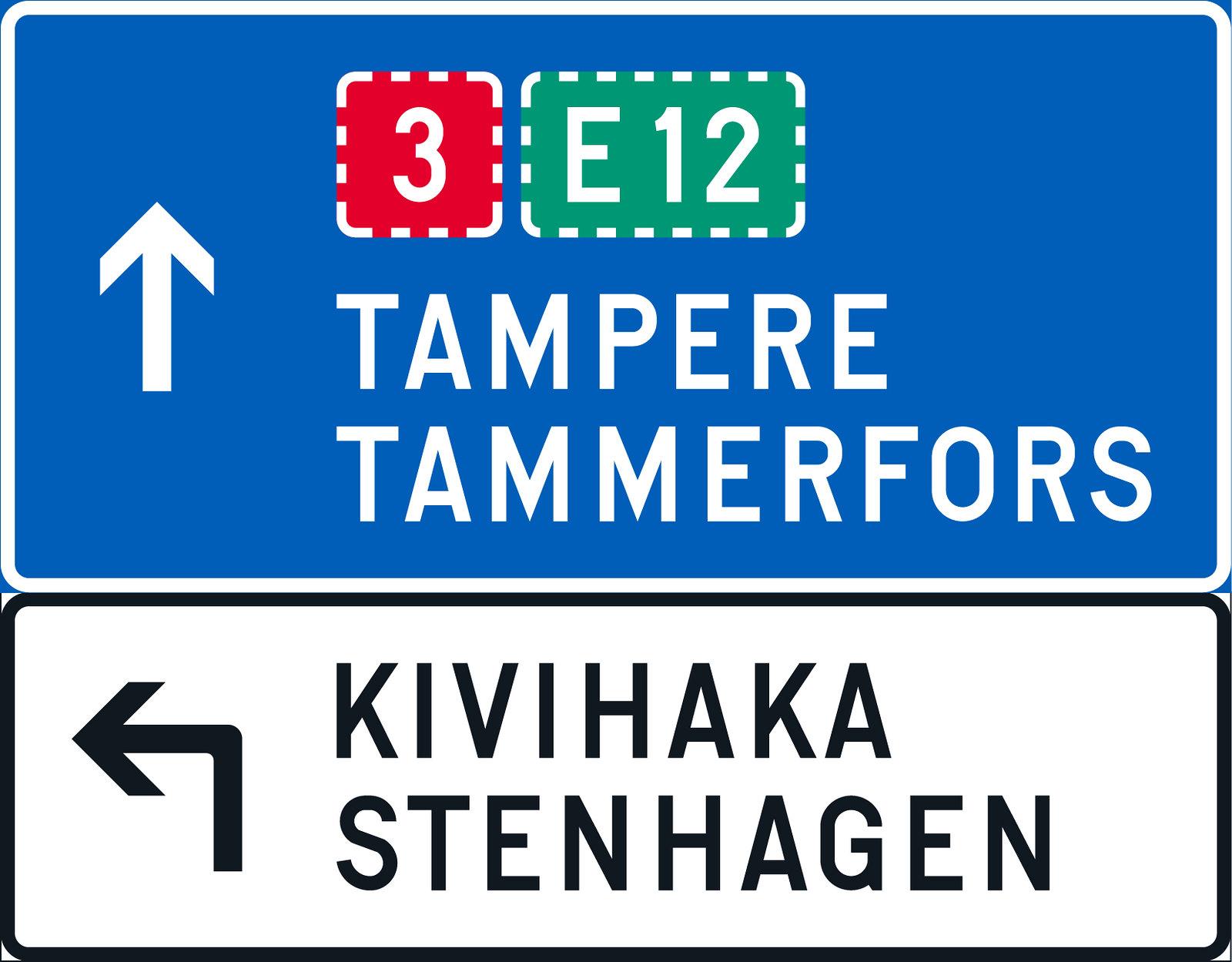
Advance direction sign (type B)

Advisory sign for detour
(formerly used)

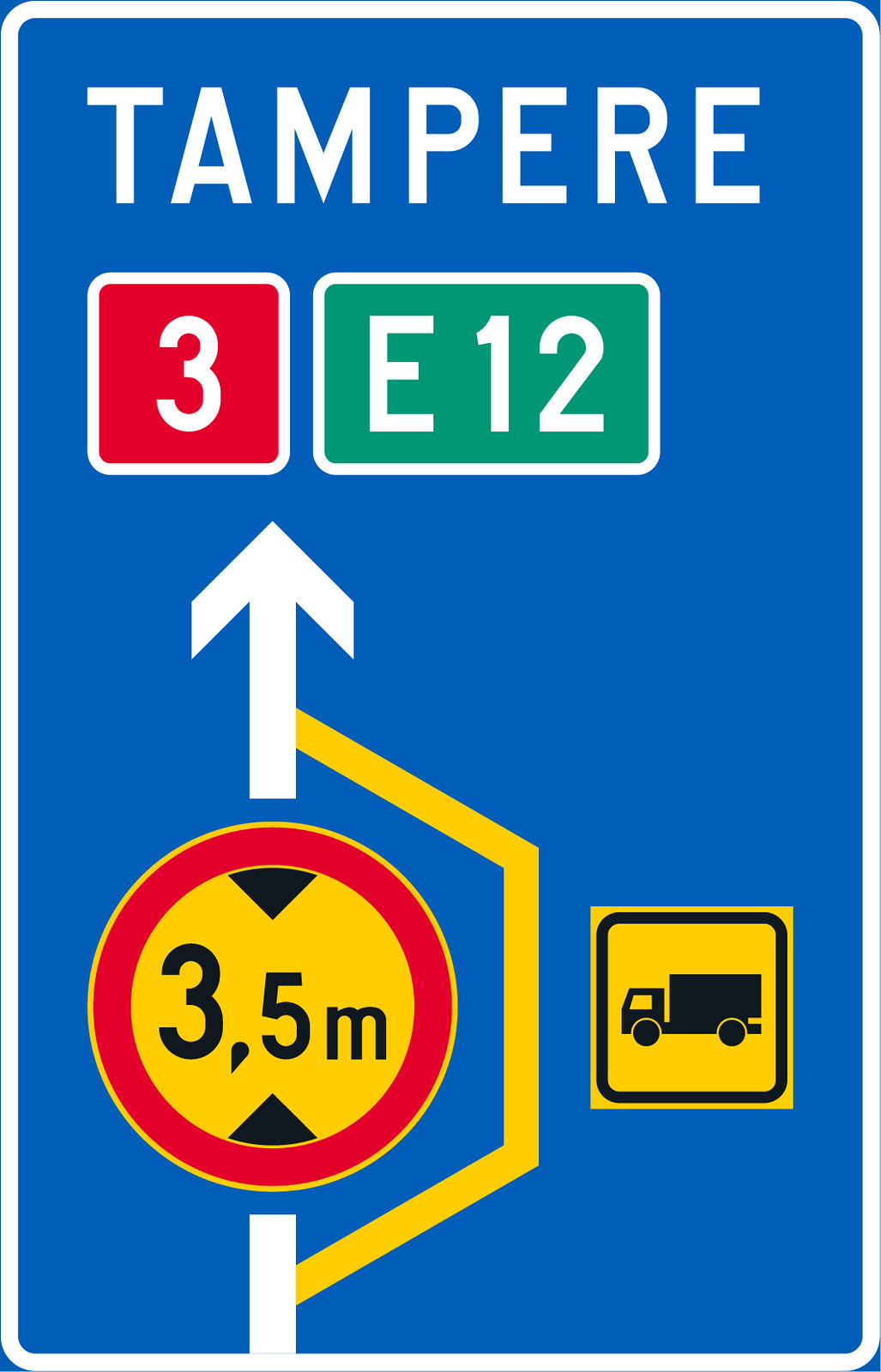
Advisory sign for detour

Detour

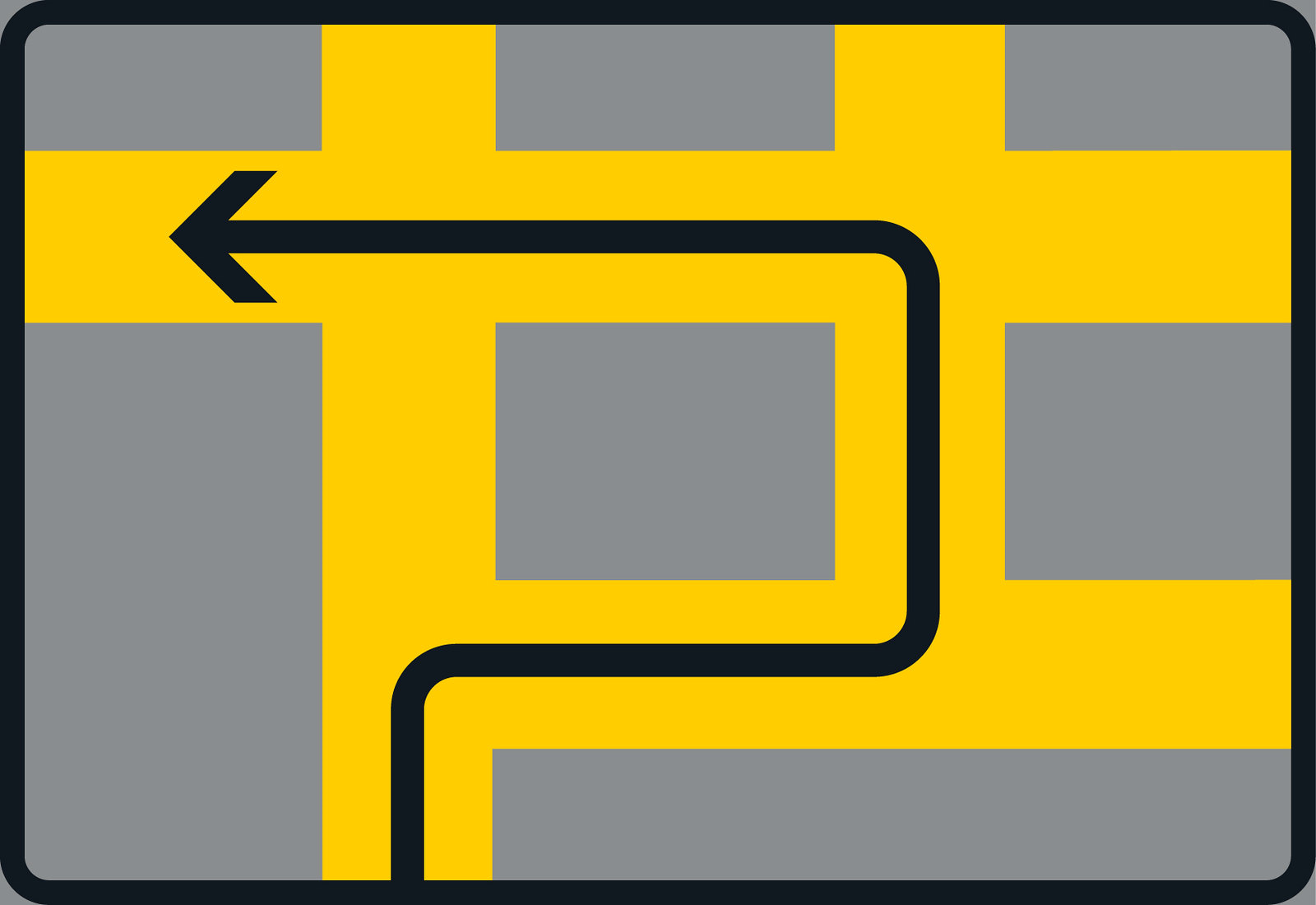
Route to be followed (in order to turn left)

Information on traffic lanes
(formerly used)

Information on traffic lanes
(formerly used)

Information on traffic lanes
(formerly used)

Information on traffic lanes

Information on traffic lanes

Information on traffic lanes

End of lane
(formerly used)

End of lane
(formerly used)

Advance direction sign (above the lane; type A)

Advance direction sign (above the lane; type B)

Exit sign (above the lane)

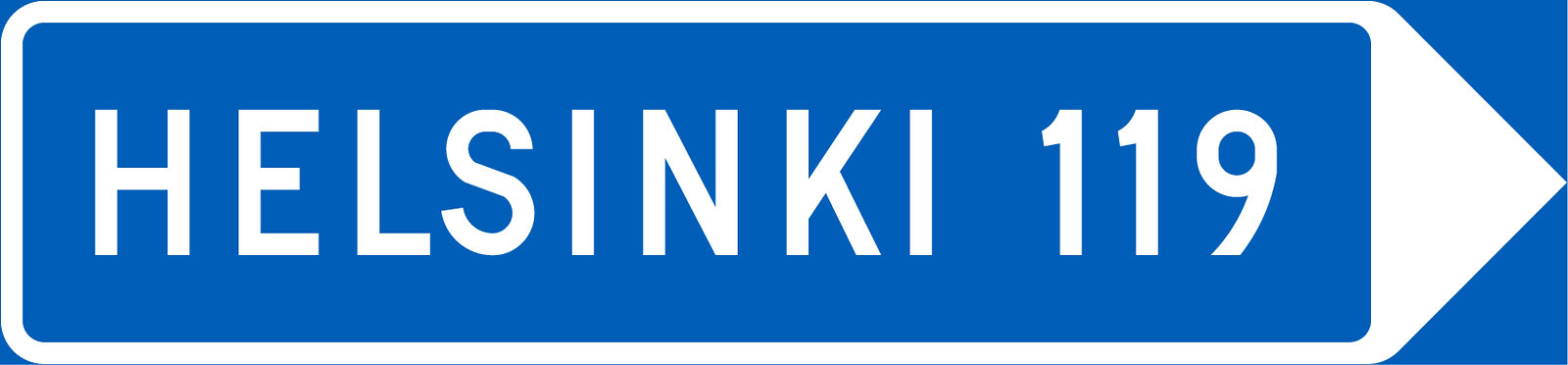
Direction sign

Exit sign

Direction sign on private road

Location sign

Advance location sign

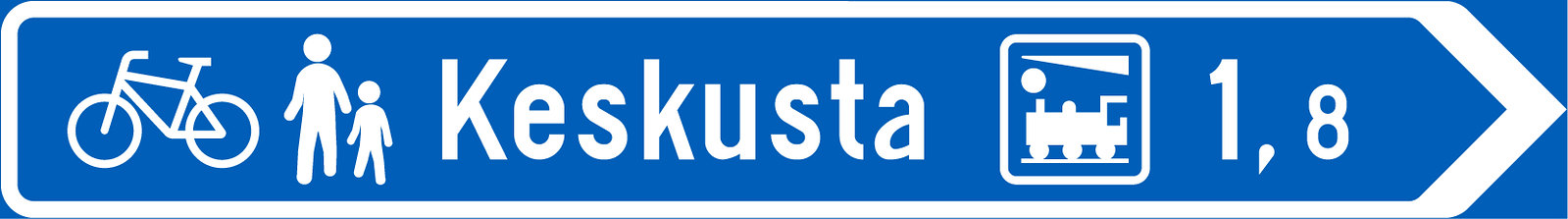
Direction sign for light traffic (pedestrian and cycle traffic)

Direction sign for detour

Direction sign for detour

Direction sign for local purposes

Direction sign showing a motorway or road for motor vehicles

Direction sign showing park-and-ride facilities

No through road

No through road

No through road
(formerly used)

Advisory speed

Sign showing distances

Place name
(formerly used )

Place name (waterway)

Road number (E-road; European route)

Road number (primary road; main road, Class I; 1–39)

Road number (secondary road; main road, Class II; 40–99)

Road number (regional road; 100–999)

Road number (ordinary road; connecting road; 1000–9999)

Road number (ring road)

Direction to the numbered road

Symbol of motorway
(formerly used)

Symbol of road for motor vehicles
(formerly used)

Airport

Ferry

Passenger terminal

Cargo terminal

Freight terminal

Industrial area
(formerly used)

Retail park

Parking
(formerly used)

Parking garage
(formerly used)

Railway station

Bus station

City Centre symbol

Itinerary for indicated vehicle category
(formerly used)

Itinerary for pedestrians
(formerly used)

Itinerary for handicapped

Itinerary for transport of dangerous goods
(formerly used)

Overpass or underpass with steps (formerly used)

Overpass or underpass without steps (formerly used)

Emergency exit

Direction to emergency exit

== Service signs ==
Information sign for services

Information sign for services

Advance information sign for services

Location sign for tourist service

Advance location sign for tourist service

Radio station (frequency in MHz)

Information point
(formerly used)

Information centre
(formerly used)

First-aid
(formerly used)

Breakdown service
(formerly used)

Gasoline station
(formerly used)

Gasoline station (with compressed natural gas)

Electric vehicle charging station

Petrol station (with hydrogen)

Hotel or motel
(formerly used)

Restaurant
(formerly used)

Cafeteria or refreshments
(formerly used)

Public lavatory
(formerly used)

Youth hostel
(formerly used)

Camping site
(formerly used)

Caravan site
(formerly used)

Picnic site
(formerly used)

Recreational area
(formerly used)

Emergency telephone
(formerly used)

Extinguisher
(formerly used)

Museum or historic building
(formerly used)

World Heritage Site
(formerly used)

Nature site
(formerly used)

Viewpoint
(formerly used)

Zoo
(formerly used)

Other tourist attraction
(formerly used)

Swimming place
(formerly used)

Fishing place
(formerly used)

Ski lift
(formerly used)

Cross-country skiing centre

Golf course
(formerly used)

Pleasure or theme park
(formerly used)

Cottage accommodation
(formerly used)

Bed and breakfast
(formerly used)

Direct sale
(formerly used)

Handicrafts
(formerly used)

Farm park
(formerly used)

Horseback riding
(formerly used)

Tourist route
(formerly used)

Tourist route
(formerly used)

== Additional panels ==
Sign applies to crossing road
(formerly used)

Sign applies in the direction of the arrow
(formerly used)

Sign applies [...] km in the direction of the arrow
(formerly used)

Sign applies [...] km in the direction of the arrow

Distance to which the sign applies
(formerly used)

Distance from the sign to the point to which the sign applies
(formerly used)

Distance to the compulsory stop
(formerly used)

Free width
(formerly used)

Free height
(formerly used)

Height of electric line
(formerly used)

Sign applies to both directions
(formerly used)

Sign applies to both directions
(formerly used)

Sign applies in the direction of the arrow
(formerly used)

Regulation begins from the sign
(formerly used)

Regulation ends to the sign
(formerly used)

Private vehicle
(formerly used)

Bus
(formerly used)

Truck
(formerly used)

Delivery van
(formerly used)

Caravan
(formerly used)

Camper van

Vehicle for handicapped
(formerly used)

Motorcycle
(formerly used)

Moped
(formerly used)

Pedal cycle
(formerly used)

Snowmobiles

Tractors

Low-emission vehicles

Method of parking (formerly used)

Method of parking (formerly used)

No entry for vehicles carrying dangerous goods of group A

No entry for vehicles carrying dangerous goods of group B

Tunnel class B

Tunnel class C

Tunnel class D

Tunnel class E

Sign applies between 08.00 and 17.00 hours, Mo-Fr
(formerly used)

Sign applies between 08.00 and 13.00 hours, on Saturdays
(formerly used)

Sign applies between 08.00 and 14.00 hours, on Sundays and holidays
(formerly used)

Time limit
(formerly used)

Obligatory use of parking disc
(formerly used)

Parking against fee
(formerly used)

Charging space for electric vehicles

Direction of priority road
(formerly used)

Direction of priority road
(formerly used)

Two-way cycle track
(formerly used)

Two-way path

Additional panel with text "Occasionally foggy"

Additional panel with text "Driving in service purposes allowed"
(formerly used)

Additional panel with text "Zone"

Additional panel with text "General limit"

Emergency telephone and extinguisher
(formerly used)

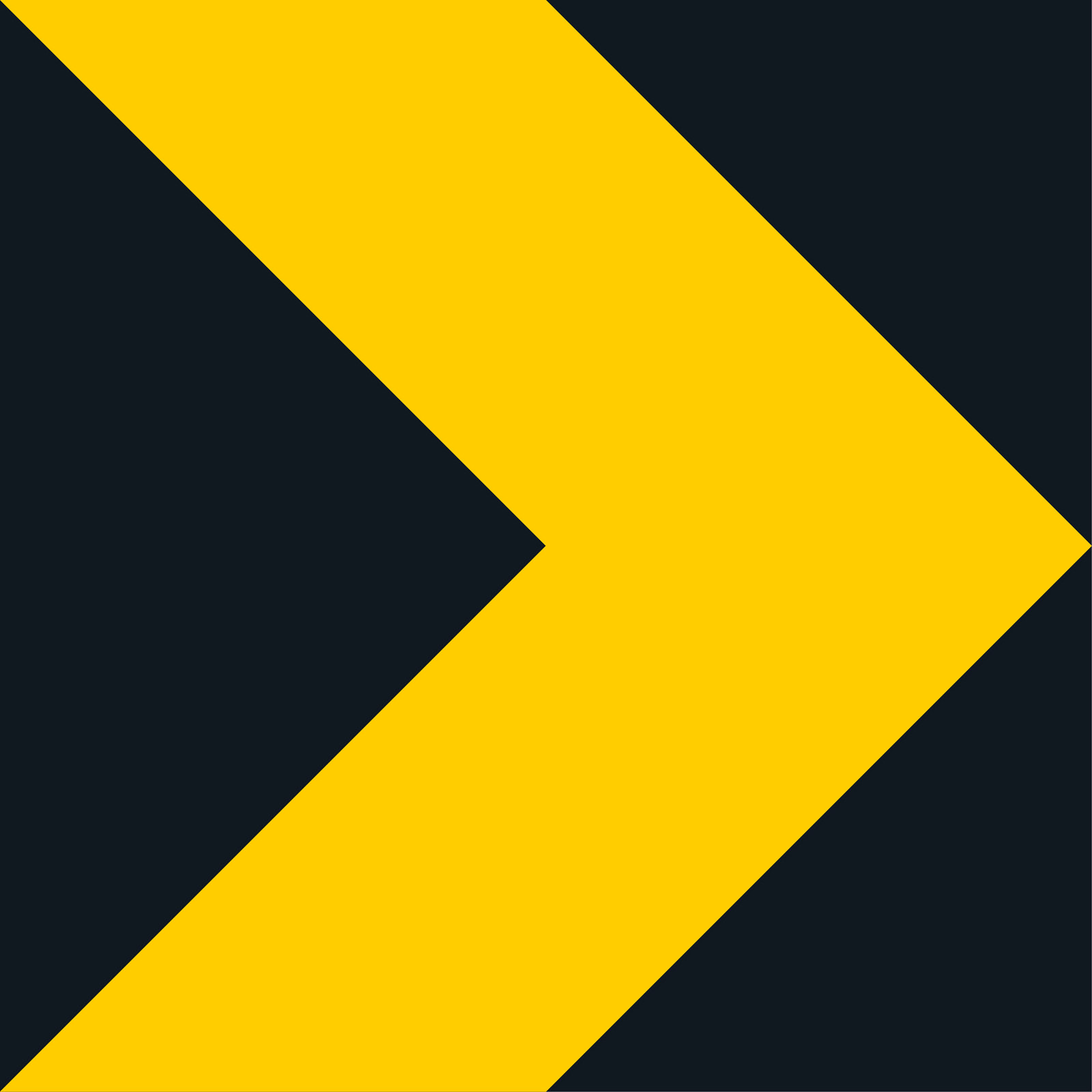
Sharp Curve

== Other signs ==
General speed limits

National border (Schengen area)

== Retired signs (no longer used) ==
Signs listed below have been withdrawn or replaced with new diagrams of the same meaning.

=== 1930 road signs ===
Danger

No entry

No vehicles

No parking

Mandatory direction

Parking

=== 1937 road signs ===
==== Warning signs ====
Danger

Uneven road

Crossroad

Series of bends

Level crossing with gates

Level crossing without gates

Yield

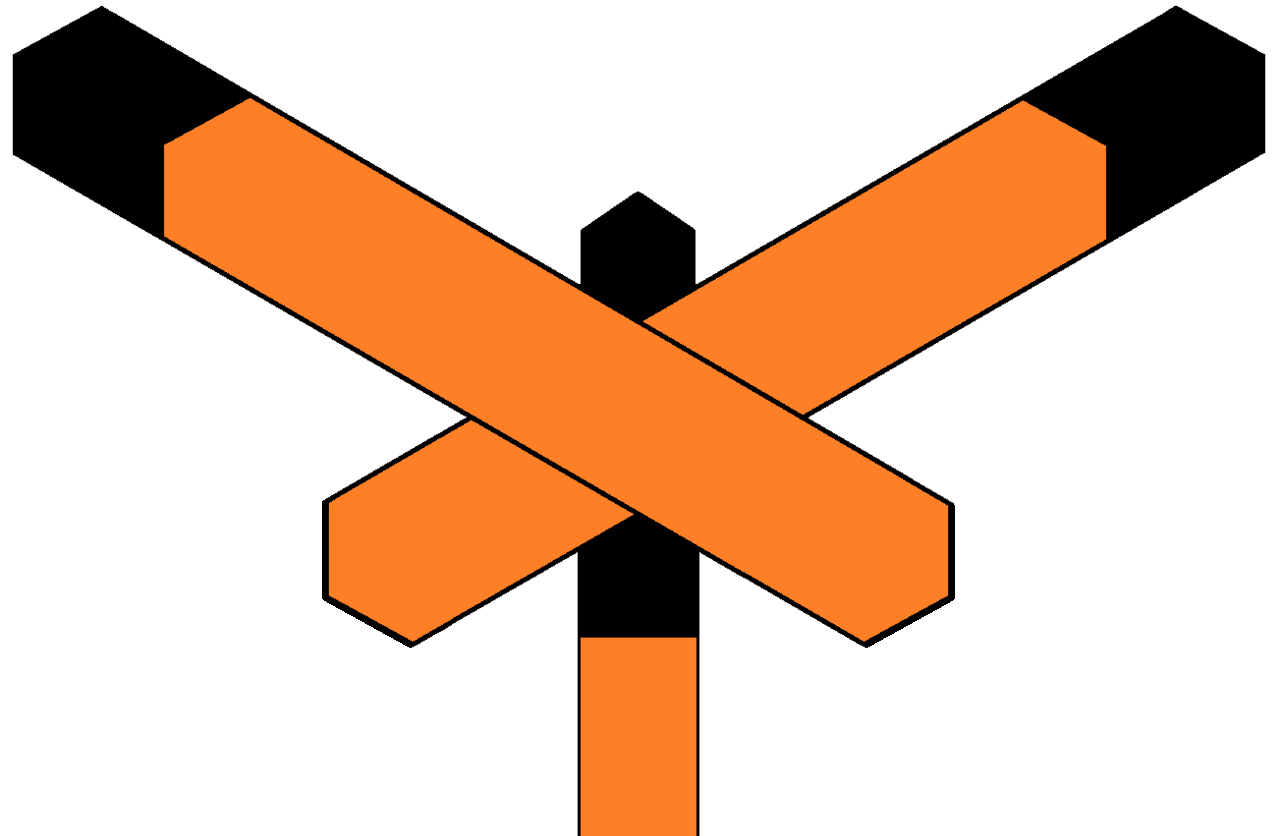
Level crossing front

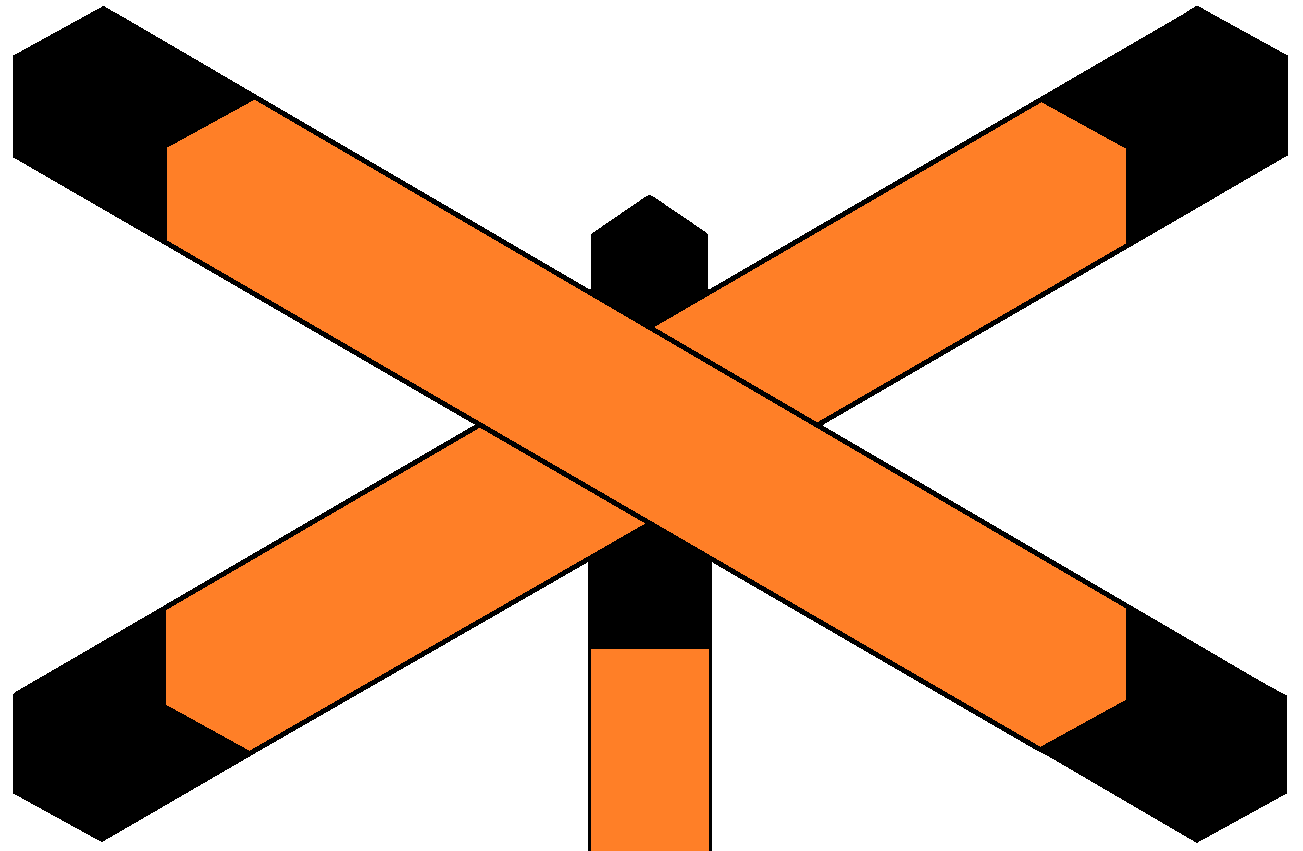
Single track level crossing

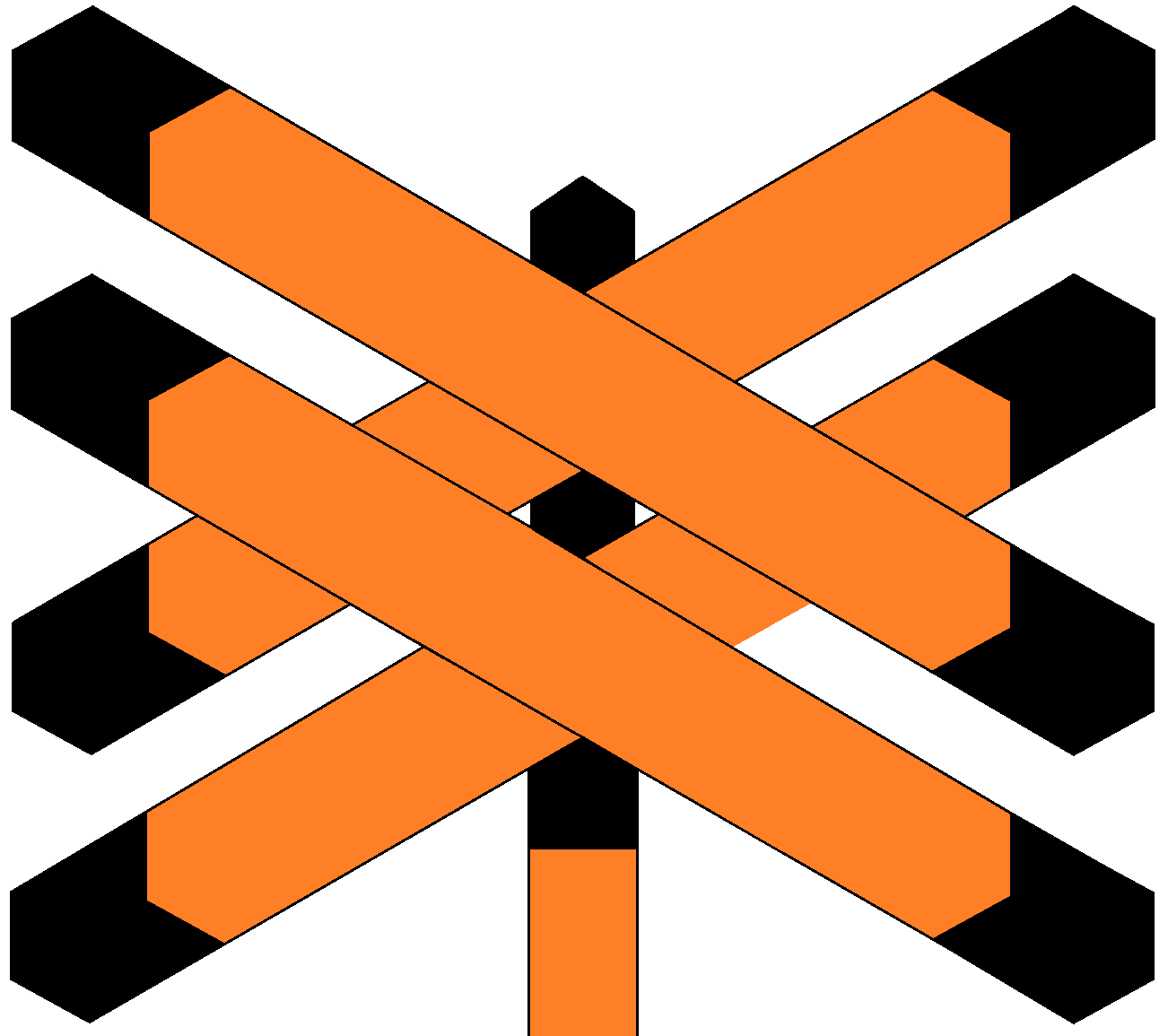
Multi track level crossing

Priority road (new sign in 1939)

Priority road ends (new sign in 1939)

==== Regulatory signs ====
No vehicles

Do not enter

No motor vehicles except motocycles

No motorcycles

No motor vehicles

Weight limit

Width limit

Speed limit

No stopping

No parking

No overtaking

No honking

Customs

Turn left

Turn right

Roundabout

==== Information signs ====
Parking

Caution

Passing place

First aid

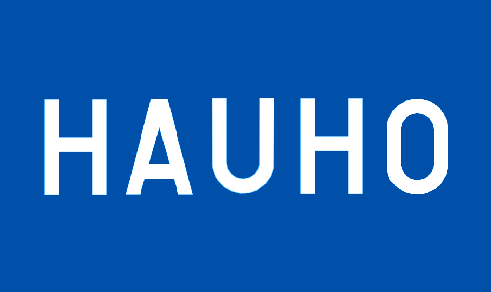
Urban area

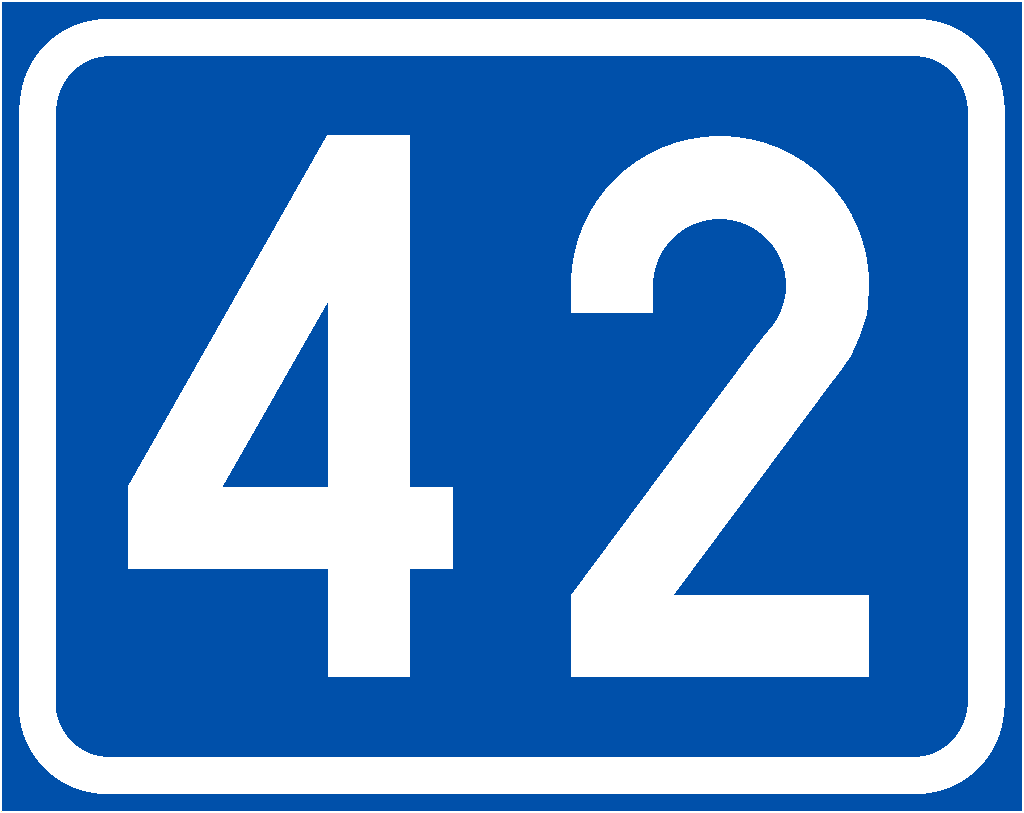
Route number

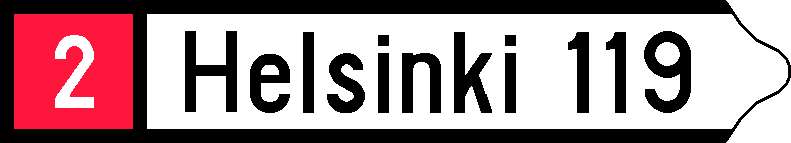
Highway direction sign

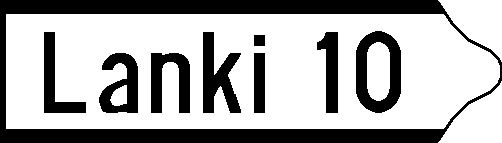
Direction sign

=== 1957 road signs ===
==== Warning signs ====
Uneven road

Series of bends

Crossroad

Road narrows

Opening bridge

Roadworks

Children

Tram crossing

Other danger

Railroad crosiing without gates

Railroad crosiing with gates

Countdown marker

Countdown marker

Countdown marker

Countdown marker

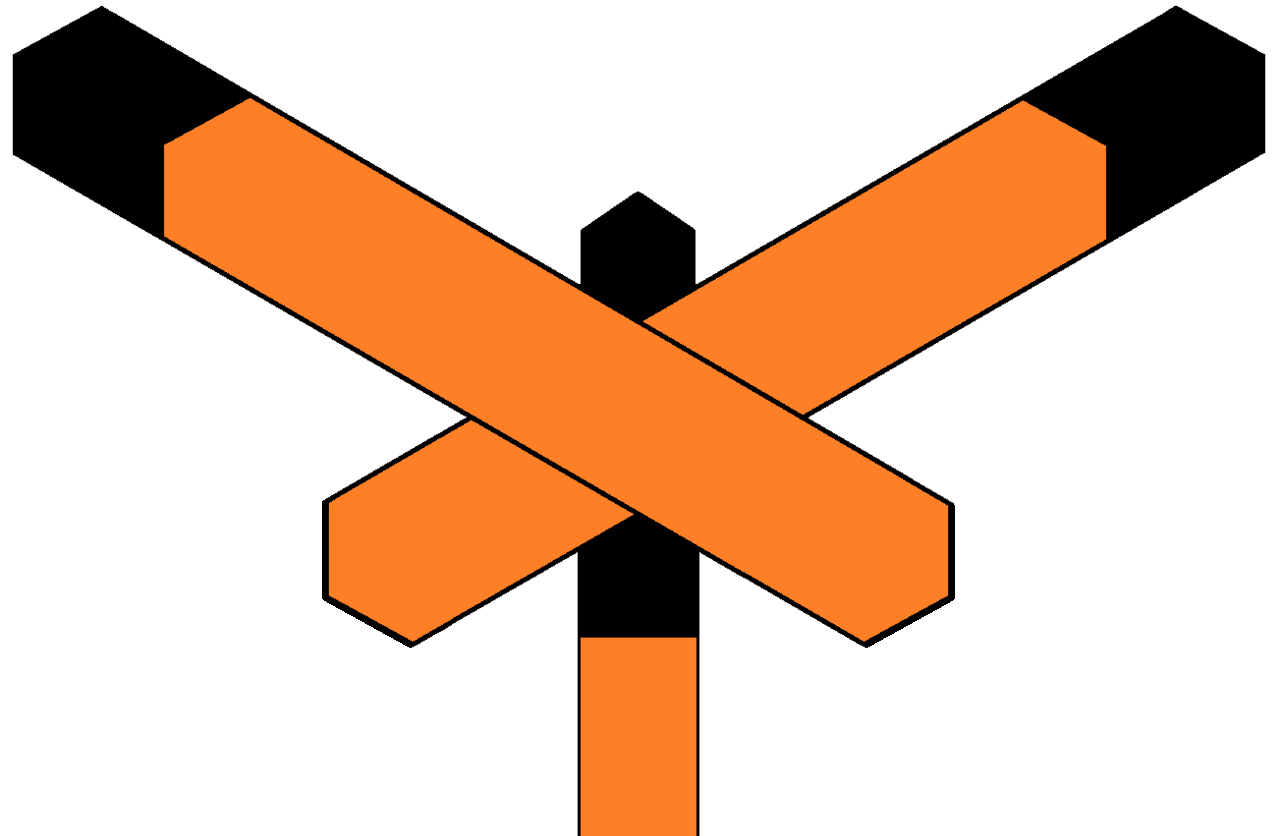
Level crossing front

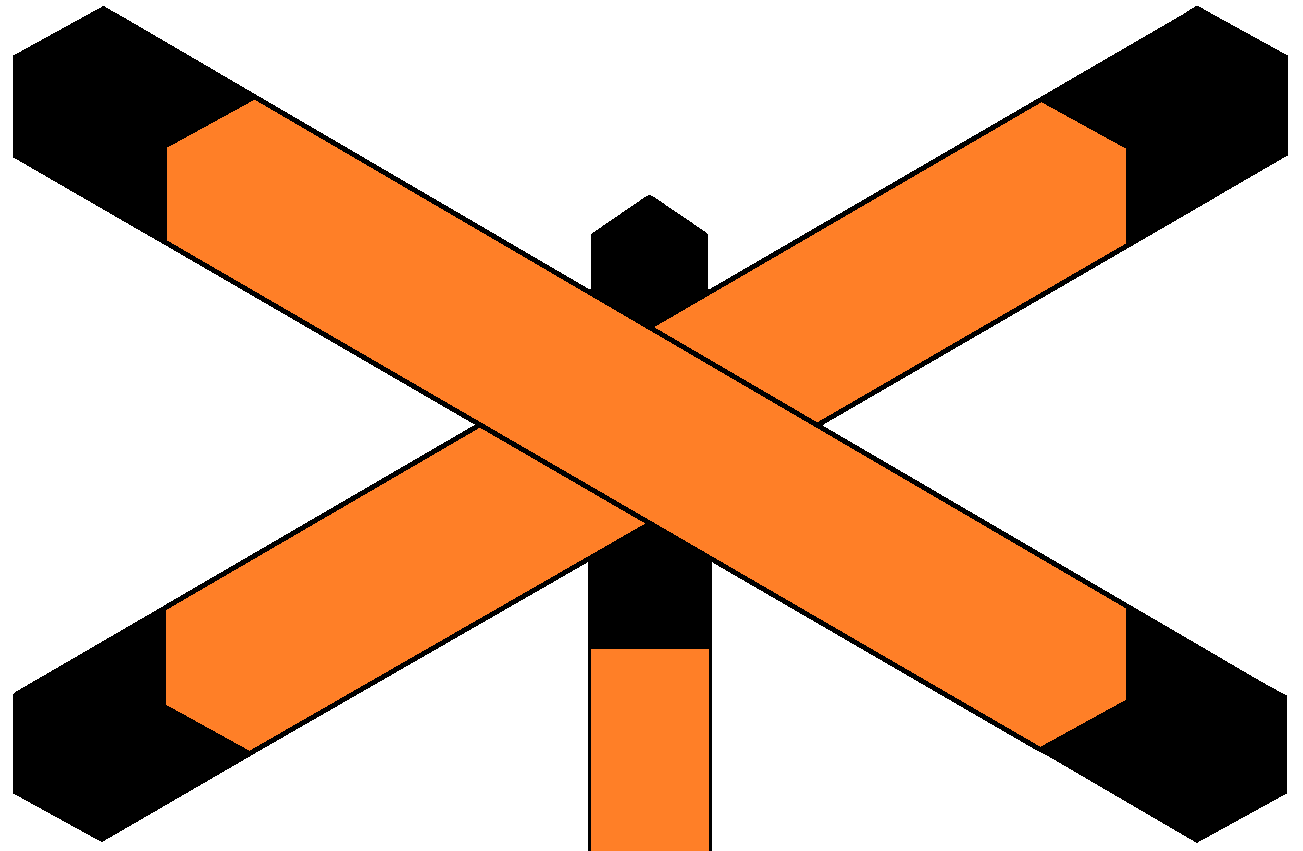
Single track level crossing

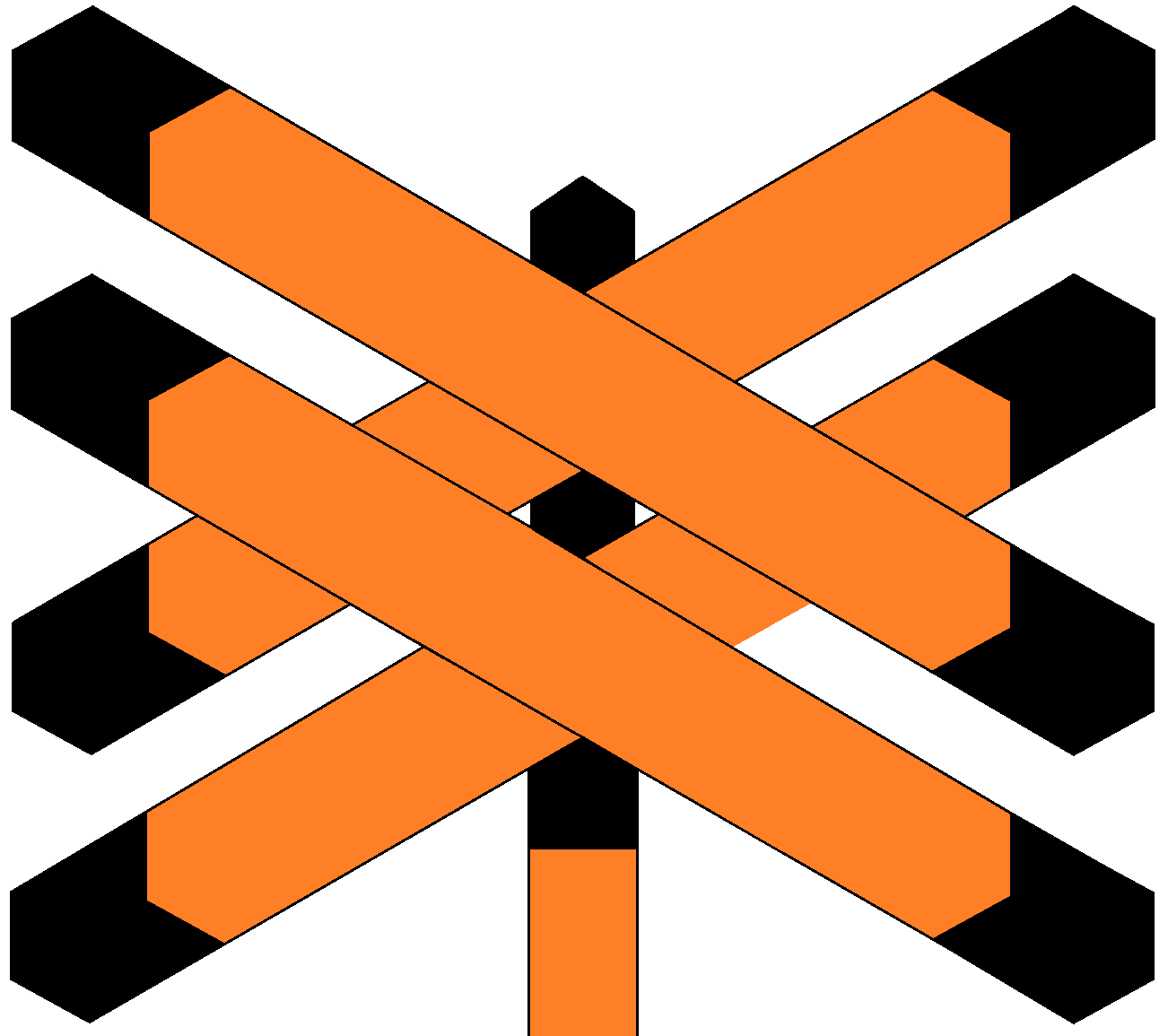
Multi track level crossing

==== Prohibitory signs ====
No vehicles

No entry

No right turn

No left turn

No overtaking

No motor vehicles

No motor vehicles except motorcycles

No goods vehicles

No motorcycles

No bicycles

No parking

No stopping

Weight limit

Axle load limit

Width limit

Height limit

Speed limit

Speed limit ends

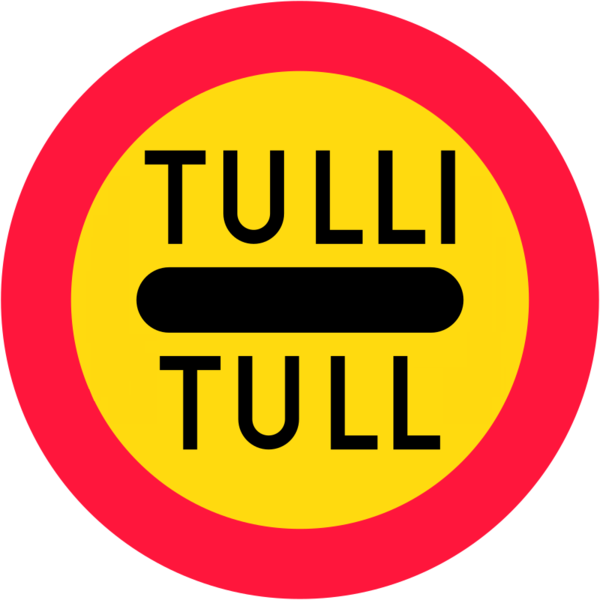
Customs

Give way

Stop

==== Mandatory signs ====
Turn right

Turn left

Keep right

Keep left

Keep right or left

Bicycle path

Footpath

==== Information signs ====
Priorty road

Priorty road ends

Lane direction (go straight)

Lane direction (turn left)

Lane direction (turn right)

Parking

Pedestrian crossing

Telephone

First aid

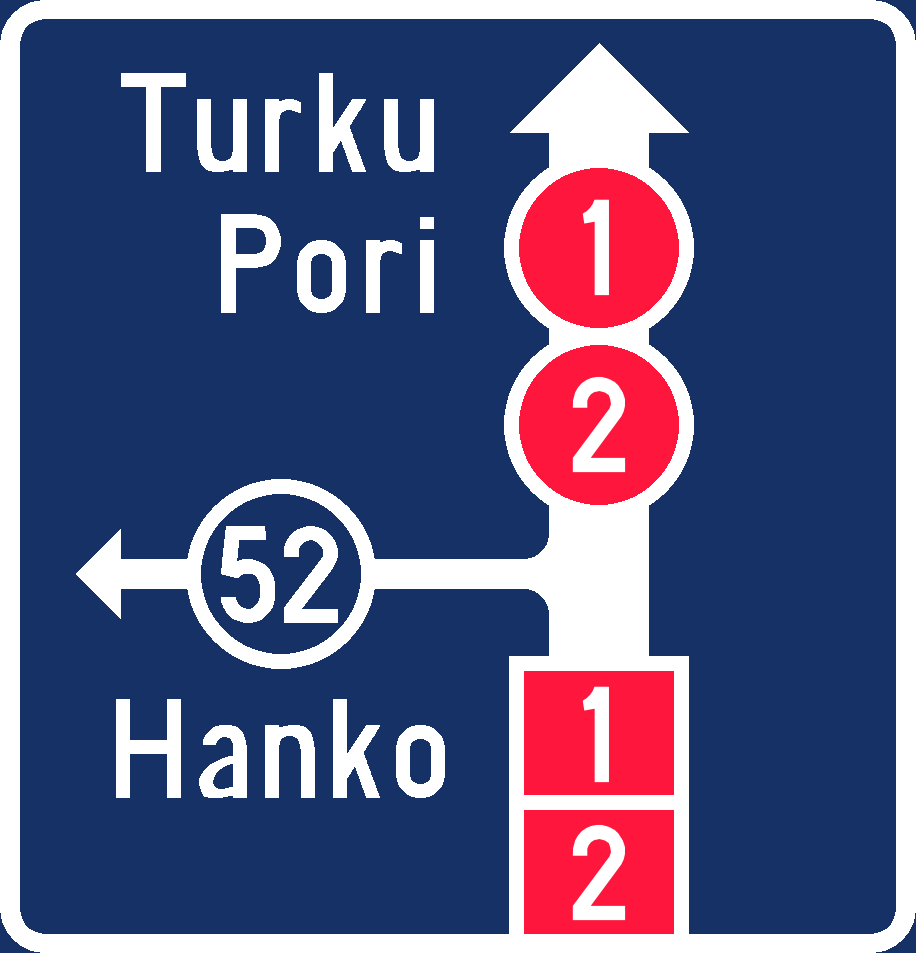
Advance direction sign

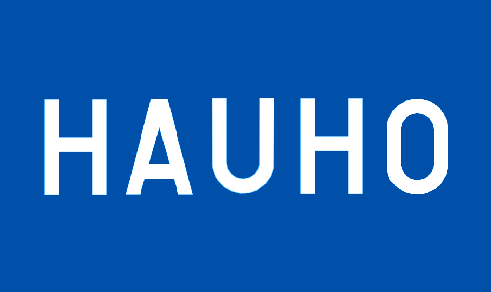
Urban area

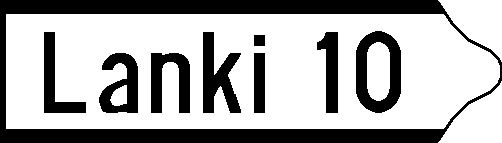
Direction sign

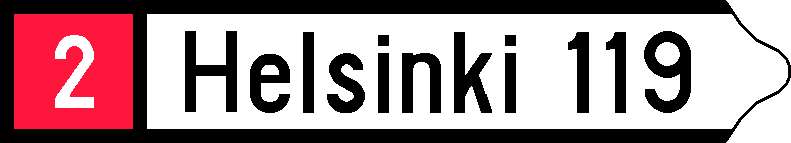
Direction sign or highway

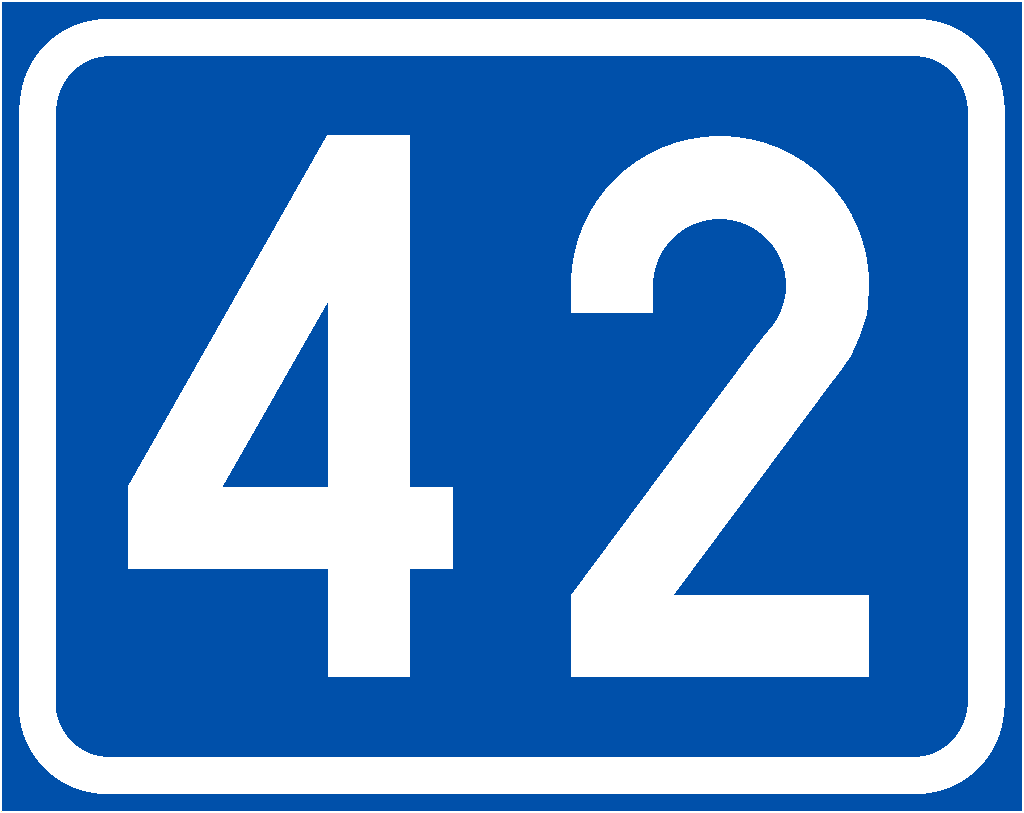
Route number

==== 1962 addition ====
Motorway

Motorway ends

==== 1969 addition ====
Two-way traffic

Slippery road

Pedestrian crossing ahead

Roundabout

Give way to oncoming traffic

Speed limit

Speed limit ends

No overtaking ends

Priority over oncoming traffic

Mechanical help

Filling station

Camping

== Road signs in Åland ==
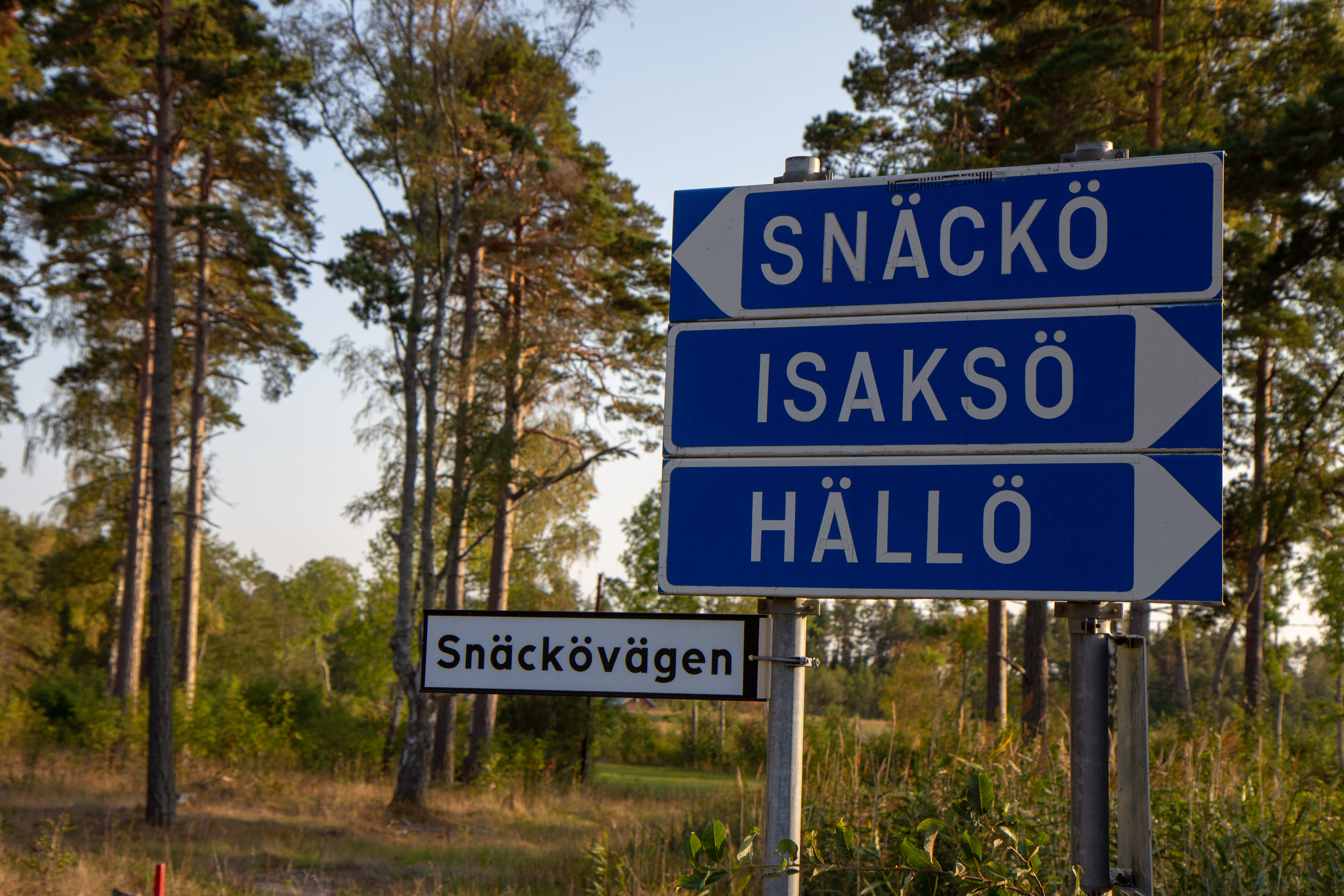
Direction signs in Åland

Road signs in Åland are mostly based on the Swedish road signs, even though Åland is a part of Finland.

=== Warning signs ===

Children

Crossroads without priority

Crossroads with priority

Traffic lights ahead

V26 Logging route

V29 Other danger

=== Priority signs ===
Fö1 Give way

Fö2 Stop

Fö3 Priority road

Fö4 End of priority road

Fö5 Priority to oncoming traffic

Fö6 Priority over oncoming traffic

=== Prohibitory signs ===
Vehicular traffic prohibited

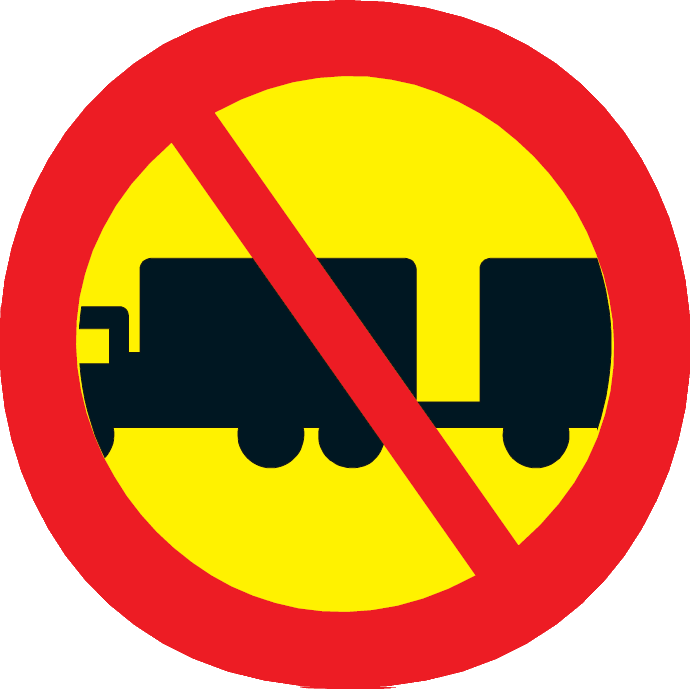

No entry

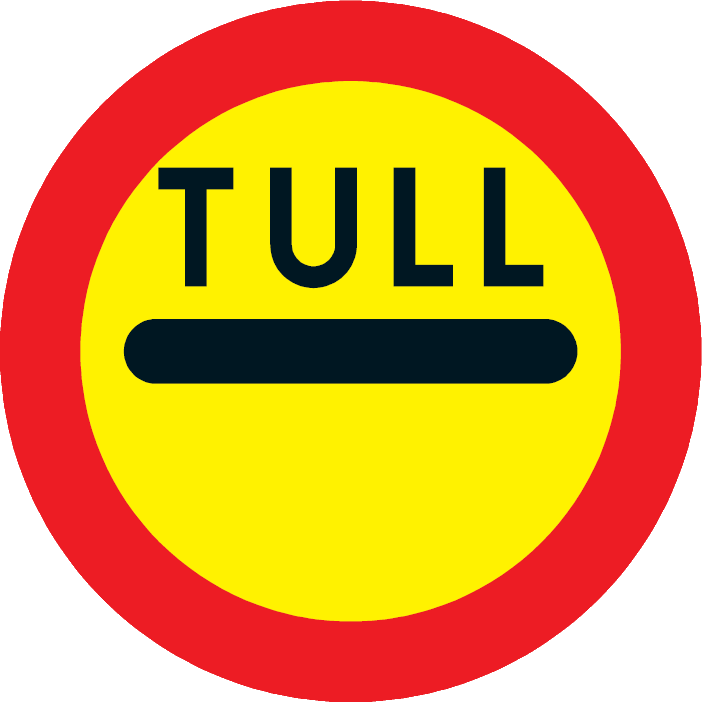
Stop at customs

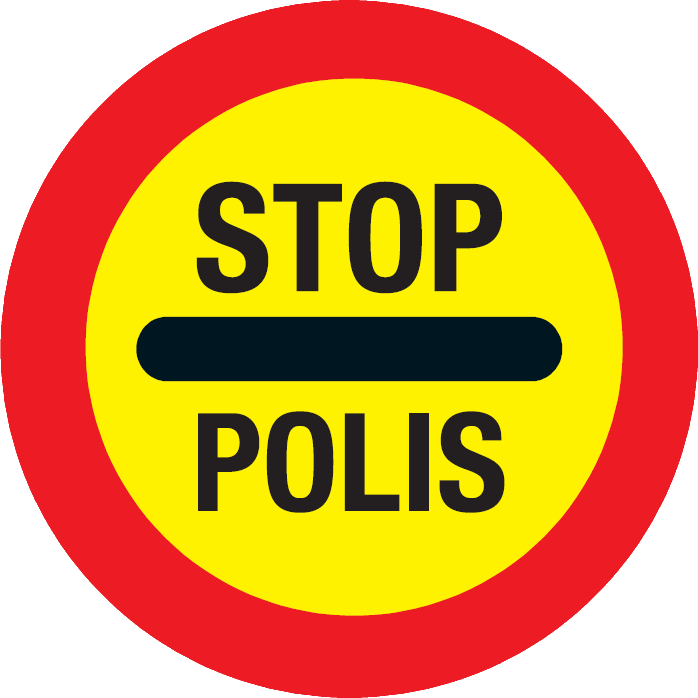

No stopping

No parking

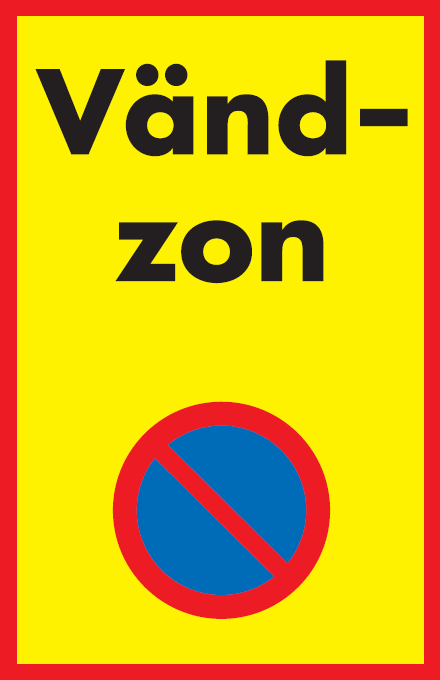

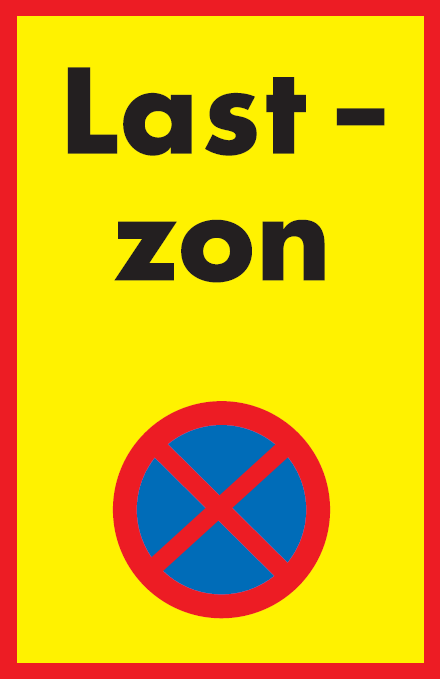

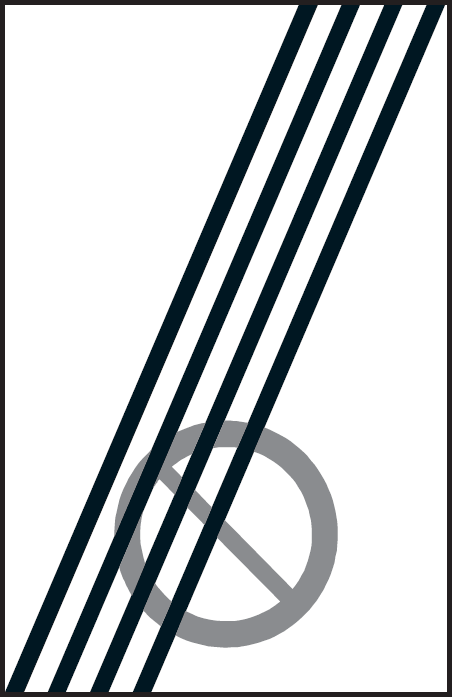

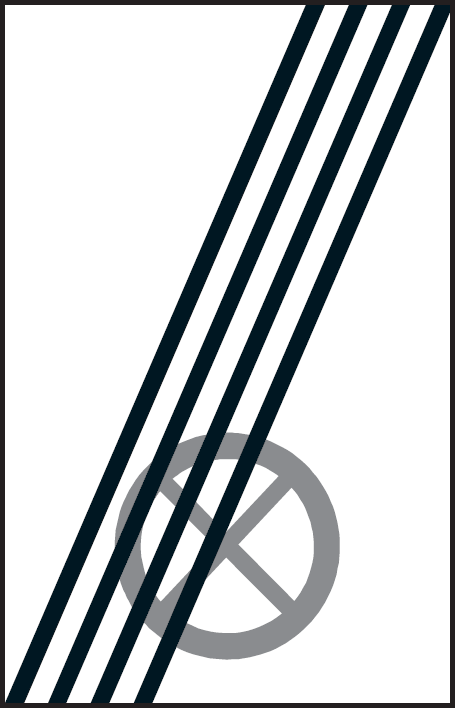

No parking on odd days

No parking on even days

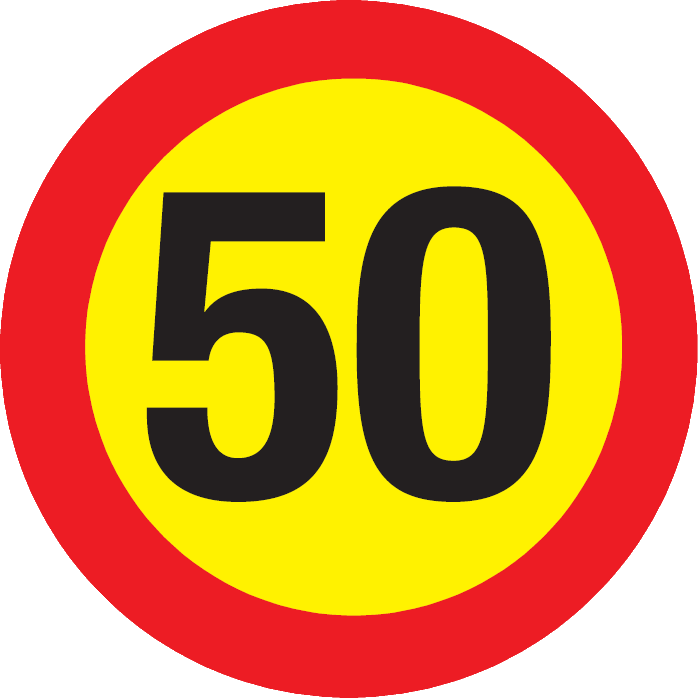
F30 Speed limit

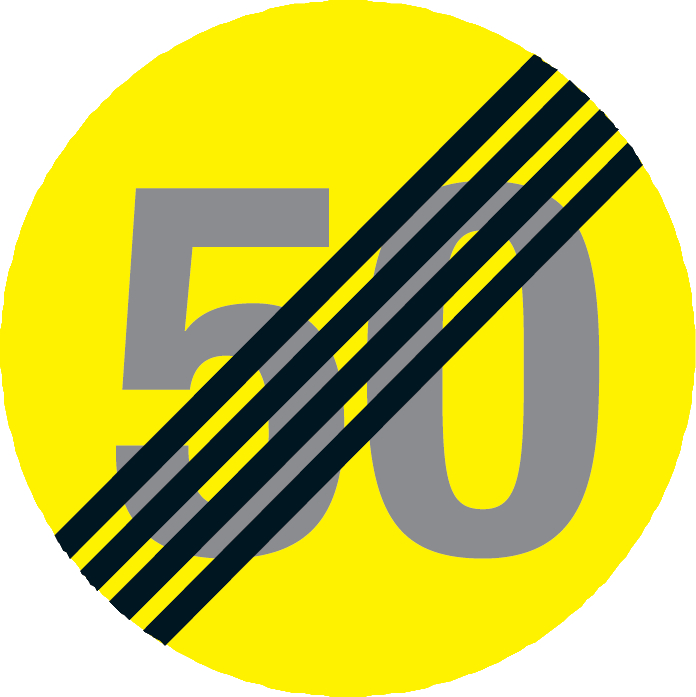
F31 End of speed limit

=== Other signs ===
A3 Home zone

A4 End of home zone

A5 Pedestrian zone

A6 Pedestrian zone ends

A11 Pedestrian crossing

Tourist Area

Postal Road

Detour information

Midway sign bike
