= Direction, position, or indication sign =

Type of road sign

An example of a British direction sign on the approach to a roundabout.

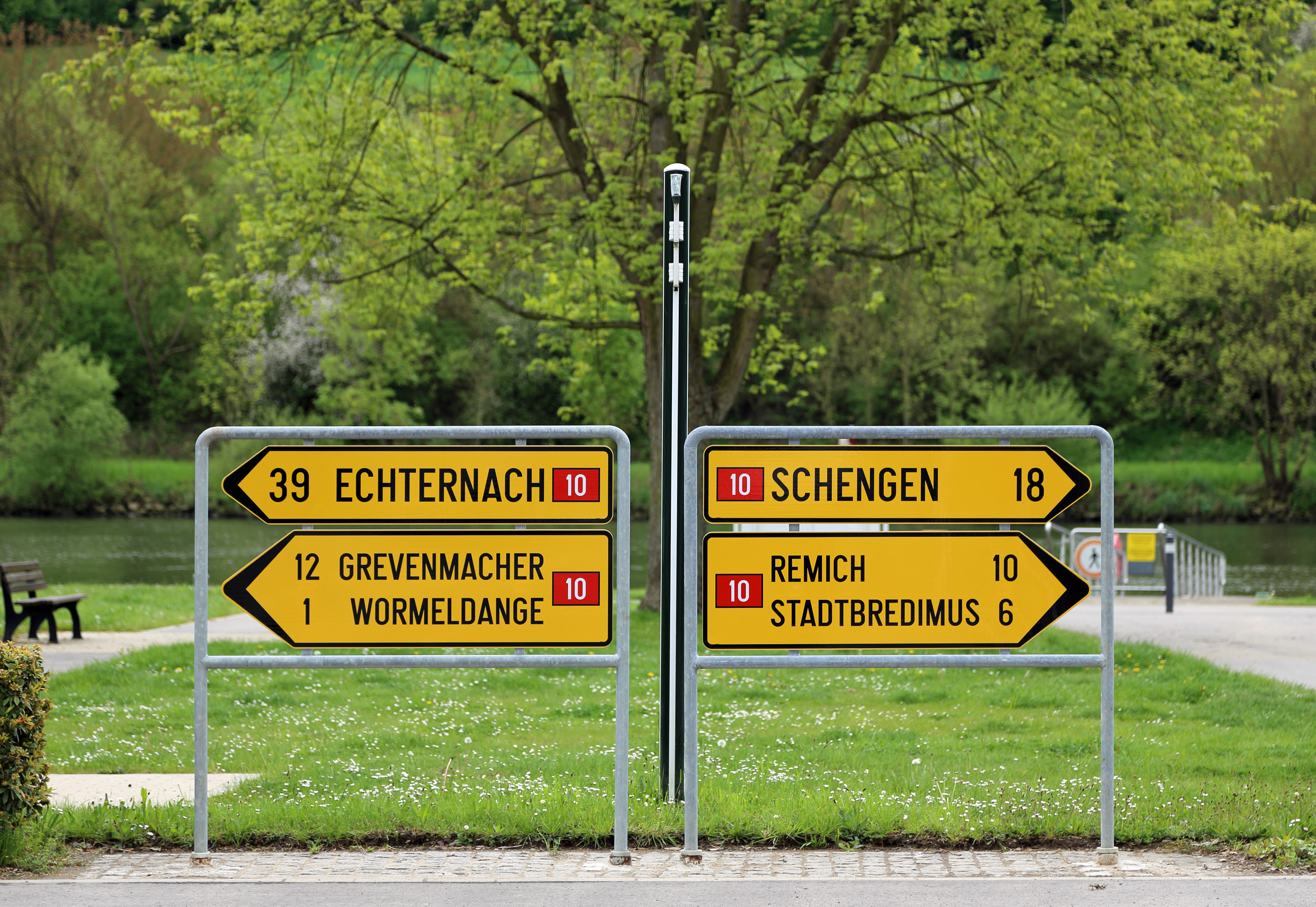
Directional road signs in Luxembourg

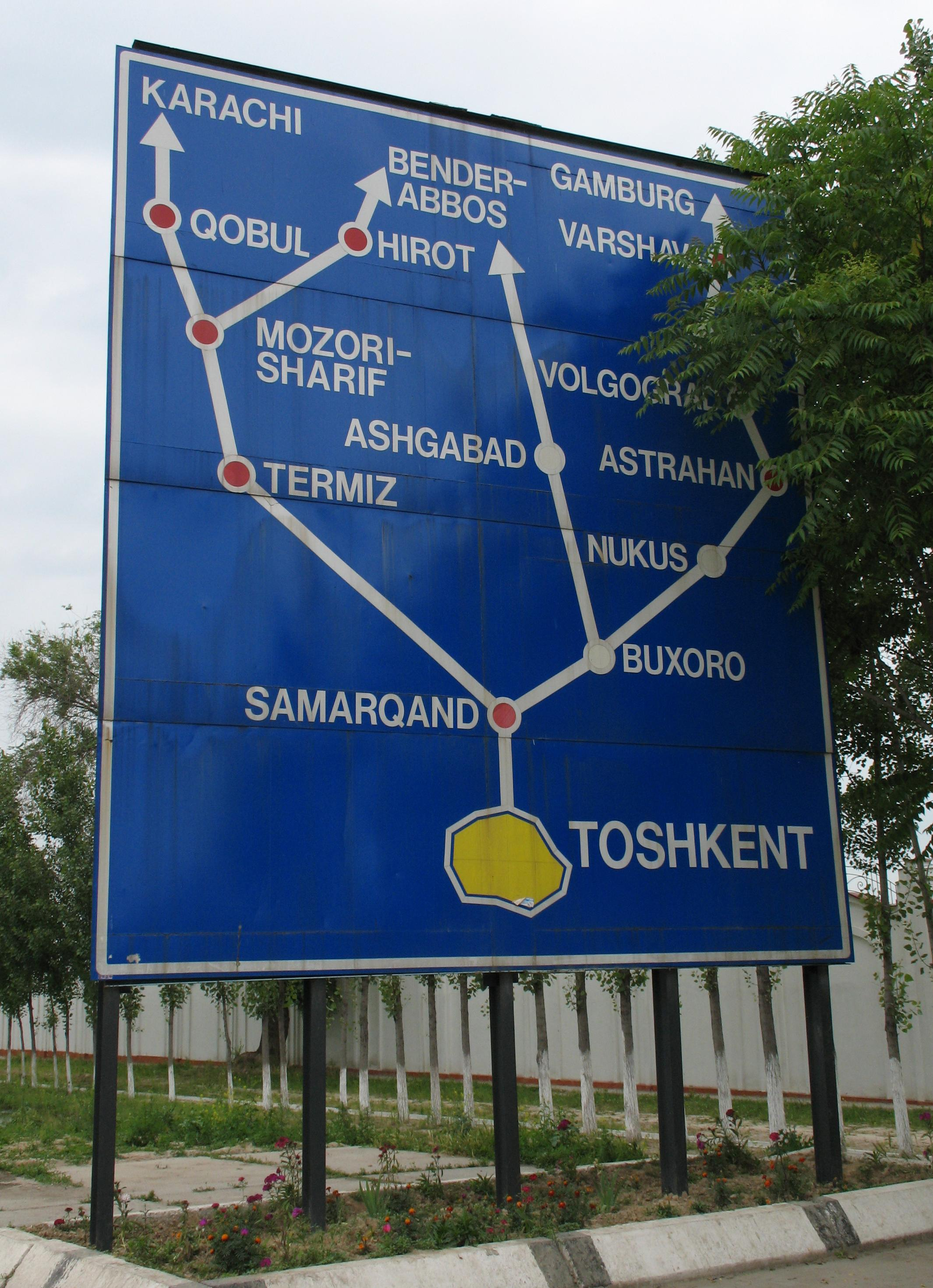
Road sign on M39 south of Tashkent, showing destinations as far away as Hamburg (Gamburg) and Karachi

A direction sign, more fully defined as a direction, position, or indication sign by the Vienna Convention on Road Signs and Signals, is any road sign used primarily to give information about the location of either the driver or possible destinations, and are considered a subset of the informative signs group. Direction signs are far more varied internationally than other classes of sign, as the Vienna Convention does not specify sizes, colours, symbols or positions of such signs.

Direction signs are the oldest type of road sign; Plutarch writes about milestones being placed in the 3rd century BC, while some fingerposts in the United Kingdom date back to at least the 1690s. However, it was not until the invention of the motor car at the turn of the 20th century that modern direction signs evolved, with fewer words and clear design allowing them to be read at speed.

== History ==
=== Pre-automobile ===
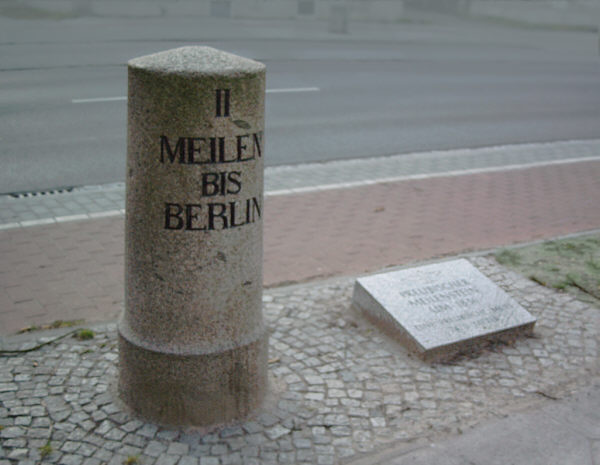
A Prussian milestone c. 1836, reading "II MEILEN BIS BERLIN" ("two miles to Berlin").

The first direction signs were milestones on the Roman road network; finding one's location on the long, straight roads was difficult, and hence, large stones were placed at intervals along the roads, giving the distance in Roman miles to nearby major cities, and usually to the capitals of major provinces. As most Roman roads diverged from Rome, one of the numbers was usually the distance to the Milliarium Aureum, a large golden milestone in the centre of Rome, although sometimes other stones, such as the London Stone, were used in places where measuring distances from Rome was impossible or not useful.

The use of milestones continued following the decline of the Roman Empire. However, as trading between towns and regions increased, waymarks such as parting stones were used to give directions at crossroads. In England fingerposts were developed. Erected by local parishes, fingerposts were easier to read from horseback and were cheaper to make. With the development of the turnpike and the stagecoach, the Turnpike Roads Act 1773 was passed, making signposting compulsory to allow the riders to judge their speed and prevent them from becoming lost. Similar signs were developed in other countries and remained in use until the early-20th century, when development of the motor car made the small and often wordy signs impractical.

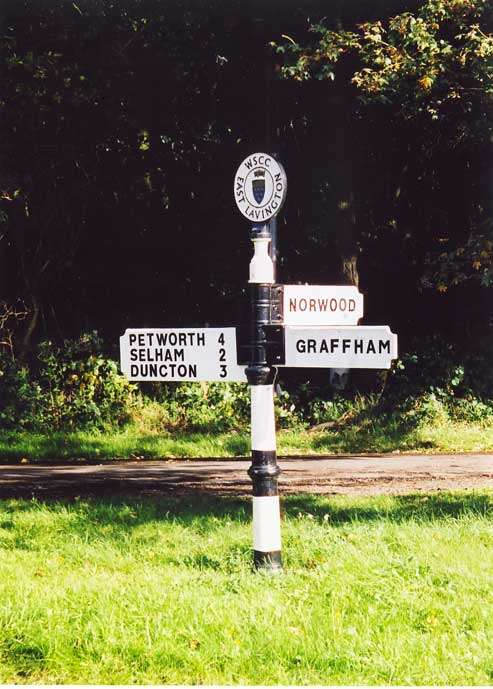
A British fingerpost of the style used before modernisation.

=== Modernisation ===
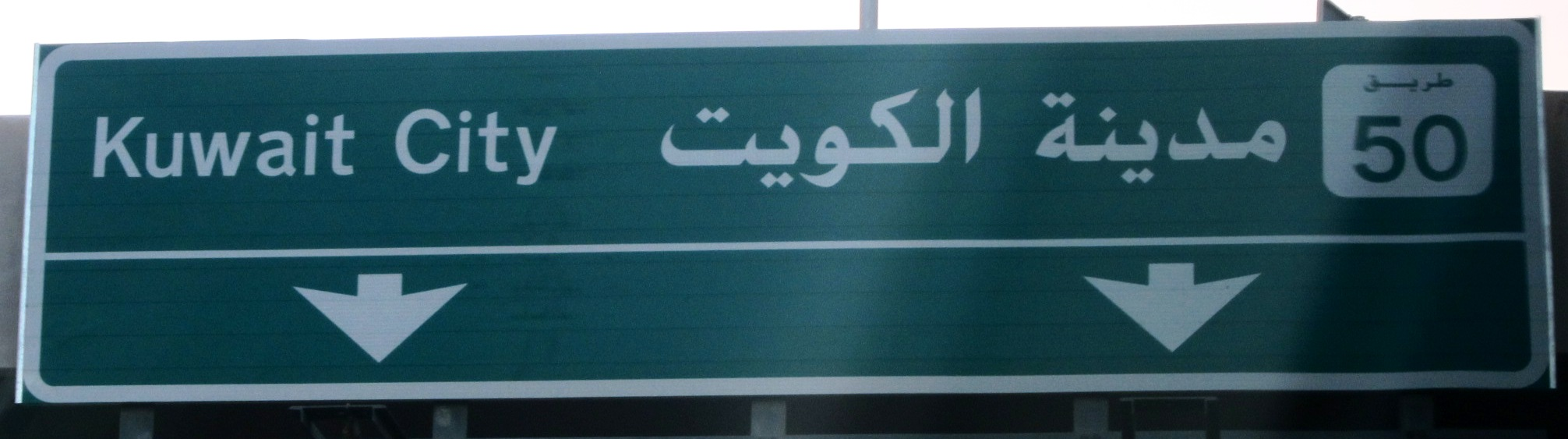
An overhead sign showing the way to Kuwait City

Most early direction signs were based on the traditional styles in use in area; the United Kingdom used adapted, cast iron fingerposts for signing directions, while the United States adopted an ad hoc scheme based on traditional trail markings. These proved unwieldy, and modernisation efforts quickly sprang up to change them. However, the changes faced opposition, both from traditionalists who preferred the style or charm of older signs, and from businesses along affected routes, which feared that standardised direction signs would favour the new highways, causing rural routes to fade into obscurity.

The advent of World War II halted sign modernisation efforts across Europe, however, and governments removed direction signs from their road networks – fearing that they would assist enemy spies and/or invading forces. The end of the war, on the other hand, presented itself as an opportunity, seized by many European nations, to set about redeveloping their directional signage systems. The construction of high-speed motorways meant that traditional road signs were no longer practical, and so new, modern signs with bold, sans serif typefaces and diagrams indicating lanes and sliproads ahead were developed. The British Worboys Committee (established in 1963) went even further, creating signs with detailed diagrams of junction layouts. Such signs have now been in use almost unchanged for over half a century.

== Design ==
The Vienna Convention on Road Signs and Signals divides the direction, position, or indication sign category into direction signs, which are only those giving distances or directions to a given location; road identification signs (also known as "reassurance signs"), which repeat the name or number of the road, and place identification signs, which give the name of a landmark, such as a town, river or border. Unlike the other classes of sign, direction signs remain broadly undefined by the convention; the only restrictions given are that direction signs must be either a rectangle or an arrow shaped pentagon, and that they may not contain placenames in more than two languages. Additionally, direction signs on motorways must be blue or green, while temporary direction signs are yellow or orange.

As a result, different nations can have wildly different direction signs; the United States uses verbose green gantry signs almost universally in built up areas, with few diagrams beyond basic arrows, while the United Kingdom, Ireland and Iceland use signs with fewer words but detailed maps of the approaching junctions. Most areas use different colours to show different road types, but the implementation varies: the United Kingdom (and Ireland) uses full colour boards, colour-coded to match the type of road they are placed on, with relevant text highlighted within patches of other colours to indicate different road types using the Guildford Rules. The United States, Canada, and Australia, as well as New Zealand on the other hand almost universally use the plain green signs, but some signs use different colours to highlight certain types of destination such as hospitals and rest stops, or, in Australia and Ontario, that the road is a tollway. Road signs in Israel and the Palestinian territories are of similar design to North American signage, but vary in color depending on whether the sign indicates direction for through traffic, exiting traffic, etc.

Direction signs can also be used in conjunction with other types of sign: for example, in the United Kingdom, if a warning or prohibitory sign appears on a direction sign, it means that the route indicated by the sign contains the hazard or prohibition sign posted.

== Gallery ==
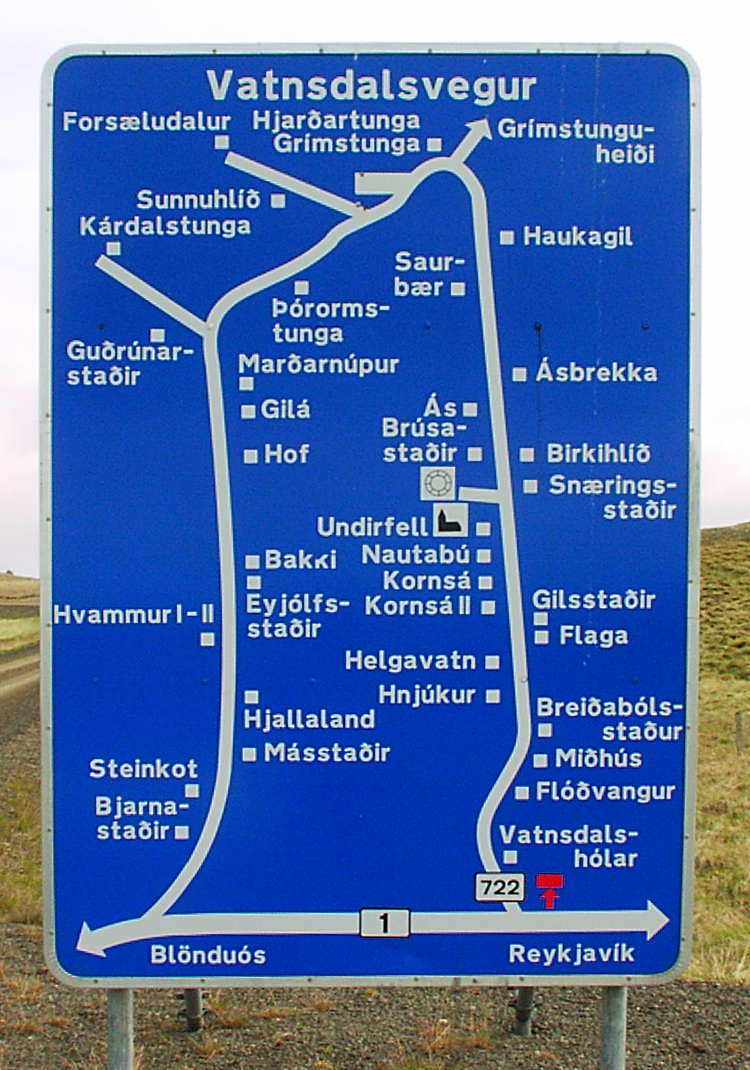
An Icelandic road sign, with detailed directions to nearby farmsteads.

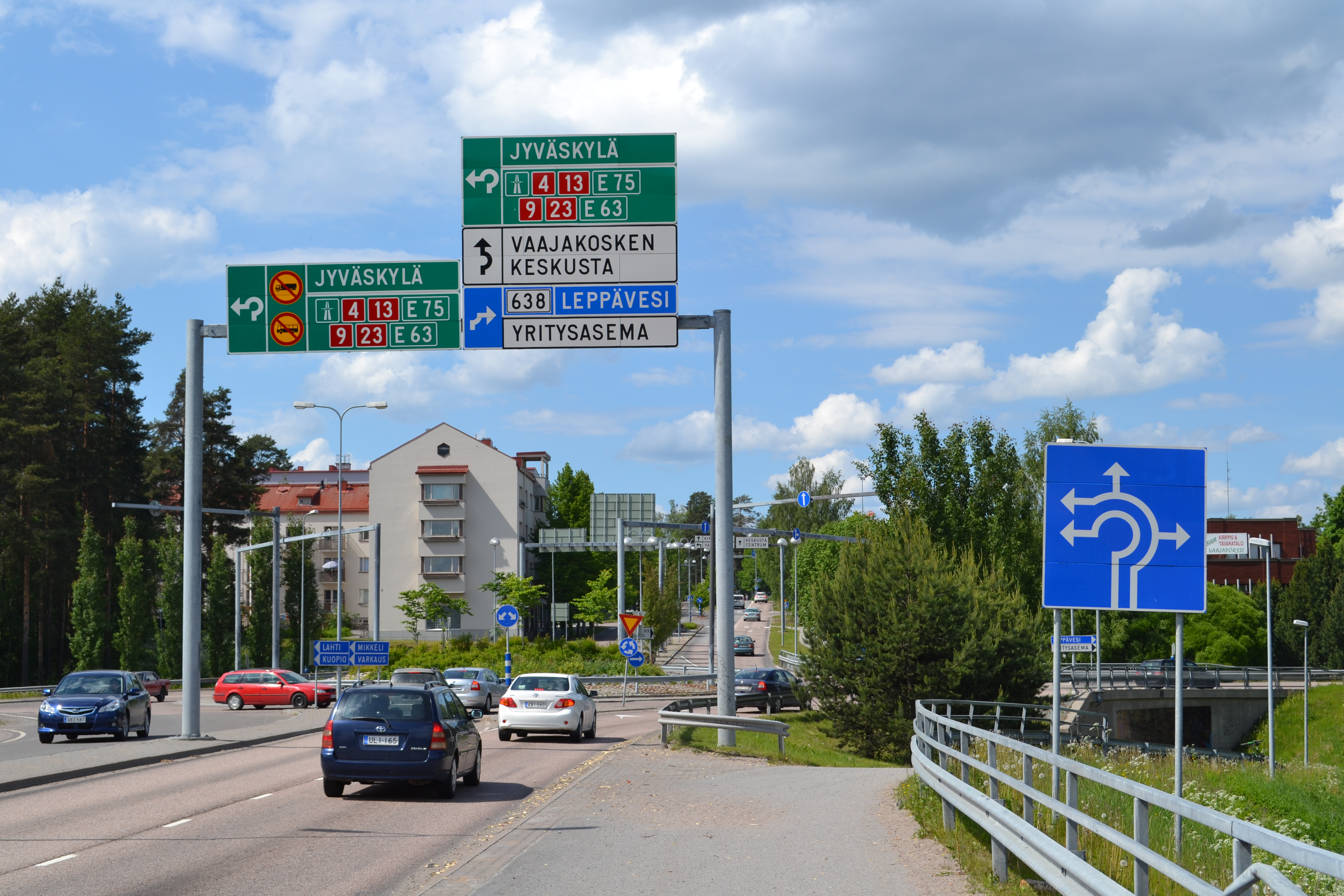
Finnish road signs detailing directions at Vaajakoski's roundabout in Jyväskylä, Finland.

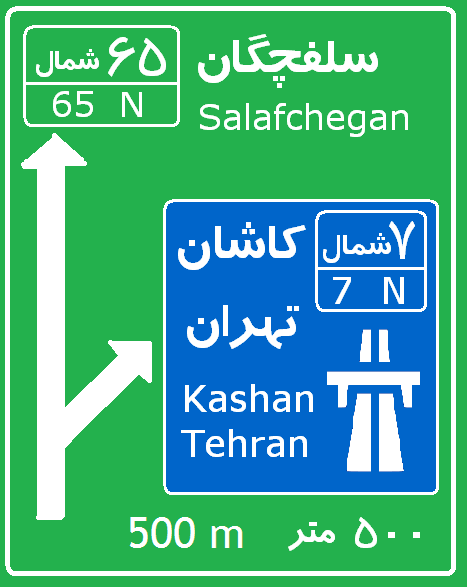
The Junction of Freeway 7 (Iran) and Road 65 (Iran).

A simple German sign on the approach to an off ramp.

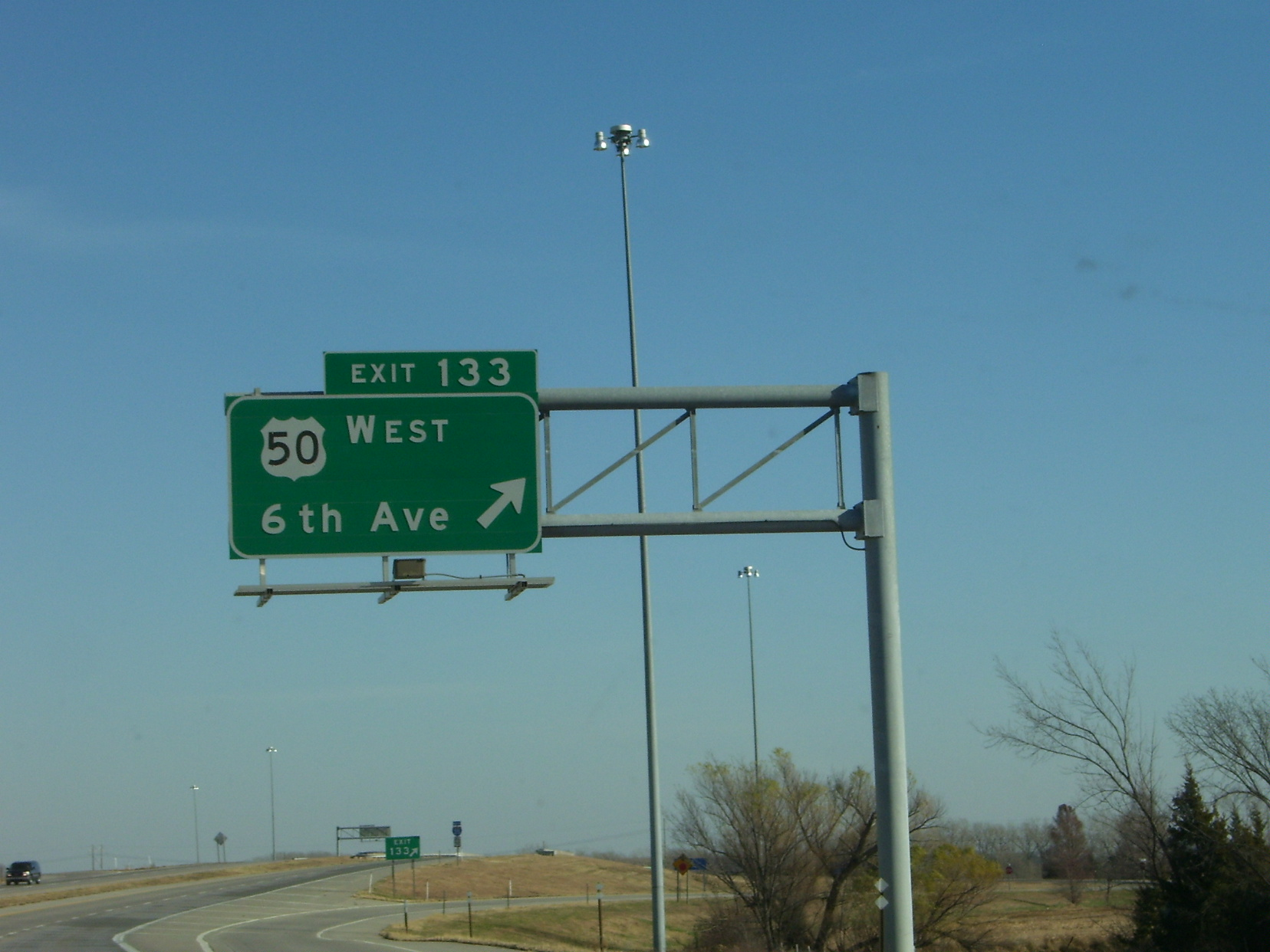
Signage along Interstate 35 in Emporia, Kansas, USA.

Route confirmation sign with an indirect destination in Hungary.

An intersection in Croatia.

Polish road sign E-1, placed before roundabout.

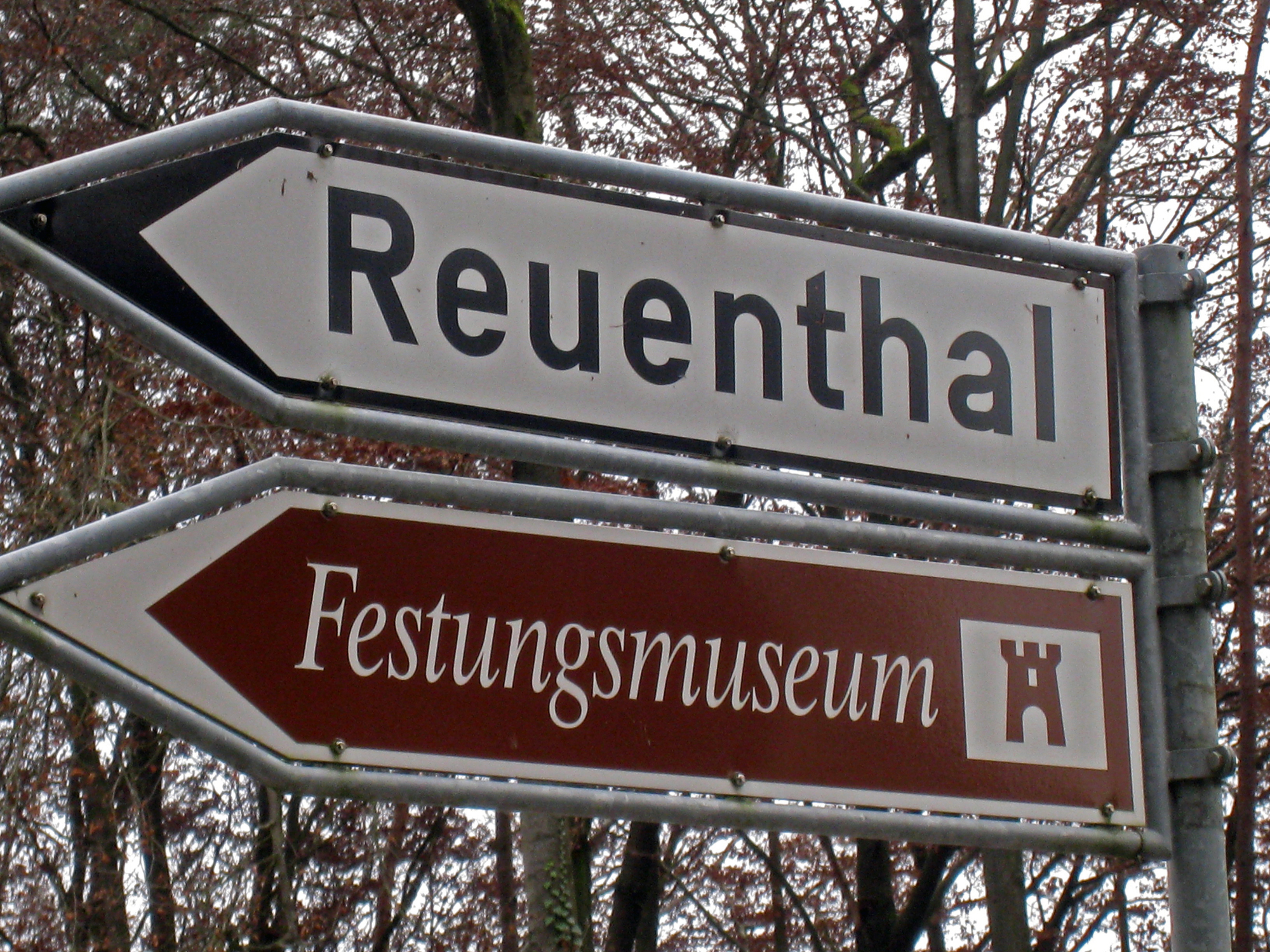
Direction signs for a minor route to a destination (white) and tourist attraction (brown) in Switzerland.

A sign indicating to a park in Singapore.

Interchange advance guide road sign in Japan.

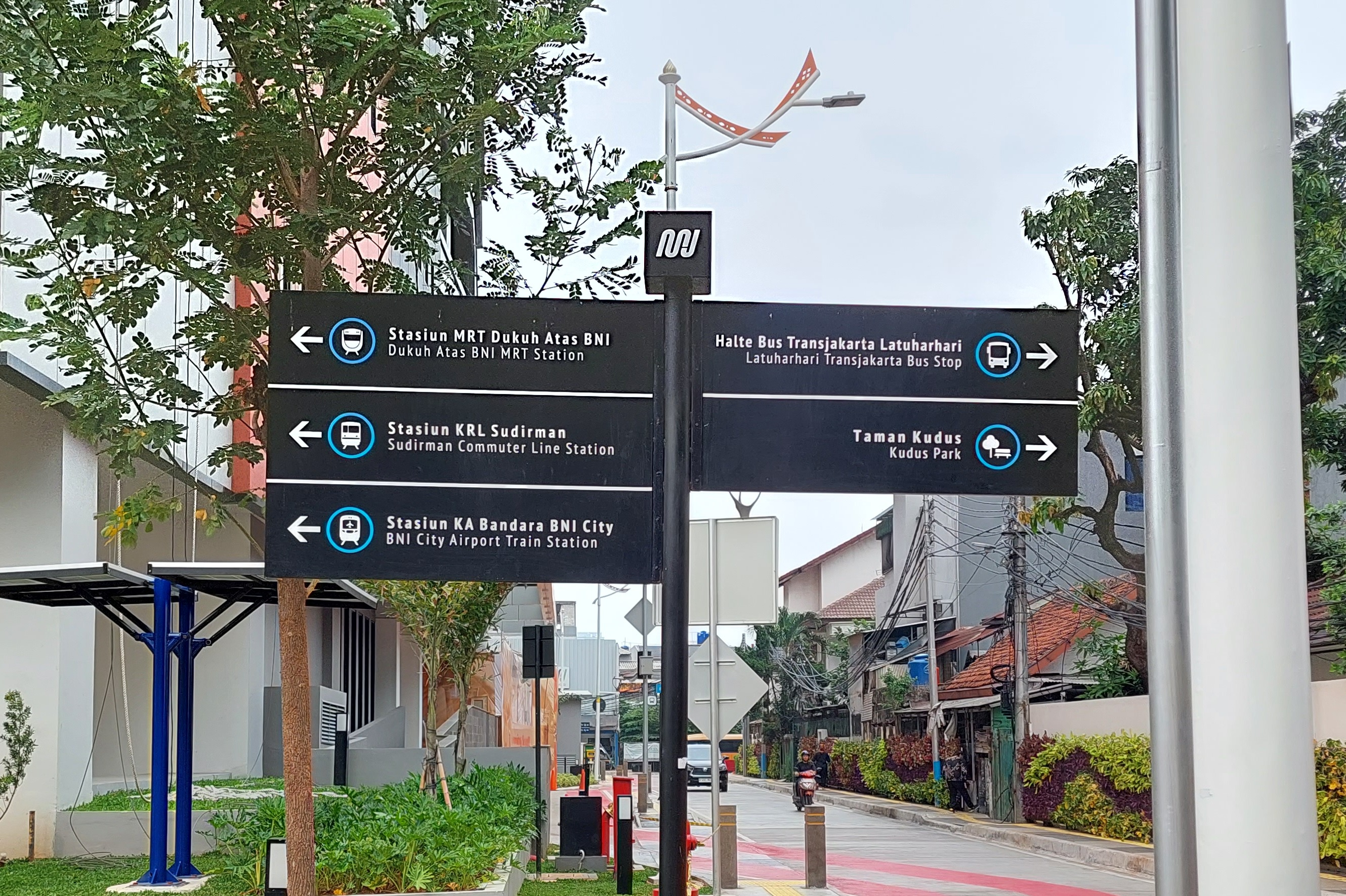
An Fingerposts sign walking, with direction to Transit-oriented of the Dukuh Atas TOD in Indonesia.

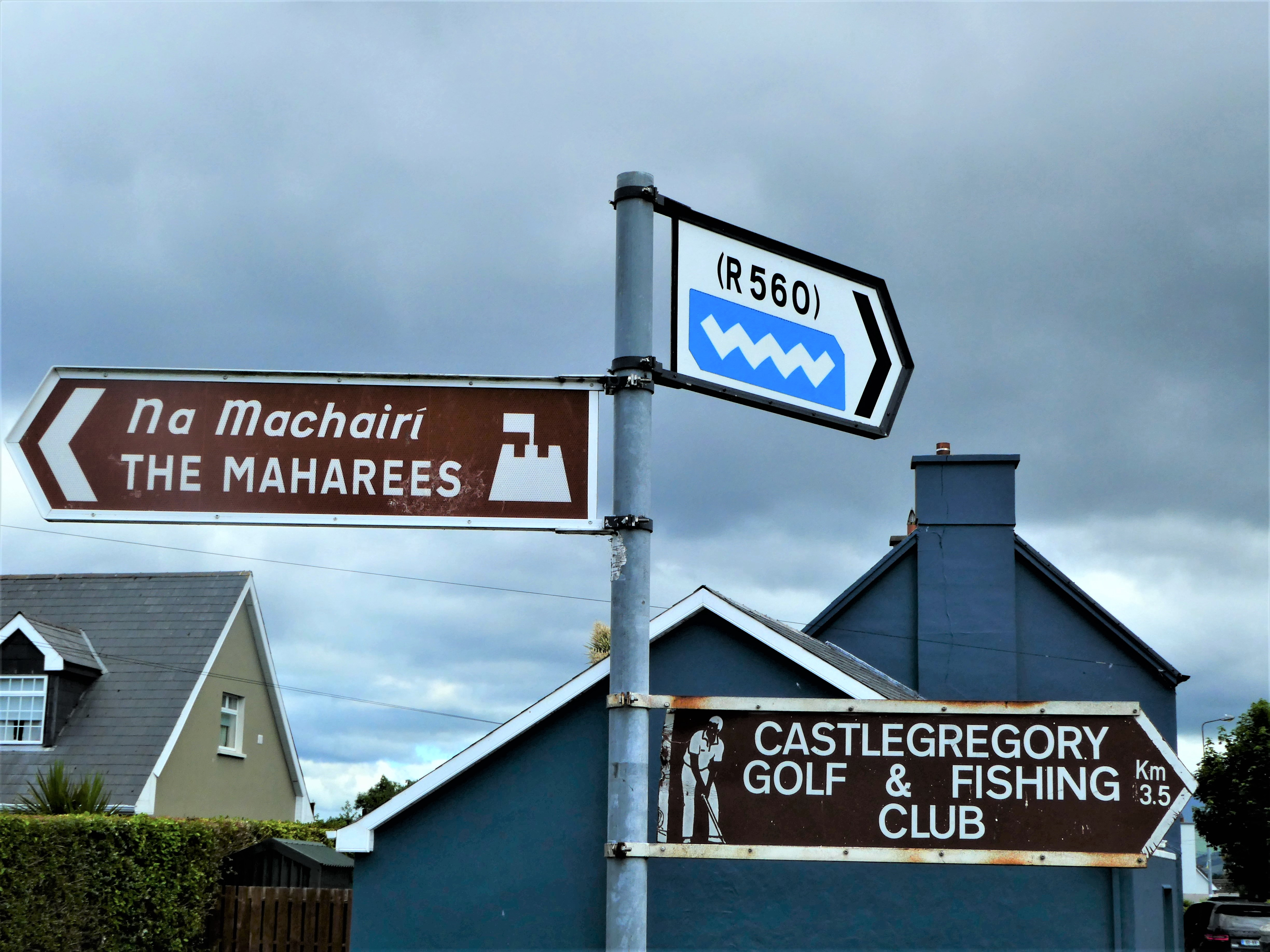
Fingerposts in Ireland with tourist attractions and road names.

Roundabout directional sign in Indonesia.

Lithuanian informatory road sign.

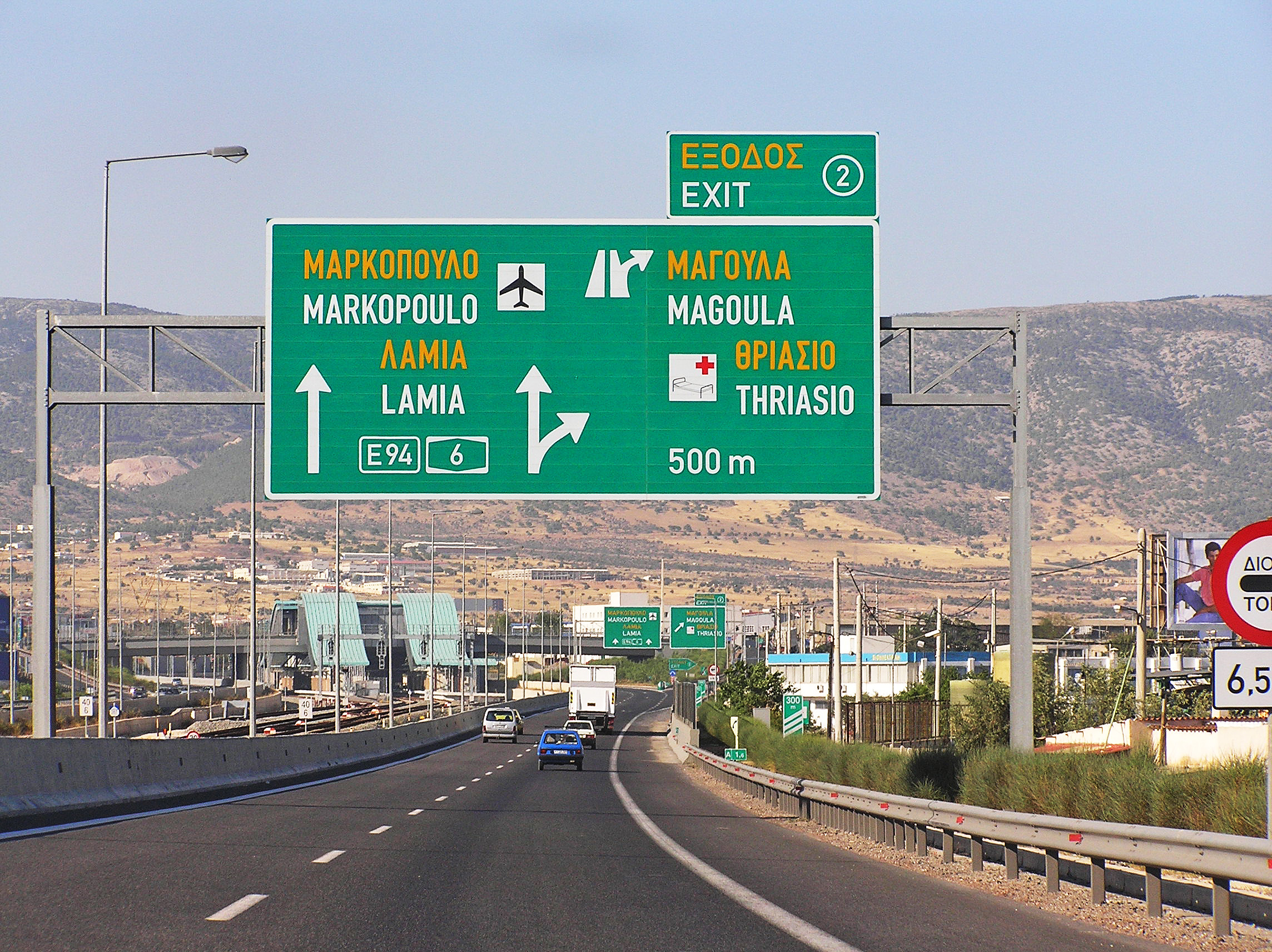
Interchange advance guide road signs with Greek text in yellow and English text in white.

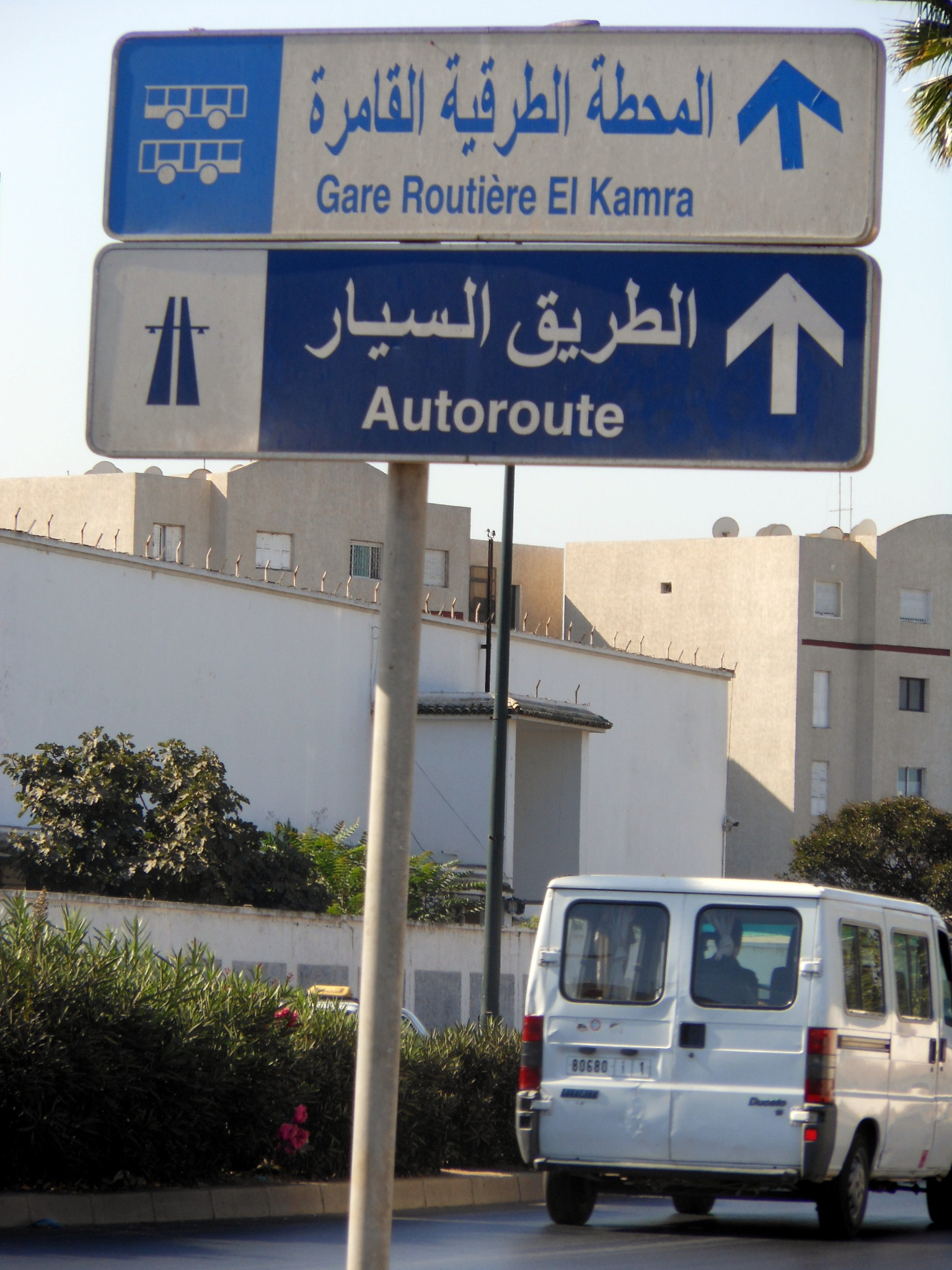
Bilingual road sign in Morocco with Arabic and French text

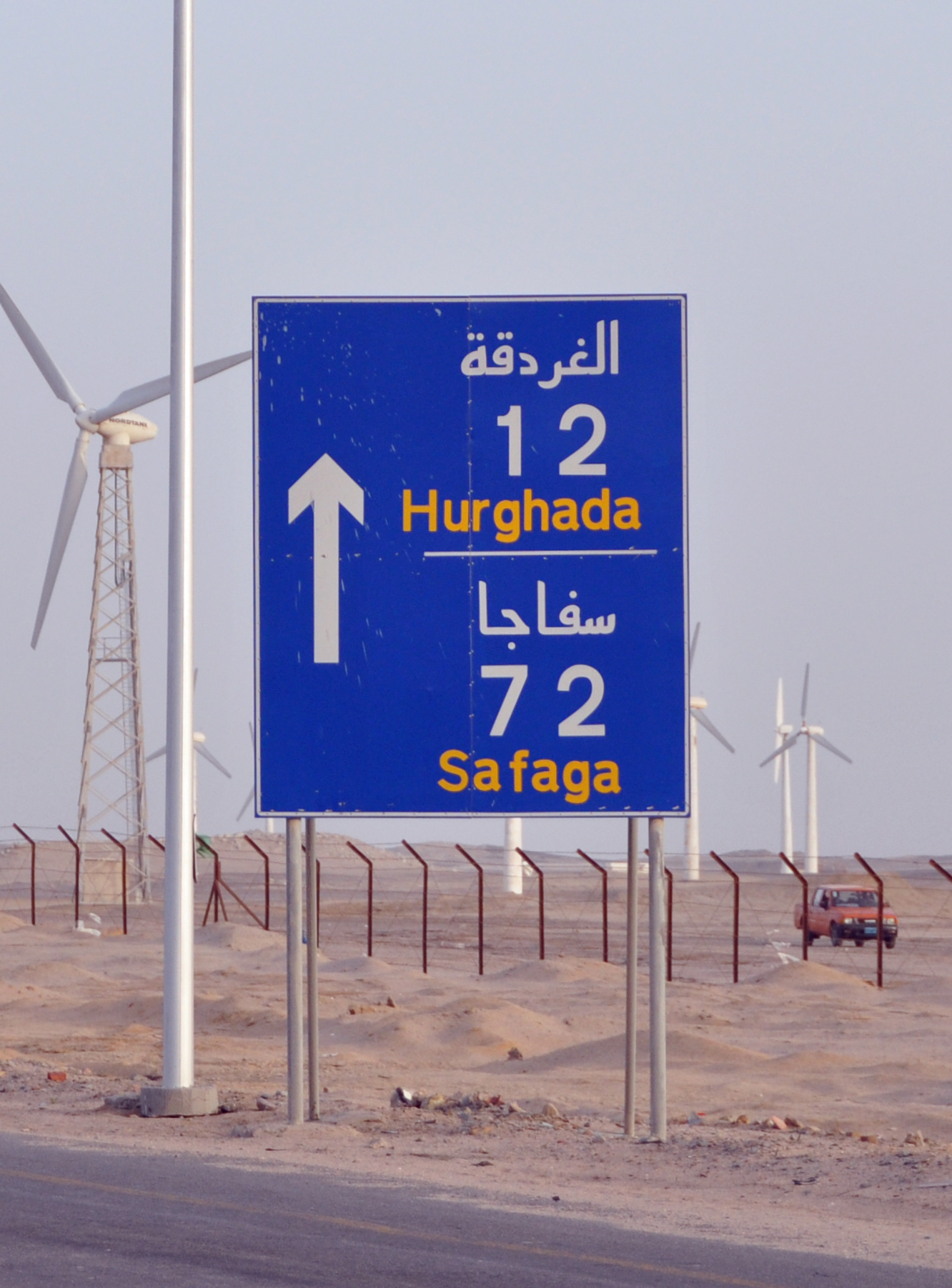
Road sign in Egypt

== Evacuation routes ==
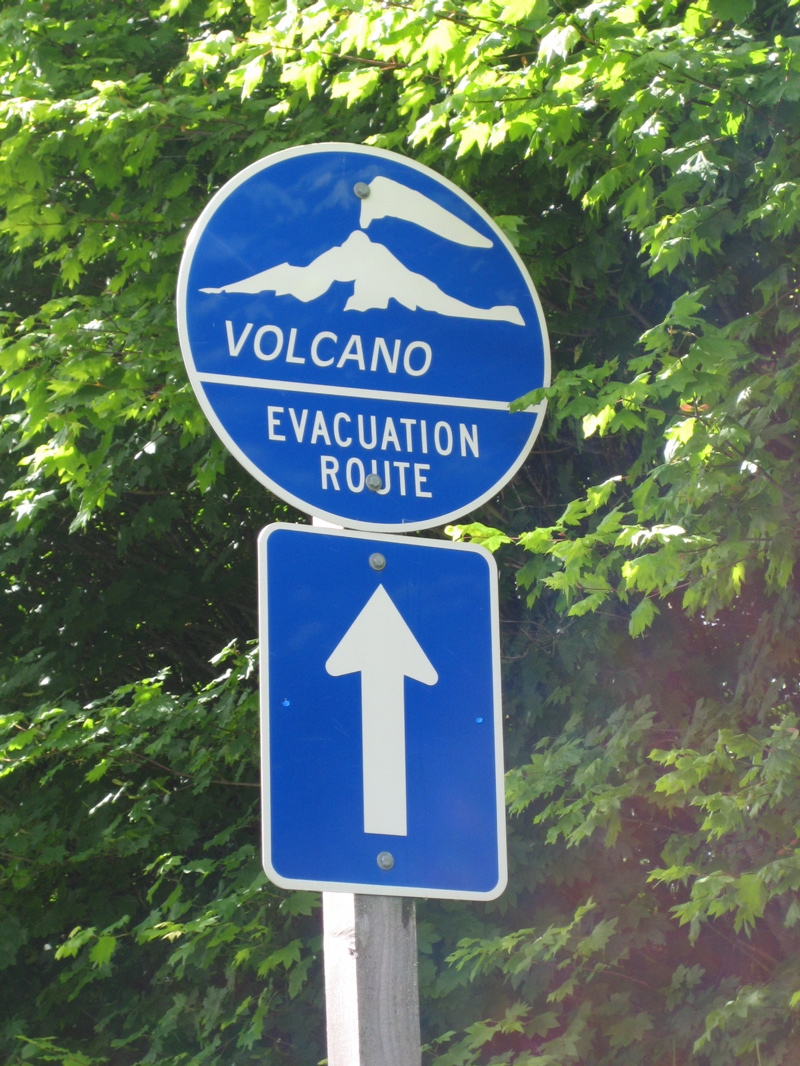
A volcano evacuation route; to be followed in case of an eruption of lahar.

Some areas have special evacuation route signs that are to be followed in case of certain disasters. The signs point to routes either to safety or to less danger.

Evacuation signs are common in areas where there is a high risk of dangers such as flash flooding, volcanic activity and lahar, tsunami, hurricane and storm surge. For example, along the Japanese shorelines, the tsunami warning signs are linked with a network of warning sirens, typically at the top of the cliff of surroundings hills.

== See also ==
- Bilingual sign
- Cairn
- Driver location signs
- Exit number
- Highway location marker
