= Very important person =

Person with privileges due to their status

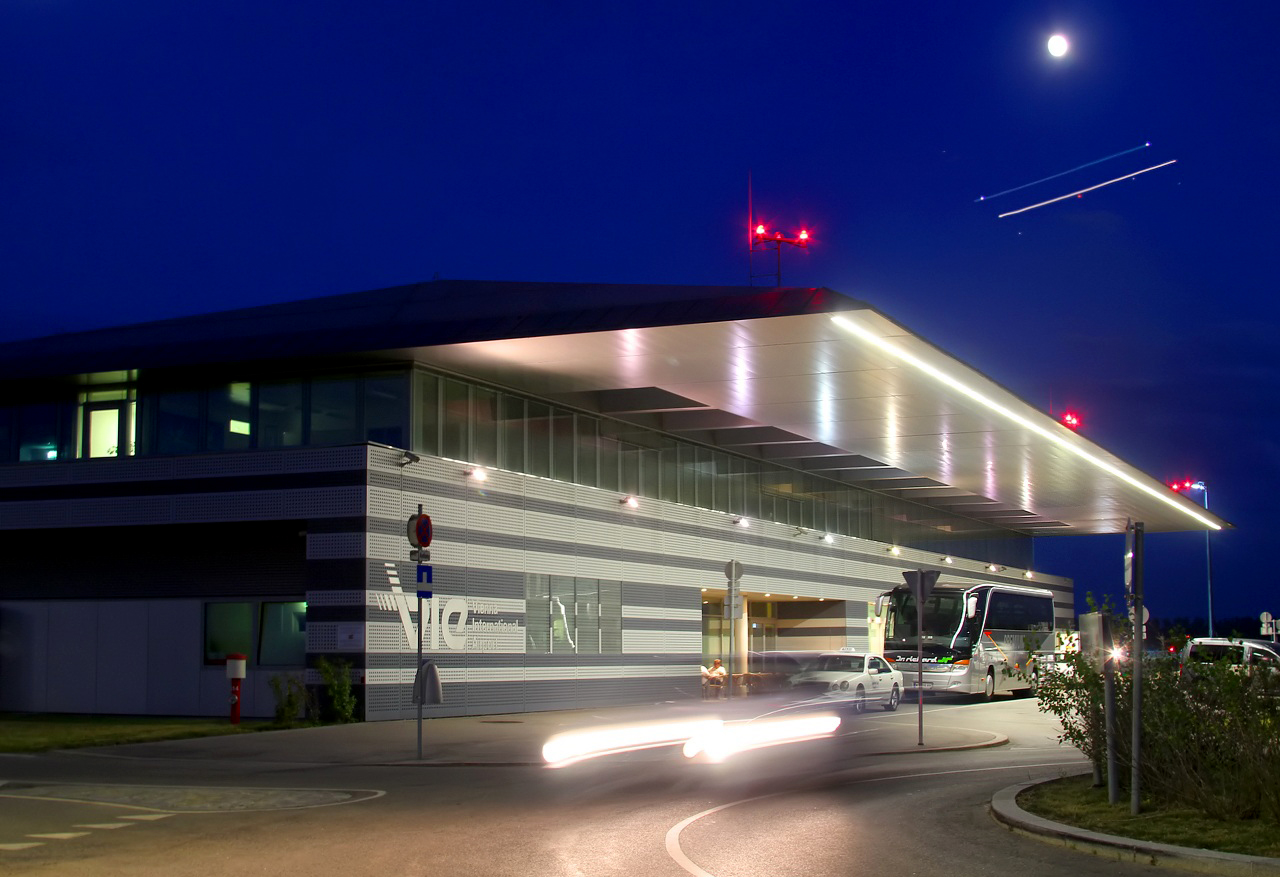
The VIP Terminal at Vienna International Airport that is often used by celebrities and high-ranking government officials

A very important person (VIP or V.I.P.) or personage is a person who is accorded special privileges due to their high social rank, status, influence, or importance. The term was not common until sometime after World War II when it was popularised by Royal Air Force pilots.

Examples include celebrities, heads of state or government, other high-ranking politicians, religious leaders, high-net-worth individuals, or any other socially notable person who receives special treatment for any reason. The special treatment usually involves separation from common people, and a higher level of comfort or service.

== Commerce ==
In some cases, such as with tickets, VIP may be used as a title in a similar way to premium or exclusive. Usually in airports, VIP tickets can be purchased by anyone, but still meaning separation from other customers, own security checks etc.

VIP airport terminals may be used by foreign ministers, ambassadors or high-ranking government personalities, provided that they are officially invited by the receiving country's government.

== VVIP ==
Sometimes, the term very very important person (VVIP or V.V.I.P.) is also used, especially with reference to VIPs with very high socioeconomic rank or purchasing power. It is used especially when anyone can buy VIP treatment, to distinguish people with especially high requirements. V.V.V.I.P. (or VVVIP) can denote even another, higher level of exclusivity.

== See also ==
- High-net-worth individual
- VVIP (disambiguation)
