= Vienna Convention on Road Signs and Signals =

1968 international treaty

Convention on Road Signs and Signals
- Signatories and ratifications as of September 2024 Signed Ratified Accession / succession Uses the SADC Convention Uses the SICA Convention
- Signed: 8 November 1968
- Location: Vienna
- Effective: 6 June 1978
- Condition: Ratification by 15 states
- Signatories: 35
- Parties: 71
- Depositary: UN Secretary-General
- Languages: Chinese, English, French, Russian and Spanish

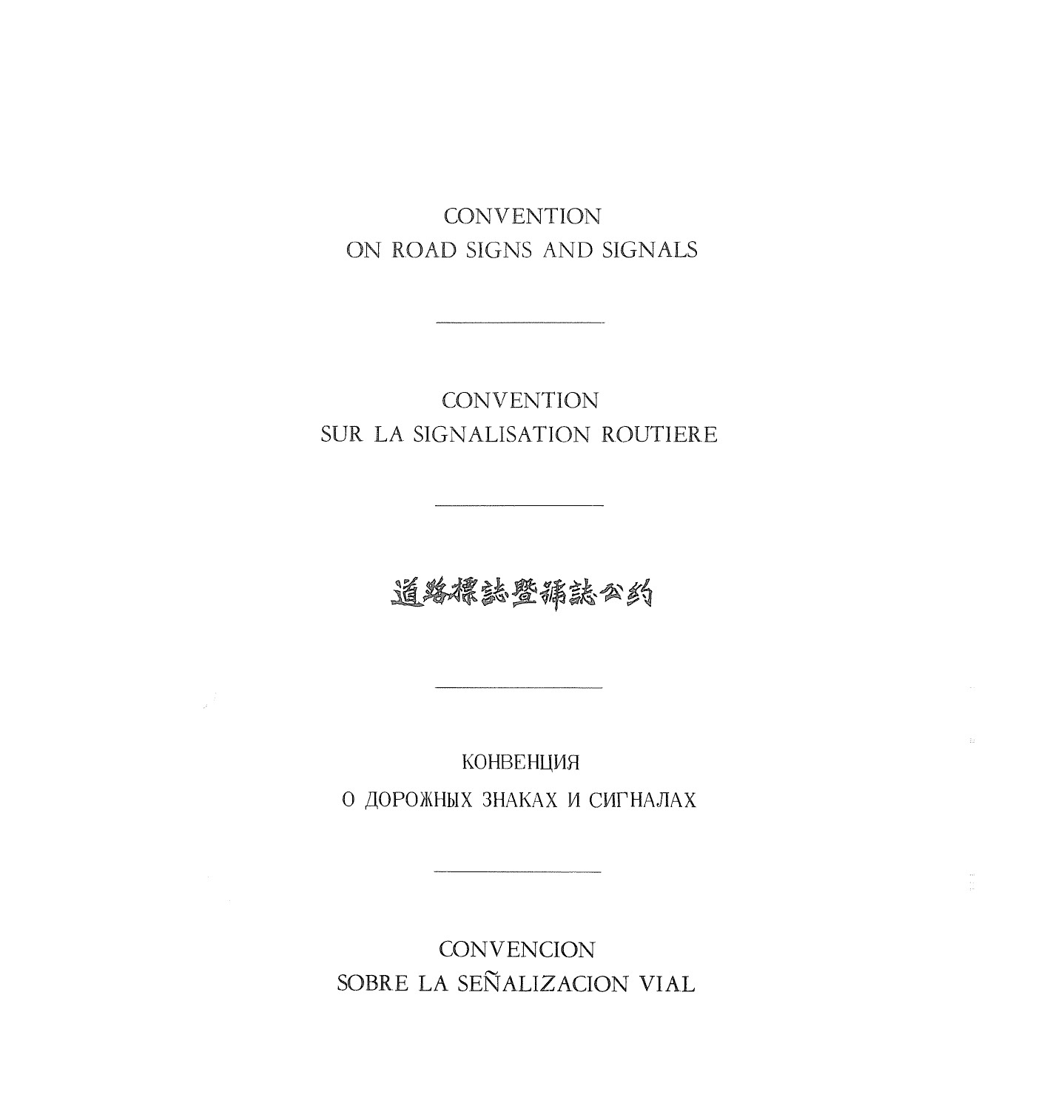
The title page of the Vienna Convention on Road Signs and Signals

The Convention on Road Signs and Signals, commonly known as the Vienna Convention on Road Signs and Signals, is a multilateral treaty that establishes an international standard for signing systems for road traffic, such as road signs, traffic lights and road markings.

The Convention was agreed upon by the United Nations Economic and Social Council at its Conference on Road Traffic in Vienna, Austria from 7 October to 8 November 1968. Thirty-one countries signed the Convention on the final day of the conference, and it entered into force on 6 June 1978. This conference also produced the Vienna Convention on Road Traffic, which provides complementary standardising of international traffic laws.

== History ==
The origins of the Convention may be traced back to the International Convention on Motor Traffic concluded in Paris on 11 October 1909, which concerned motor vehicle construction, admission of international motor traffic, and road signs and signals. Commensurate with growing motor vehicle traffic, the 1909 convention was amended and expanded by two more treaties that were concluded in Paris on 24 April 1926: The International Convention relating to Road Traffic and the International Convention relating to Motor Traffic. As neither convention dealt exhaustively with road signs and signals, a Convention concerning the Unification of Road Signs was concluded in Geneva on 30 March 1931, which was expanded upon by the 1949 Convention on Road Traffic and a Protocol on Road Signs and Signals, likewise agreed upon in Geneva.

Amid calls for greater international uniformity in road signing systems, the Vienna Convention on Road Signs and Signals was called to revise and substantially extend the earlier 1949 Geneva Protocol,. Amendments, including new provisions regarding the legibility of signs, priority at roundabouts, and new signs to improve safety in tunnels were adopted in 2003.

Both the Vienna Convention and the Geneva Protocol were formed according to consensus on road traffic signs that evolved primarily in 20th century continental Western Europe. In order to make it as universal as possible, the convention allows some variations, for example danger warning signs can be triangular or square diamond in shape and road markings can be white or yellow. Though most UN members have not ratified the full treaty, the signs and legal principles enshrined in it form the basis of traffic law in a majority of places.

An alternative convention called the SADC-RTSM, provided by the Southern African Development Community (SADC), is used by ten countries in southern Africa. Many of the rules and principles of the SADC-RTSM are similar to those of the Vienna Convention.

In the United States, signs are based on the U.S. Federal Highway Administration's Manual on Uniform Traffic Control Devices. Signs in the MUTCD are often more text-oriented, though some signs do use pictograms as well. Canada and Australia have road signs based substantially on the MUTCD. In South America, several Asian countries (Cambodia, Japan, Thailand, Malaysia and Indonesia) and New Zealand, road signage is influenced by both the Vienna Convention and MUTCD. Road signs in Central America are heavily influenced by MUTCD and based on the Manual Centroamericano de Dispositivos Uniformes para el Control del Transito, a Central American Integration System (SICA) equivalent to the US MUTCD.

In 2025, the Global Forum for Road Traffic Safety (WP.1) adopted an amendment proposal, which replaced the entire text of the Convention. The proposal affects also the European Supplement Agreement and the Protocol on Road Markings.

Some major changes in the amendment are:

- a new numbering scheme for the road signs
- the abolishment of the variant B, 2b for stop signs
- the abolishment of the variant for mandatory signs with red rim and black symbols
- the inclusion of the signs from the European Supplement Agreement into the convention
- some new signs (e.g. G-25.0)
- updated example images for all road signs

The amendment entered into force on 12 November 2026, except for Chile and the Netherlands, which rejected it.

== Rules ==
=== Road signs ===
Article 2 of the Convention divides Annex 1 into 8 sections (A–H), which corresponds to 8 categories of road signs. Article 5 classifies those categories into four main classes:

- A: Danger warning signs
- Regulatory signs
  - B: Priority signs
  - C: Prohibitory and restrictive signs
  - E: Special regulation signs
- Informative signs
  - F: Information, facilities, or service signs
  - G: Other information signs
- H: Additional panels

Annex 1 specifies the general characteristics, models, symbols and dimensions of road signs. The following table highlights the most prominent signs types:

Class of sign	Shape	Ground	Border (Note: Additional contrast rims may be used at the edge to enhance conspicuity)	Size (Note: Dimensions are given as the side length for triangular and square signs, the height for the octagonal STOP sign, and the diameter for circular signs)	Symbol	Examples	Notes
A: Danger warning signs
Standard danger warning	Equilateral triangle	White or yellow	Red	0.9 m (normal), ≥0.6 m (small)	Varies; black or dark blue		
Standard danger warning	Diamond (Note: Square with one diagonal vertical)	Yellow	Black	0.6 m (normal), ≥0.4 m (small)	Varies; black or dark blue		
Level crossings	Saltire	White or yellow	Red or black	Unspecified	Red stripes (optional)		
Level crossings	Saltire	White or yellow	Black	Unspecified	RAILWAY CROSSING inscription, black		
Level crossings with multi-tracks	Saltire with a lower half-saltire	White or yellow	Red or black	Unspecified	Red stripes (optional)		
Level crossings with multi-tracks	Saltire with a lower inverted T-shape panel	White or yellow	Black	Unspecified	RAILWAY CROSSING and [number] TRACKS inscription; black		
Countdown markers to level crossings or opening bridges	Elongated vertical rectangle	White or yellow	Unspecified	Unspecified	Red oblique stripes sloping downwards towards the carriageway		
B: Priority signs
Give way sign	Inverted equilateral triangle	White or yellow	Red	0.9 m (normal), ≥0.6 m (small)	None		
Stop sign	Octagon	Red	White	0.9 m (normal), ≥0.6 m (small)	STOP (Note: May be written in English or the national language) inscription; white		
Stop sign	Circular	White or yellow	Red	0.9 m (large), 0.6 m (small)	STOP inscription; black or dark blue inside red inverted triangle		Not retained in the amended Convention
Priority road	Diamond	White	Black	0.5 m (normal), ≥0.35 m (small)	Yellow square		
Priority road	Diamond	White	Black	0.5 m (normal), ≥0.35 m (small)	Orange square		Not retained in the amended Convention
End of priority road	Diamond	White	Black	0.5 m (normal), ≥0.35 m (small)	Yellow square with black or grey diagonal lines crossing the sign		
End of priority road	Diamond	White	Black	0.5 m (normal), ≥0.35 m (small)	Orange square with black or grey diagonal lines crossing the sign		Not retained in the amended Convention
Priority for oncoming traffic	Circular	White or yellow	Red	Unspecified	Black arrow indicating direction with priority, red arrow indicating direction without		
Priority over oncoming traffic	Rectangular	Blue	None	Unspecified	White arrow indicating direction with priority, red arrow indicating direction without		
C: Prohibitory and restrictive signs
Standard prohibitory	Circular	White or yellow	Red	≥0.6 m (outside built-up areas), ≥0.4 m (built-up areas)	Varies; black or dark blue		
No entry	Circular	Red	None	≥0.6 m (outside built-up areas), ≥0.4 m (built-up areas)	Horizontal bar; white or yellow		
Closed to all vehicles in both directions	Circular	White or yellow	Red	≥0.6 m (outside built-up areas), ≥0.4 m (built-up areas)	None		
Maximum speed limit	Circular	White or yellow	Red	≥0.6 m (outside built-up areas), ≥0.4 m (built-up areas)	Maximum speed figure; black or dark blue		
End of prohibition or restriction	Circular	White or yellow	None	≥0.6 m (outside built-up areas), ≥0.4 m (built-up areas)	Black oblique band or black parallel lines forming such a band		
End of prohibition or restriction	Circular	White or yellow	None	≥0.6 m (outside built-up areas), ≥0.4 m (built-up areas)	Grey oblique band or grey parallel lines forming such a band		Not retained in the amended Convention
Parking prohibited	Circular	Blue	Red	≥0.6 m (outside built-up areas), ≥0.2 m (built-up areas)	None		
Parking prohibited	Circular	White or yellow	Red	≥0.6 m (outside built-up areas), ≥0.2 m (built-up areas)	Initial letter or ideogram to denote parking; black or dark blue		
Stopping prohibited	Circular	Blue	Red	≥0.6 m (outside built-up areas), ≥0.2 m (built-up areas)	None		
D: Mandatory signs
Standard mandatory	Circular	Blue	None, white	≥0.6 m (outside built-up areas), ≥0.4 m (built-up areas), ≥0.3 m (on traffic signals or on bollards on traffic islands)	Varies, white		
Standard mandatory	Circular	White or yellow	Red	0.6 m (large), 0.4 m (small), 0.3 m (very small)	Varies, black or dark blue		Not retained in the amended Convention
Compulsory direction for vehicles carrying dangerous goods	Rectangular	White	Unspecified	Unspecified	A dangerous-goods symbol with a compulsory-direction sign		
E: Special regulation signs
Standard special regulation	Square or rectangular	Blue	Unspecified	Unspecified	Varies, light colour		
Standard special regulation	Square or rectangular	Light	Unspecified	Unspecified	Varies, dark colour		
Motorways	Square or rectangular	Blue or green	Unspecified	Unspecified	A bridge passing over dual carriageway, white		
Road for motor vehicles	Square or rectangular	Blue or green	Unspecified	Unspecified	A front-view car silhouette, white		
Pedestrian crossing	Square or rectangular	Blue with a white or yellow triangle	Unspecified	Unspecified	A side-view walking pedestrian silhouette on a crossing marked by broad stripes, black		
F: Information, facilities or service signs
Signs without inscriptions	Square or rectangular	Blue or green	Unspecified	Unspecified	Varies, black or dark blue; on white square		
Signs with inscriptions	Rectangular	Blue or green	Unspecified	Unspecified	Varies, black or dark blue; on white square		
G: Other information signs
G1: Advance direction signs
Advance direction signs	Rectangular	Light	Unspecified	Unspecified	Varies, dark		
Advance direction signs	Rectangular	Dark	Unspecified	Unspecified	Varies, light		
G2: Direction signs
Direction signs	Rectangular, and optionally, terminating in arrowhead	Light	Unspecified	Unspecified	Varies, dark		
Direction signs	Rectangular, and optionally, terminating in arrowhead	Dark	Unspecified	Unspecified	Varies, light		
G3: Road identification signs
Road identification	Unspecified	Unspecified	Unspecified	Unspecified	Unspecified		
G4: Place identification signs
Place identification	Rectangular	Unspecified	Unspecified	Unspecified	Unspecified		
G5: Confirmatory signs
Place confirmation	Rectangular	Unspecified	Unspecified	Unspecified	Unspecified		
G6: Indication signs
Standard indication signs	Rectangular	Blue	White rim (optional)	Unspecified	Varied		
Lane formation	Rectangular	Light	Unspecified	Unspecified	Dark		
Lane formation	Rectangular	Dark	Unspecified	Unspecified	Light		
Countdown markers to motorway exits	Rectangular	Blue or green	White rim (optional)	Unspecified	White oblique stripes sloping downwards towards the carriageway and optionally with distance inscription		
Signs indicating emergency exits	Varied	Green	White rim (optional)	Unspecified	Varied, white		
Crash through gates	Rectangular	Green	White rim (optional)	Unspecified	Back view of a green car crashing through a raising arm gate, splitting it into two broken sections with a white crash symbol as background		
Temporary	Rectangular	Yellow or orange	Black rim (optional)	Unspecified	Varies, black		
H: Additional panels
All panels	Unspecified	White or yellow	Unspecified	Unspecified	Varies, black or dark blue		
All panels	Unspecified	Green or blue	Unspecified	Unspecified	Varies, white		Can only be used with mandatory, special regulations, and informative signs
Class of sign	Shape	Ground	Border	Size	Symbol	Examples	Notes

It also specifies the symbols and pictograms which may be used, and the orientations in which they may be used. When more than one is available, the same one must be used nationally. All signs, except for those that do not apply at night, must be reflective enough to be seen in darkness with headlights from a distance.

=== Road markings ===
The convention also specifies road markings. All such markings must be less than 6 mm high, with cat's eye reflectors no more than 15 mm above the road surface. The road markings shall be white or yellow.

The length and width of markings varies according to purpose, although no exact figures for size are stated; roads in built up areas should use a broken line for lane division, while continuous lines must only be used in special cases, such as reduced visibility or narrowed carriageways.

All words painted on the road surface should be either of place names, or of words recognisable in most languages, such as "Stop" or "Taxi".

=== Traffic lights ===
The Convention specifies the colours for traffic lights and their meanings, and places and purposes lights may be used for, like so:

Type	Shape	Colour	Position	Meaning
Non-flashing	Plain	Green	At intersection, entrance to tunnel or bridge	Proceed
Non-flashing	Plain	Amber	At intersection, level crossing, swing bridge, airport, fire station or ferry terminal	Stop if safe to do so
Non-flashing	Plain	Red	At intersection	Stop
Non-flashing	Plain	Red and amber	At intersection	Signal is about to change (usually to green)
Non-flashing	Arrow pointing left	Green	At intersection	Only traffic turning left may proceed
Non-flashing	Arrow pointing right	Green	At intersection	Only traffic turning right may proceed
Non-flashing	Arrow pointing upwards	Green	At intersection	Only traffic travelling straight ahead may proceed
Non-flashing	Arrow pointing downwards	Green	Above lane	Traffic may continue in lane
Non-flashing	Cross (×)	Red	Above lane	Traffic may not enter lane (lane closed)
Non-flashing	Arrow pointing diagonally downwards	Amber or white	Above lane	Lane closes shortly ahead, change lane in the direction of the arrow
Flashing	Plain	Double Red (alternating)	At level crossing, swing bridge, airport, fire station or ferry terminal	Stop
Flashing	Plain	Lunar white	At crossing	Proceed
Flashing	Plain	Amber (flashing)	Anywhere except intersection	Proceed with caution
Flashing	Plain	Amber (flashing)	At intersection	The priority is determined by Priority Route or Yield signs or if none of the above regular right of way rule.

Red flashing lights may only be used at the locations specified above; any other use of the lights is in breach of the convention. Red lights must be placed on top when lights are stacked vertically, or on the side closest to oncoming traffic if stacked horizontally.

== Contracting parties ==
As of 2026, 75 states are party to the Vienna Convention. This includes 35 of the original 37 signatories, 8 states which succeeded to the treaty following the dissolution of two of the signatories, and 44 states which acceded to the treaty after it was signed.

=== Signatory parties ===
These states negotiated and signed the Convention between 1968 and 1969:

- Austria (signed 8 November 1968, ratified 11 August 1981)
- Belarus (signed 8 November 1968, ratified 18 June 1974)
- Belgium (signed 8 November 1968, ratified 16 November 1988)
- Brazil (signed 8 November 1968, never ratified)
- Bulgaria (signed 8 November 1968, ratified 28 December 1978)
- Chile (signed 8 November 1968, ratified 27 December 1974)
- Costa Rica (signed 8 November 1968, never ratified)
- Denmark (signed 8 November 1968, ratified 3 November 1986)
- Ecuador (signed 8 November 1968, never ratified)
- Finland (signed 16 December 1969, ratified 1 April 1985)
- France (signed 8 November 1968, ratified 9 December 1971)
- Germany (signed 8 November 1968, ratified 3 August 1978)
- Ghana (signed 22 August 1969, never ratified)
- Holy See (signed 8 November 1968, never ratified)
- Hungary (signed 8 November 1968, ratified 16 March 1976)
- Indonesia (signed 8 November 1968, never ratified)
- Iran (signed 8 November 1968, ratified 21 May 1976)
- Italy (signed 8 November 1968, ratified 7 February 1997)
- Luxembourg (signed 8 November 1968, ratified 25 November 1975)
- Mexico (signed 8 November 1968, never ratified)
- Norway (signed 23 December 1969, ratified 1 April 1985)
- Philippines (signed 8 November 1968, ratified 27 December 1973)
- Poland (signed 8 November 1968, ratified 23 August 1984)
- Portugal (signed 8 November 1968, ratified 27 October 2009)
- South Korea (signed 29 December 1969, never ratified)
- Romania (signed 8 November 1968, ratified 9 December 1980)
- Russia (signed 8 November 1968, ratified 7 June 1974)
- San Marino (signed 8 November 1968, ratified 20 July 1970)
- Spain (signed 8 November 1968, never ratified)
- Sweden (signed 8 November 1968, ratified 25 July 1985)
- Switzerland (signed 8 November 1968, ratified 11 December 1991)
- Thailand (signed 8 November 1968, never ratified)
- Ukraine (signed 8 November 1968, ratified 12 July 1974)
- United Kingdom (signed 8 November 1968, never ratified)
- Venezuela (signed 8 November 1968, never ratified)

=== Succeeding parties ===
In addition to the signatory parties listed above, the 1968 Convention was also signed by Czechoslovakia and Yugoslavia. Following the dissolutions of those countries through the 1990s, the following states succeeded them as parties to the convention:

State	Date of succession	State succeeded
Czech Republic	2 June 1993	Czechoslovakia
Slovakia	28 May 1993	Czechoslovakia
Bosnia and Herzegovina	12 January 1994	Socialist Federal Republic of Yugoslavia
Croatia	2 November 1993	Socialist Federal Republic of Yugoslavia
Montenegro	23rd October 2006	Socialist Federal Republic of Yugoslavia
North Macedonia	20 December 1999	Socialist Federal Republic of Yugoslavia
Serbia	12 March 2001	Socialist Federal Republic of Yugoslavia
Slovenia	14 April 2011	Socialist Federal Republic of Yugoslavia

=== Acceding parties ===
These states were not involved in the original negotiation and signing of the Convention in 1968, but later acceded to it:

- Albania (acceded 6 February 2004)
- Andorra (acceded 25 September 2024)
- Armenia (acceded 28 June 2018)
- Azerbaijan (acceded 22 February 2011)
- Bahrain (acceded 4 May 1973)
- Benin (acceded 7 July 2022)
- Central African Republic (acceded 3 February 1988)
- Cuba (acceded 30 September 1977)
- Cyprus (acceded 16 August 2016)
- Democratic Republic of the Congo (acceded 25 July 1977)
- Egypt (acceded 15 December 2023)
- Estonia (acceded 24 August 1992)
- Georgia (acceded 15 May 2001)
- Greece (acceded 18 December 1986)
- Guyana (acceded 25 September 2008)
- India (acceded 10 March 1980)
- Iraq (acceded 18 December 1988)
- Ivory Coast (acceded 24 July 1985)
- Kazakhstan (acceded 4 April 1994)
- Kuwait (acceded 13 May 1980)
- Kyrgyzstan (acceded 30 August 2006)
- Latvia (acceded 19 October 1992)
- Liberia (acceded 16 September 2005)
- Liechtenstein (acceded 2 March 2020)
- Lithuania (acceded 20 November 1991)
- Maldives (acceded 9 January 2023)
- Mongolia (acceded 19 December 1997)
- Morocco (acceded 29 December 1982)
- Myanmar (acceded 26 June 2019)
- Netherlands (acceded 8 November 2007)
- Nigeria (acceded 3 February 2011)
- Pakistan (acceded 14 January 1980)
- Moldova (acceded 8 October 2015)
- Saudi Arabia (acceded 31 March 2022)
- Senegal (acceded 19 April 1972)
- Seychelles (acceded 11 April 1977)
- Tajikistan (acceded 9 March 1994)
- Tunisia (acceded 5 January 2004)
- Turkey (acceded 17 May 2023)
- Turkmenistan (acceded 14 June 1993)
- Uganda (acceded 23 August 2022)
- United Arab Emirates (acceded 10 January 2007)
- Uzbekistan (acceded 17 January 1995)
- Vietnam (acceded 20 August 2014)

== Global influence ==
Some states which are not formally party to the Convention nonetheless use road signage based on its designs. For example, although Hong Kong is not a signatory, its Highways Department prepared the Transport Planning and Design Manual with reference to the UK Traffic Signs Regulations and General Directions of 1975 and 1981, which are themselves based on the Convention on Road Traffic and Road Signs and Signals (Vienna, 1968), as well as the European Agreement (Geneva, 1971) and the Protocol on Road Markings (Geneva, 1973). The Southern African Development Community has developed a single system of road signs for use by its members, which are also based on the signs in the Vienna Convention.

== See also ==
- Comparison of European road signs
- Comparison of MUTCD-influenced traffic signs
- Comparison of traffic signs in English-speaking countries
