= Priority =

Prioritization is an action that arranges items or activities in order of importance.

Priority may refer specifically to:

== Law ==
- Priority or right of way on the road, see Traffic § Priority (right of way)
  - Priority signs, a traffic sign that specifies which route has the right of way
- Priority date, a concept of establishing waiting times in the immigration process by United States Department of State
- Priority right, a time-limited right, triggered by the first filing of an application for a patent
- Subordination (finance), the order of priorities in claims for ownership or interest in various assets

== Music ==
- Priority (Pointer Sisters album)
- Priority (Imperials album), 1980
- Priorities, the debut album by Bedfordshire-based rock band Don Broco
- "Priority", a song by Jolin Tsai from the 2004 album Castle
- "Priority", a song by SM Town from the 2022 album 2022 Winter SM Town: SMCU Palace
- Priority Records, a record label started in 1985 and acquired by Capitol Records

== Science and technology ==
- Scheduling priority, the way computing processes are assigned priorities in a run queue
- Priority, a tag or attribute of a requirement in software or systems engineering
- Priority of the scientific names of organisms, including:
  - Priority (biology) in biological taxonomy, the principle that the oldest available name for a biological taxon is the valid one
  - In botanical nomenclature
  - In zoological nomenclature
- Priority number, given to each functional group in IUPAC organic nomenclature
- Scientific priority, the priority of scientific ideas

== Other uses ==
- Priority (fencing), a scoring criterion in the sport of fencing
- Priority level, the priority of emergency communications
- Priority mail, a service of the US Postal Service

== See also ==
- Preemption (disambiguation)
- Preference
