= VVIP =

VVIP may refer to:

- Very very important person
- VVIP (hip-hop group)
- V.V.I.P, a 2011 EP by Seungri
