= Traffic sign =

Signboard displaying information for road users

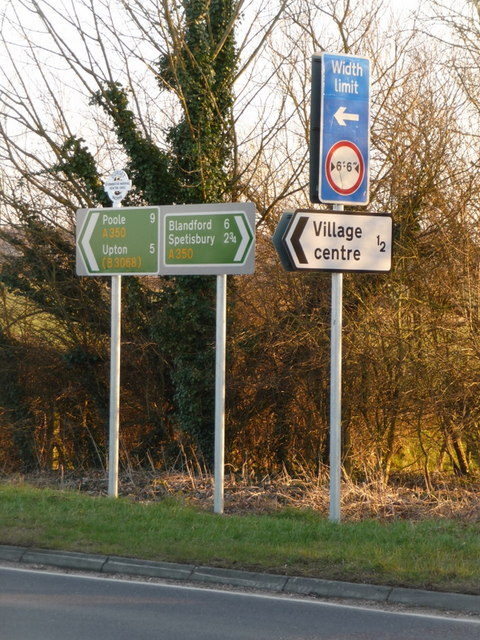
Fingerposts and other road signage in the English village of Sturminster Marshall, near Poole

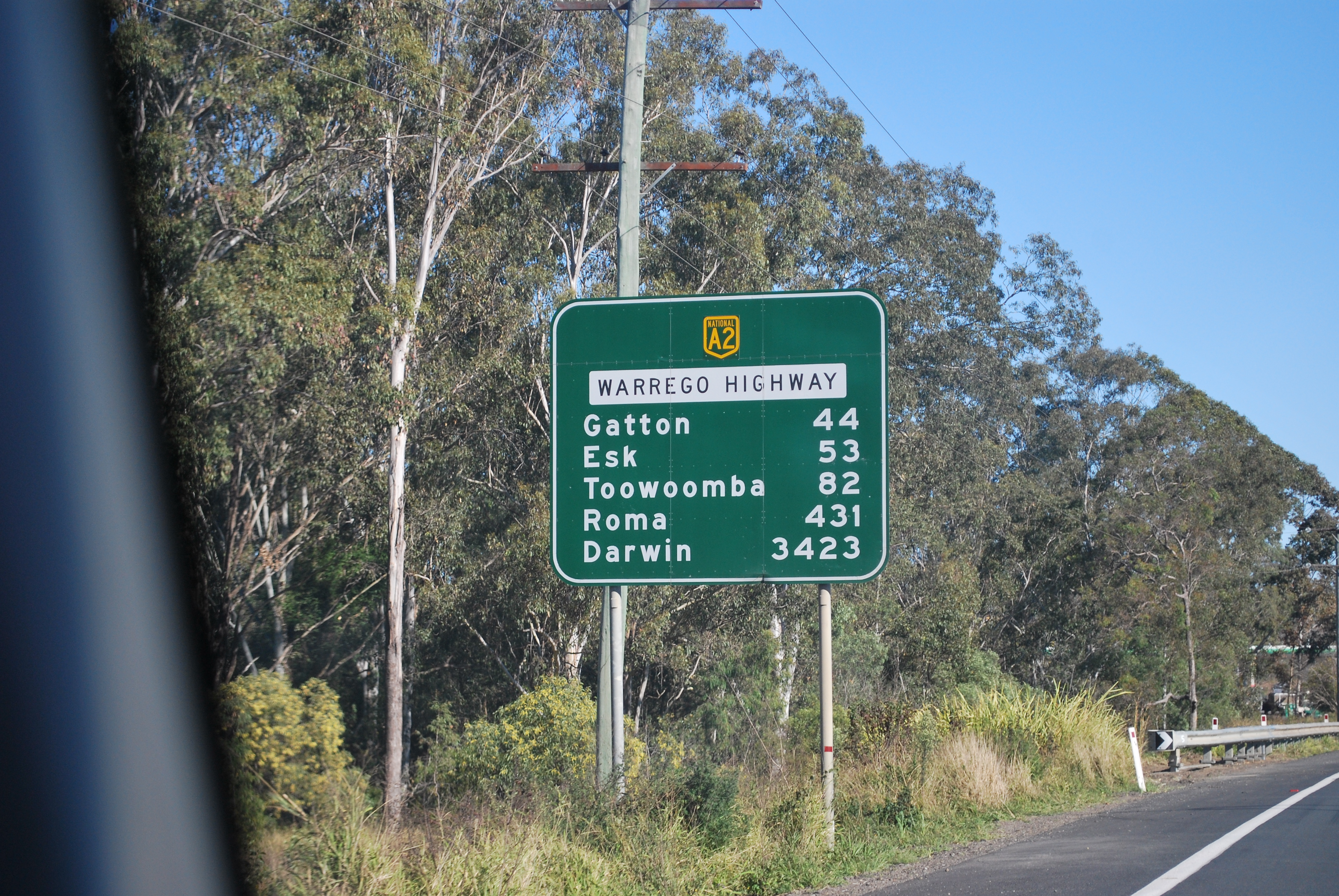
A route confirmation sign on the Warrego Highway in Queensland, Australia, informing motorists of their distance (in kilometres) from the places listed

Traffic signs or road signs are signs erected at the side of or above roads to give instructions or provide information to road users. The earliest signs were simple wooden or stone milestones. Later, signs with directional arms were introduced, for example the fingerposts in the United Kingdom and their wooden counterparts in Saxony.

With traffic volumes increasing since the 1930s, many countries have adopted pictorial signs or otherwise simplified and standardized their signs to overcome language barriers, and enhance traffic safety. Such pictorial signs use symbols (often silhouettes) in place of words and are usually based on international protocols. Such signs were first developed in Europe, and have been adopted by most countries to varying degrees.

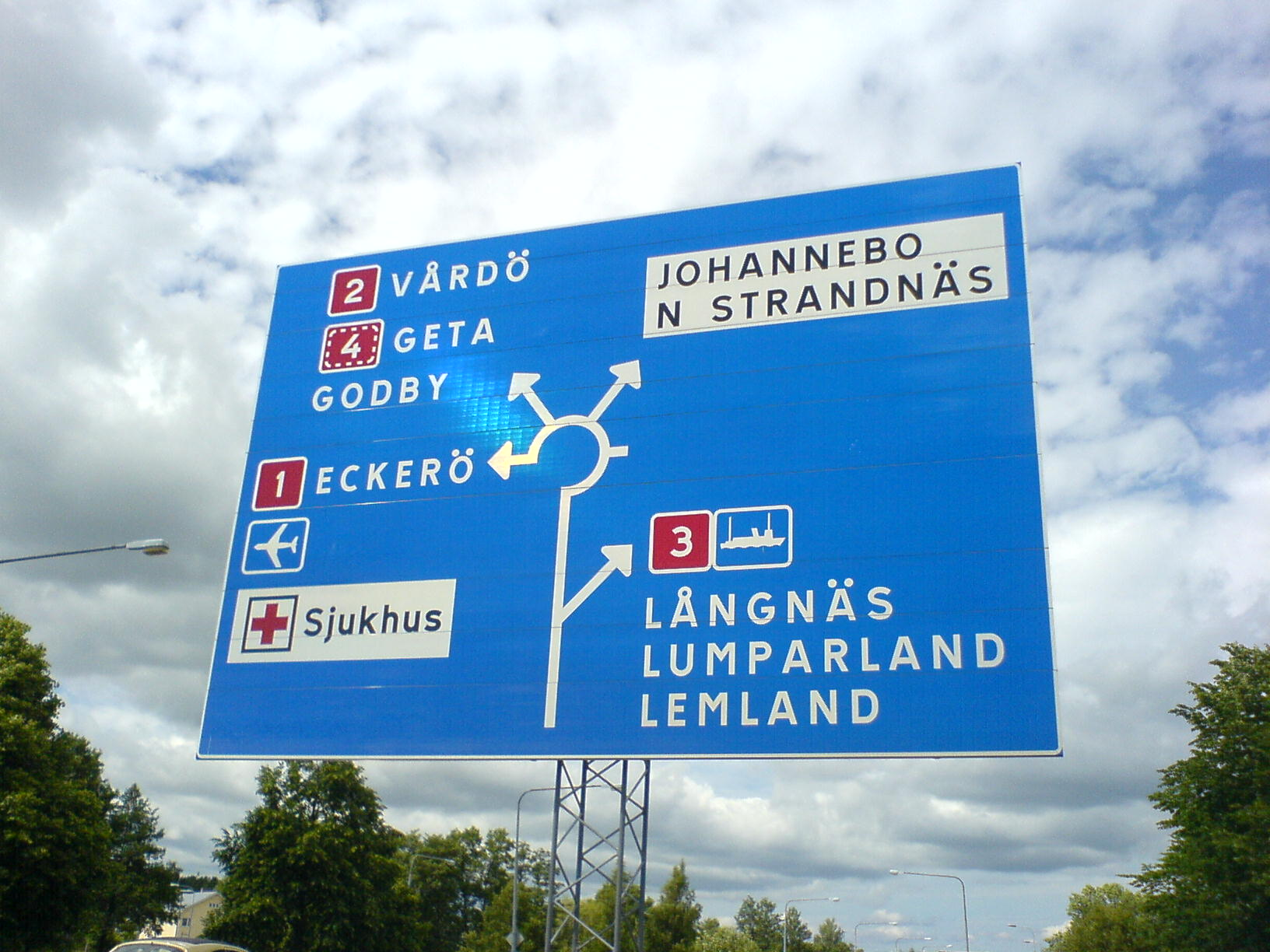
Road sign for roundabout leading to highways 1, 2 and 3 in Mariehamn, Åland

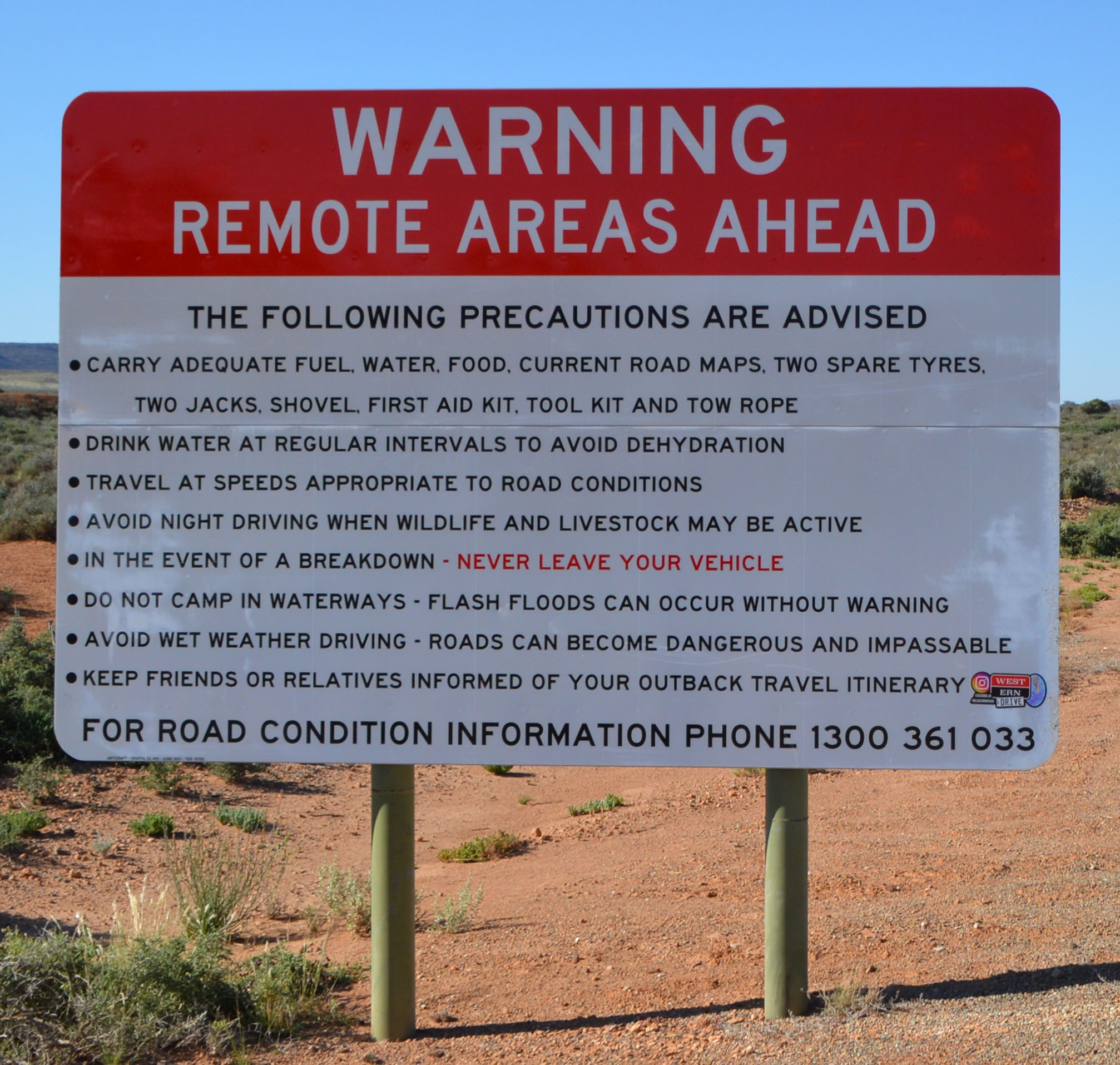
Sign in Australia reminding drivers to carry adequate supplies before entering remote areas

== International conventions ==
International conventions such as the Vienna Conventions on Road Signs and Signals and Road Traffic have helped to achieve a degree of uniformity in traffic signing in various countries. Countries have also unilaterally (to some extent) followed other countries in order to avoid confusion.

== Categories ==
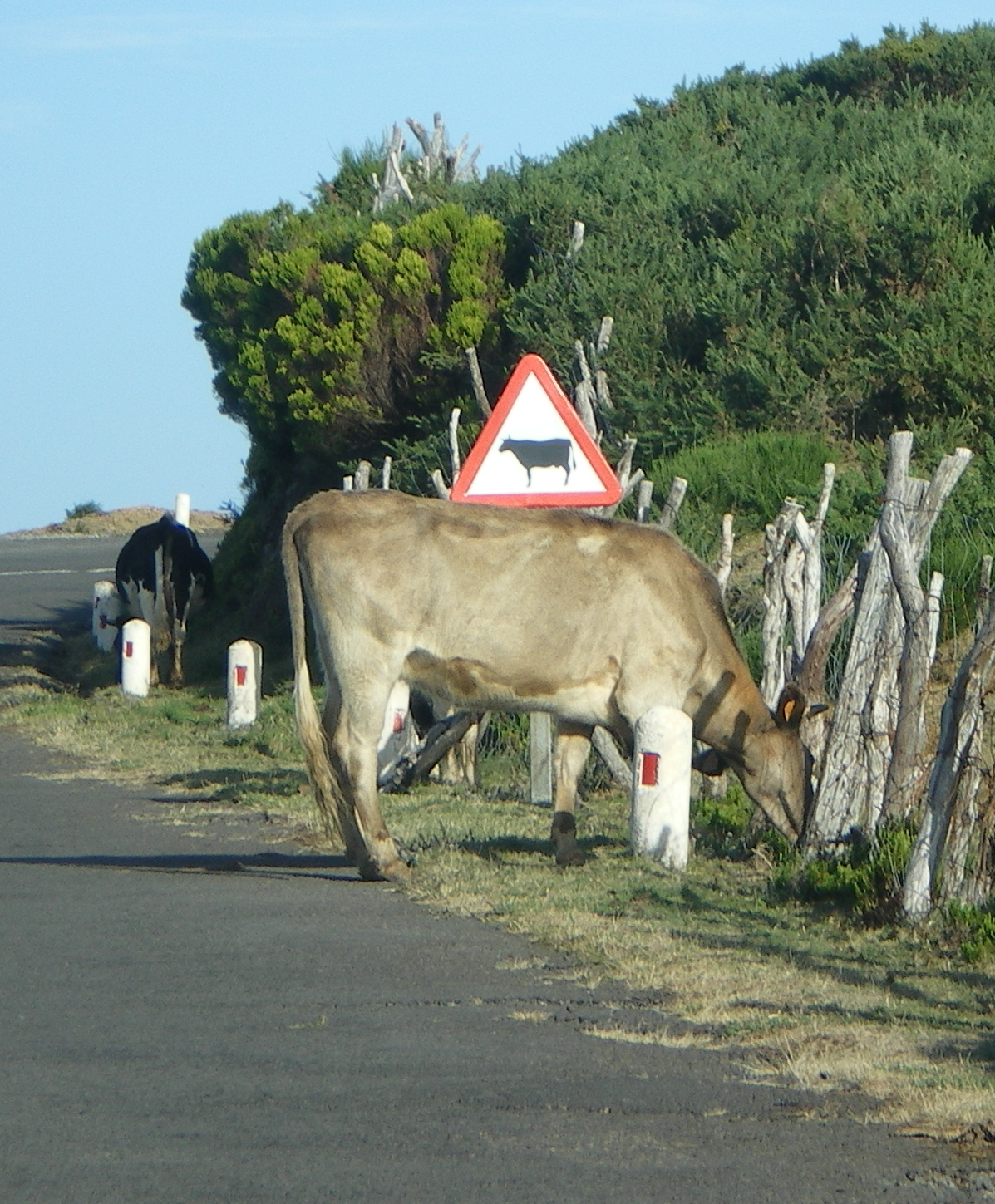
Sign warning of cattle crossing in a rural road of Madeira Island, Portugal

Traffic signs can be grouped into several types. For example, Annexe 1 of the Vienna Convention on Road Signs and Signals (1968), which on 30 June 2004 had 52 signatory countries, defines eight categories of signs:

- A. Danger warning signs
- B. Priority signs
- C. Prohibitory or restrictive signs
- D. Mandatory signs
- E. Special regulation signs
- F. Information, facilities, or service signs
- G. Direction, position, or indication signs
- H. Additional panels

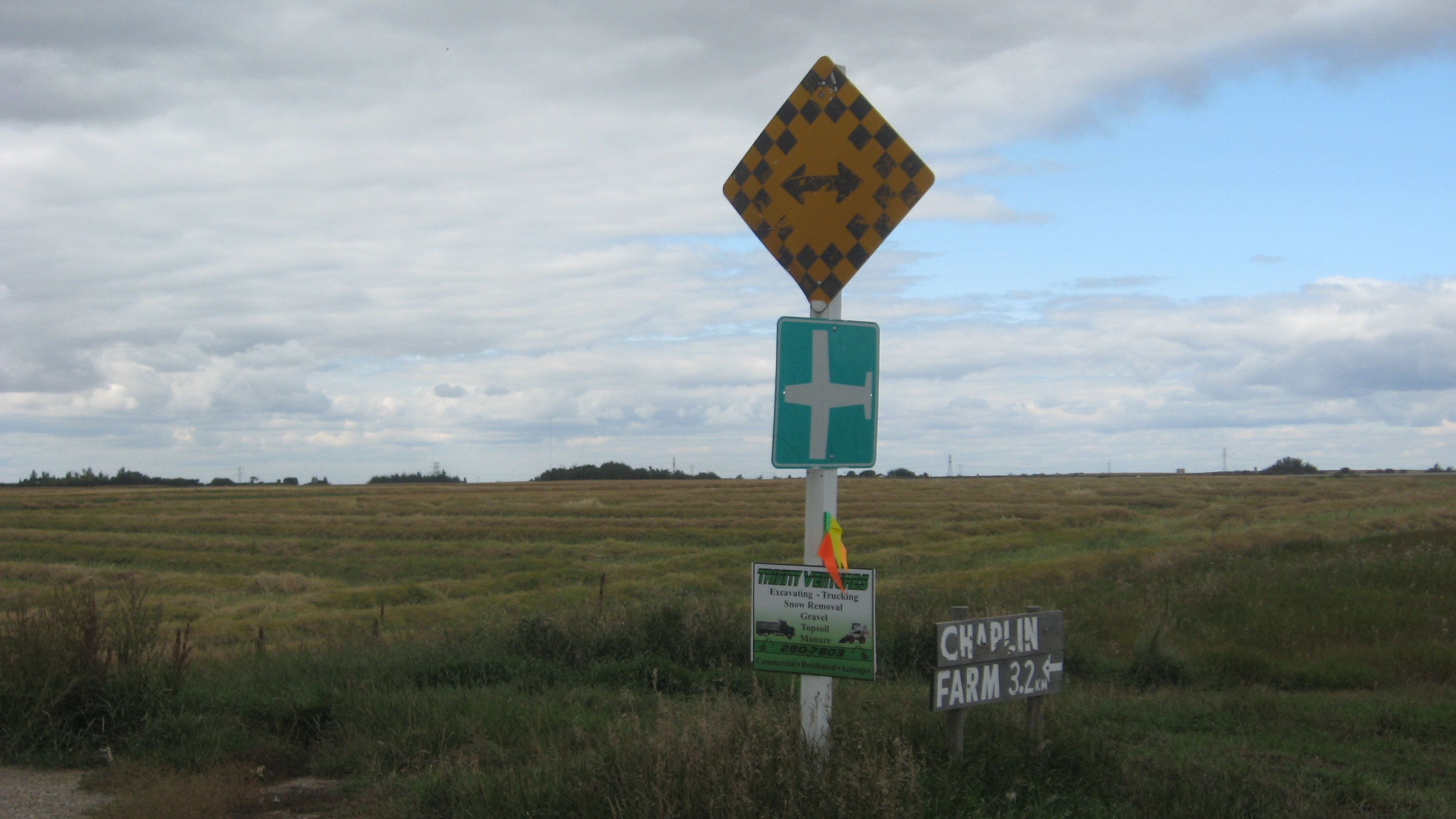
Five or more signs may be displayed on one post. Here a Canadian end-of-road marker appears together with a rural airport sign.

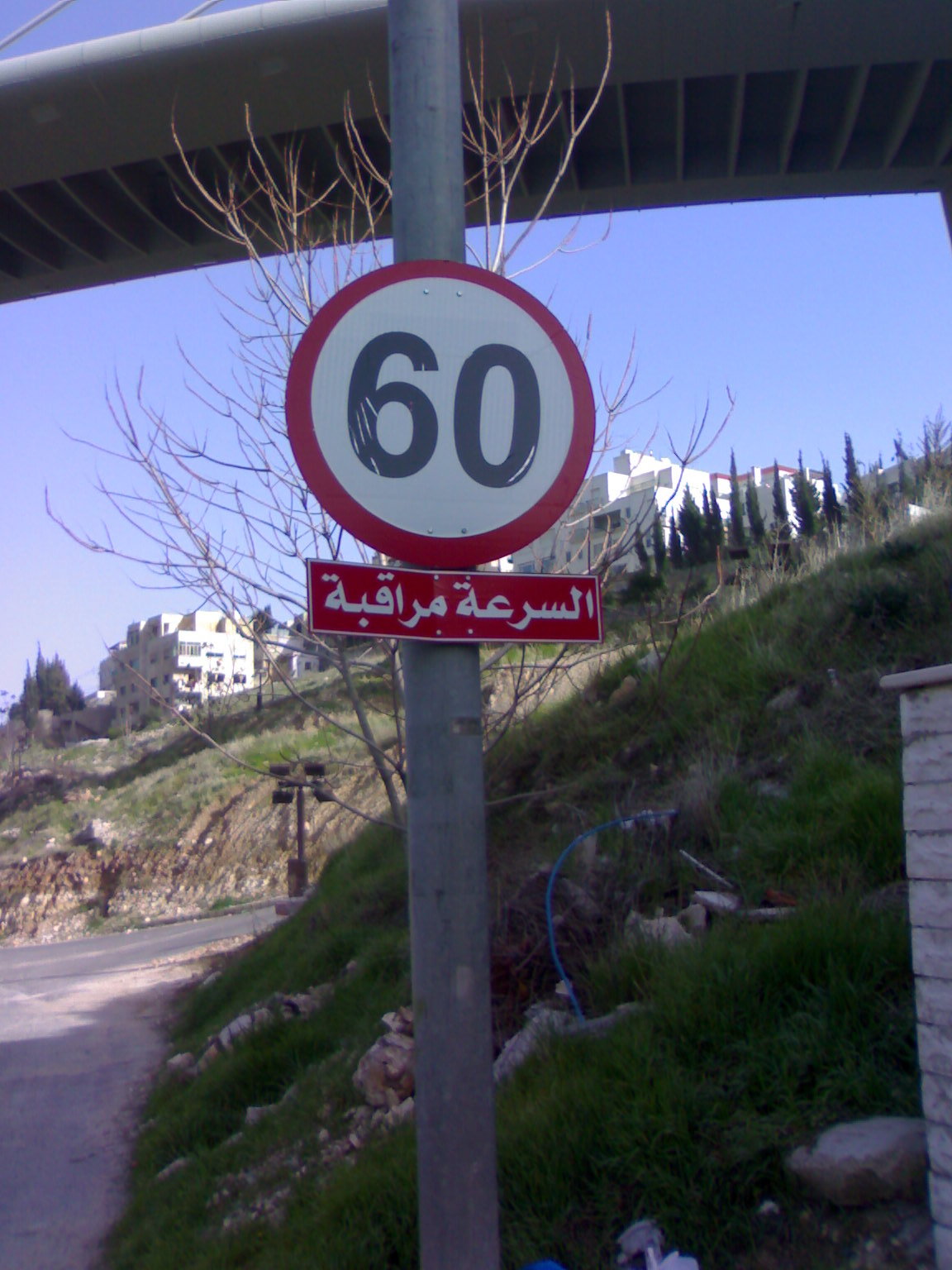
Speed limit traffic sign in Jordan

In the United States, Canada, Australia, and New Zealand signs are categorized as follows:

- Regulatory signs
- Warning signs
- Guide signs
  - Street name signs
  - Route marker signs
  - Expressway signs
  - Freeway signs
  - Welcome signs
  - Informational signs
  - Recreation and cultural interest signs
- Emergency management (civil defense) signs
- Temporary traffic control (construction or work zone) signs
- School signs
- Railroad and light rail signs
- Bicycle signs

In the United States, the categories, placement, and graphic standards for traffic signs and pavement markings are legally defined in the Federal Highway Administration's Manual on Uniform Traffic Control Devices as the standard.

A rather informal distinction among the directional signs is the one between advance directional signs, interchange directional signs, and reassurance signs. Advance directional signs appear at a certain distance from the interchange, giving information for each direction. A number of countries do not give information for the road ahead (so-called "pull-through" signs), and only for the directions left and right. Advance directional signs enable drivers to take precautions for the exit (e.g., switch lanes, double check whether this is the correct exit, slow down). They often do not appear on lesser roads, but are normally posted on expressways and motorways, as drivers would be missing exits without them. While each nation has its own system, the first approach sign for a motorway exit is mostly placed at least 1,000 metres (3,300 ft) from the actual interchange. After that sign, one or two additional advance directional signs typically follow before the actual interchange itself.

== History ==
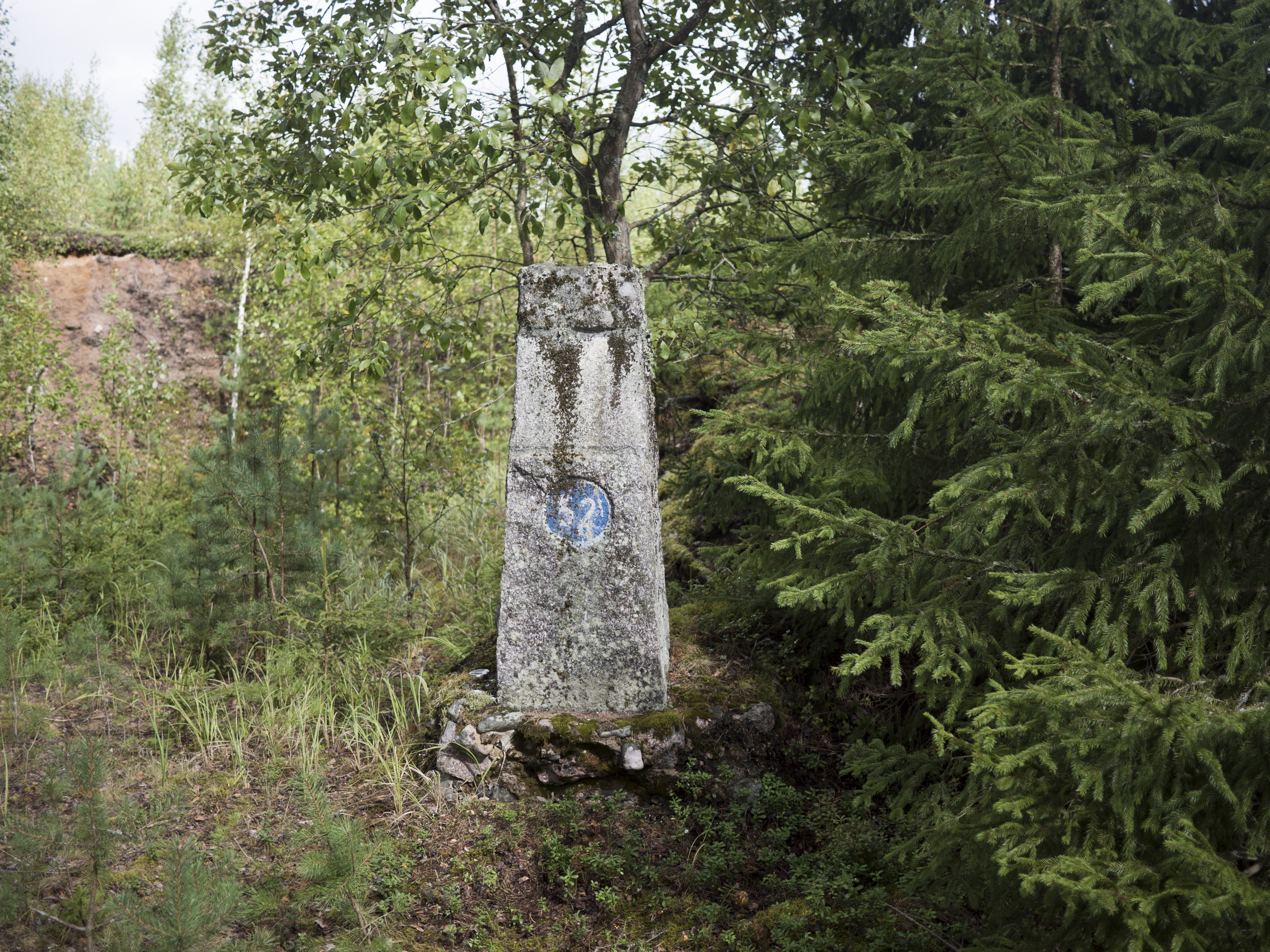
An old road sign of the King's Road between Perniö and Ekenäs in Finland

The earliest road signs were milestones, giving distance or direction; for example, the Romans erected stone columns throughout their empire giving the distance to Rome. According to Strabo, Mauryas erected signboards at distance of 10 stades to mark their roads. In the Middle Ages, multidirectional signs at intersections became common, giving directions to cities and towns.

In 1686, the first known Traffic Regulation Act in Europe was established by King Peter II of Portugal. This act foresaw the placement of priority signs in the narrowest streets of Lisbon, stating which traffic should back up to give way. One of these signs still exists at Salvador street, in the neighborhood of Alfama.

The first modern road signs erected on a wide scale were designed for riders of high or "ordinary" bicycles in the late 1870s and early 1880s. These machines were fast, silent and their nature made them difficult to control, moreover their riders travelled considerable distances and often preferred to tour on unfamiliar roads. For such riders, cycling organizations began to erect signs that warned of potential hazards ahead (particularly steep hills), rather than merely giving distance or directions to places, thereby contributing the sign type that defines "modern" traffic signs.

The development of automobiles encouraged more complex signage systems using more than just text-based notices. One of the first modern-day road sign systems was devised by the Italian Touring Club in 1895. By 1900, a Congress of the International League of Touring Organizations in Paris was considering proposals for standardization of road signage. In 1903 the British government introduced four "national" signs based on shape, but the basic patterns of most traffic signs were set in 1909, when nine European governments agreed on the use of four pictorial symbols, indicating "bump", "curve", "intersection", and "grade-level railroad crossing". The intensive work on international road signs that took place between 1926 and 1949 eventually led to the development of the European road sign system. Both Britain and the United States developed their own road signage systems, both of which were adopted or modified by many other nations in their respective spheres of influence. The United Kingdom adopted a version of the European road signs in 1964 and, over past decades, North American signage began using some symbols and graphics mixed in with English.

In the U.S., the first road signs were erected by the American Automobile Association (AAA). Starting in 1906, regional AAA clubs began paying for and installing wooden signs to help motorists find their way. In 1914, AAA started a cohesive transcontinental signage project, installing more than 4,000 signs in one stretch between Los Angeles and Kansas City alone.

Over the years, change was gradual. Pre-industrial signs were stone or wood, but with the development of Darby's method of smelting iron using coke-painted cast iron became favoured in the late 18th and 19th centuries. Cast iron continued to be used until the mid-20th century, but it was gradually displaced by aluminium or other materials and processes, such as vitreous enamelled and/or pressed malleable iron, or (later) steel. Since 1945 most signs have been made from sheet aluminium with adhesive plastic coatings; these are normally retroreflective for nighttime and low-light visibility. Before the development of reflective plastics, reflectivity was provided by glass reflectors set into the lettering and symbols.

New generations of traffic signs based on electronic displays can also change their text (or, in some countries, symbols) to provide for "intelligent control" linked to automated traffic sensors or remote manual input. In over 20 countries, real-time Traffic Message Channel incident warnings are conveyed directly to vehicle navigation systems using inaudible signals carried via FM radio, 3G cellular data and satellite broadcasts. Finally, cars can pay tolls and trucks pass safety screening checks using video numberplate scanning, or RFID transponders in windshields linked to antennae over the road, in support of on-board signalling, toll collection, and travel time monitoring.

Yet another "medium" for transferring information ordinarily associated with visible signs is RIAS (Remote Infrared Audible Signage), e.g., "talking signs" for print-handicapped (including blind/low-vision/illiterate) people. These are infra-red transmitters serving the same purpose as the usual graphic signs when received by an appropriate device such as a hand-held receiver or one built into a cell phone.

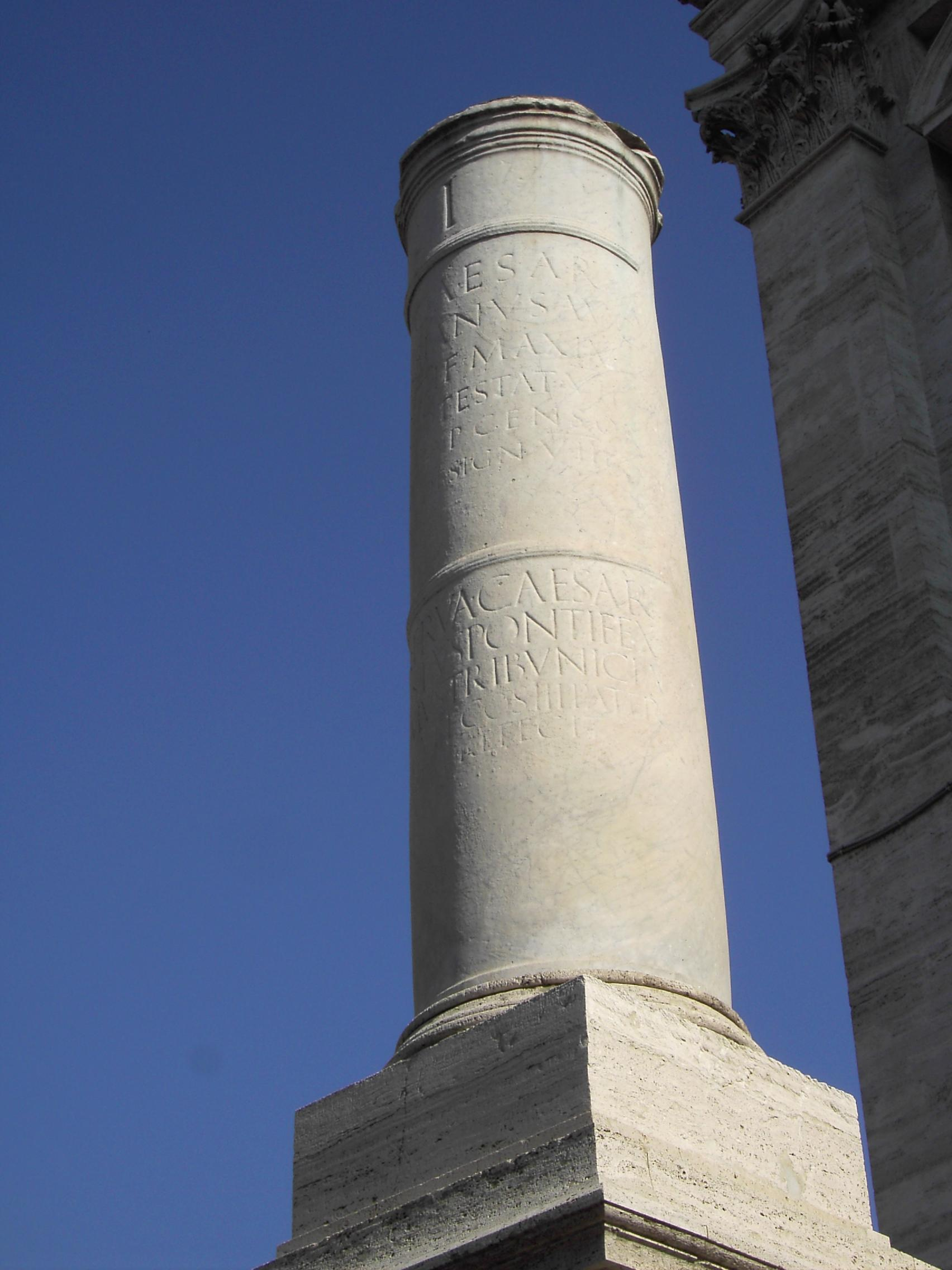
Roman milestone

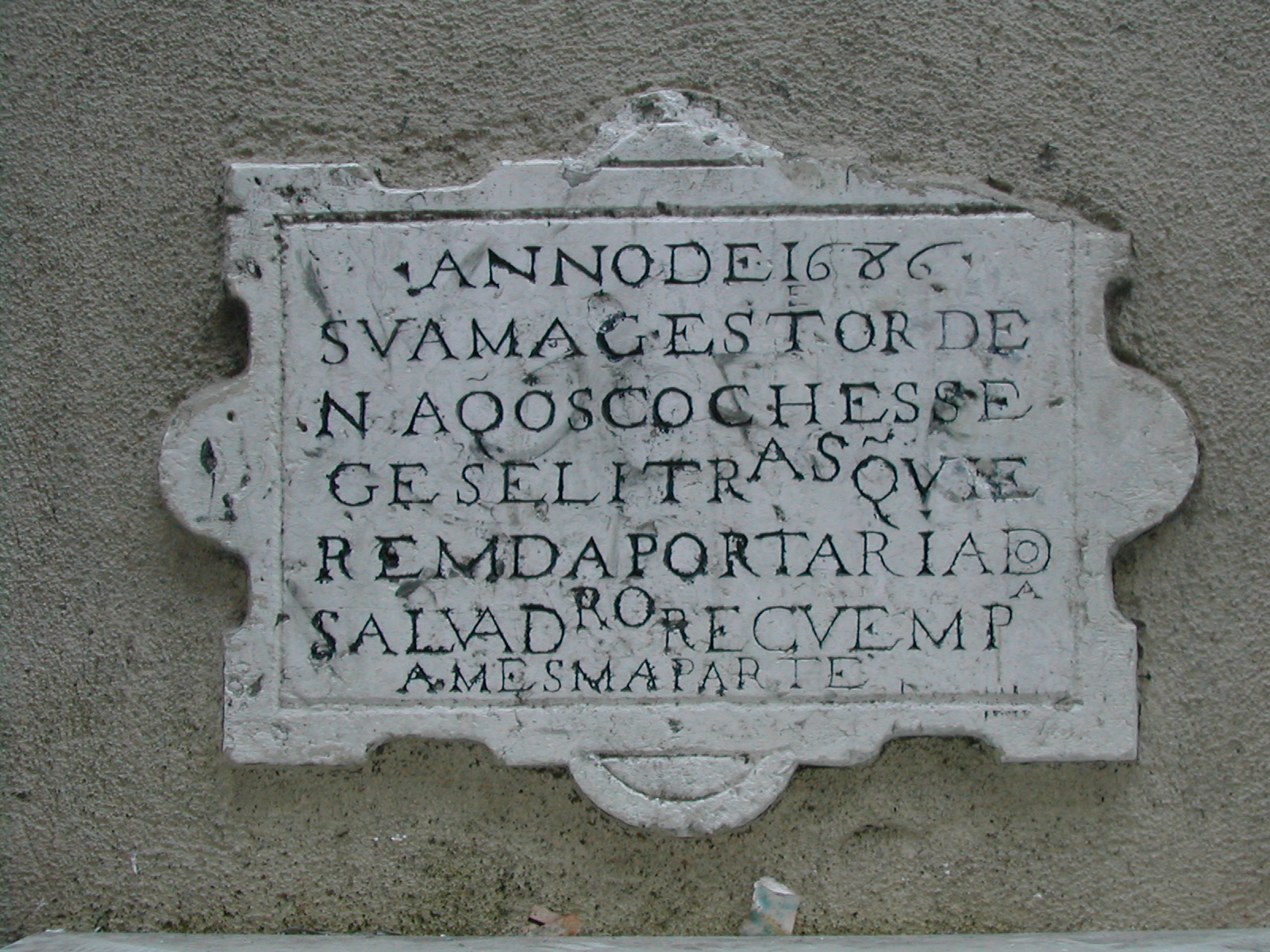
17th century traffic sign in Salvador street, Lisbon, Portugal stating which traffic should back up to give way:
Year of 1686. His Majesty commands all coaches, carriages and litters coming from Salvador's entrance to back up to the same part

== Typefaces ==
Typefaces used on traffic signs vary by location, with some typefaces being designed specifically for the purpose of being used on traffic signs and based on attributes that aid viewing from a distance. A typeface chosen for a traffic sign is selected based on its readability, which is essential for conveying information to drivers quickly and accurately at high speeds and long distances.

Factors such as clear letterforms, lines of copy, appropriate spacing, and simplicity contribute to readability. Increased X-height and counters specifically help with letter distinction and reduced halation, which especially affects aging drivers. In cases of halation, certain letters can blur and look like others, such as a lowercase "e" appearing as an "a", "c", or "o".

=== Dispute of standard typefaces for North American traffic signs ===
In 1997, a design team at T.D. Larson Transportation Institute began testing Clearview, a typeface designed to improve readability and halation issues with the FHWA Standard Alphabet, also known as Highway Gothic, which is the standard typeface for highway signs in the U.S.

The adoption of Clearview for traffic signs over Highway Gothic has been slow since its initial proposal. Country-wide adoption faced resistance from both local governments and the Federal Highway Administration (FHWA), citing concerns about consistency and cost, along with doubts of the studies done on Clearview's improved readability. As stated by the FHWA, "This process (of designing Clearview) did not result in a necessarily better set of letter styles for highway signing, but rather a different set of letter styles with increased letter height and different letter spacing that was not comparable to the Standard Alphabets."

The FHWA allowed use of Clearview to be approved on an interim basis as opposed to national change, where local governments could decide to submit a request to the FHWA for approval to update their signs with Clearview, but in 2016 they rescinded this approval, wanting to limit confusion and inconsistency that could come from a mix of two typefaces being used. In 2018, they again allowed interim approval of Clearview, with Highway Gothic remaining the standard.

== Automatic traffic sign recognition ==
Cars are beginning to feature cameras with automatic traffic sign recognition, beginning 2008 with the Opel Insignia. It mainly recognizes speed limits and no-overtaking areas. It also uses GPS and a database over speed limits, which is useful in the many countries which signpost city speed limits with a city name sign, not a speed limit sign.

== Gallery ==
No vehicles carrying explosives

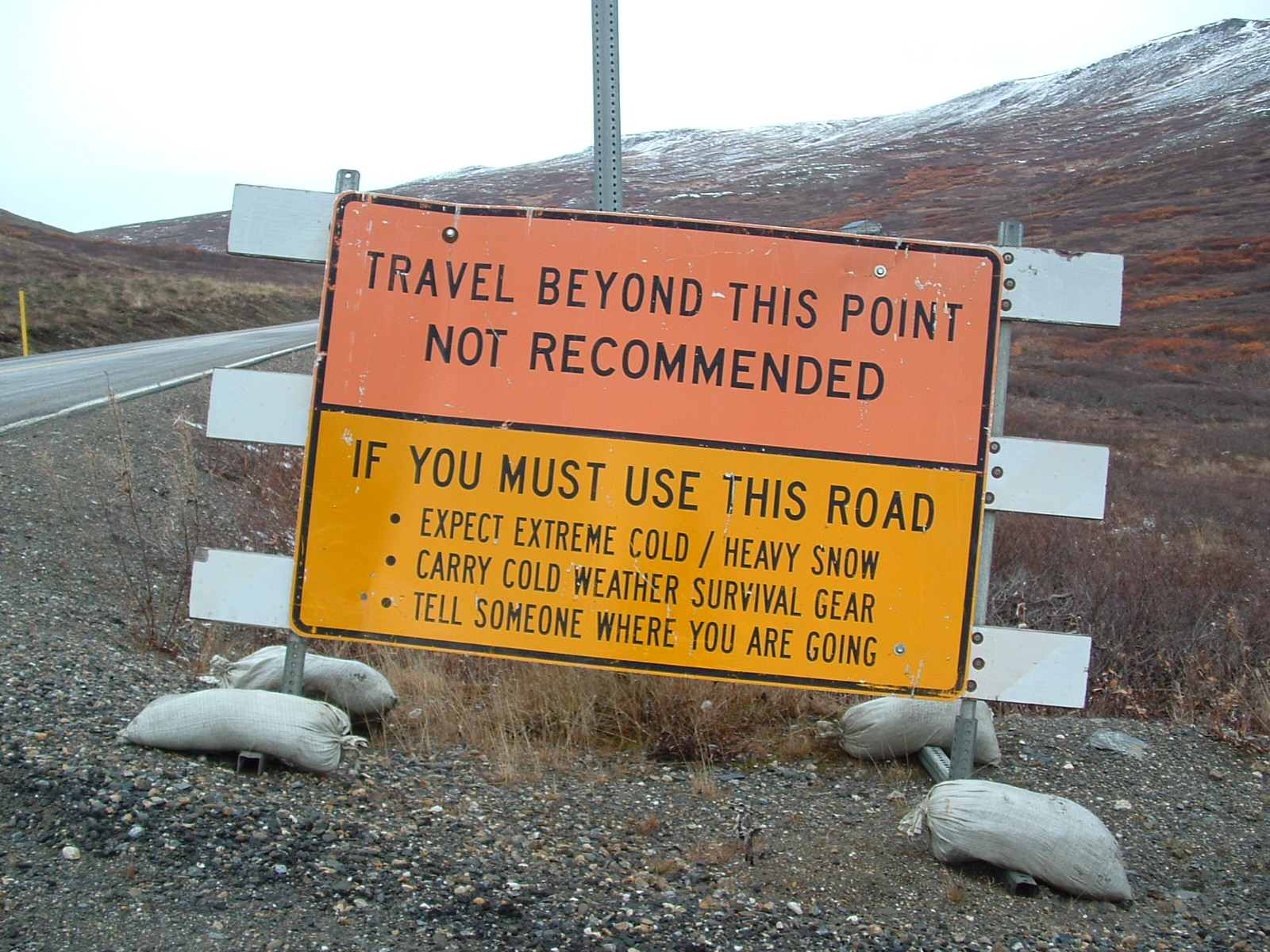
Sign north of Nome, Alaska, providing warning of the road, unpopulated area beyond

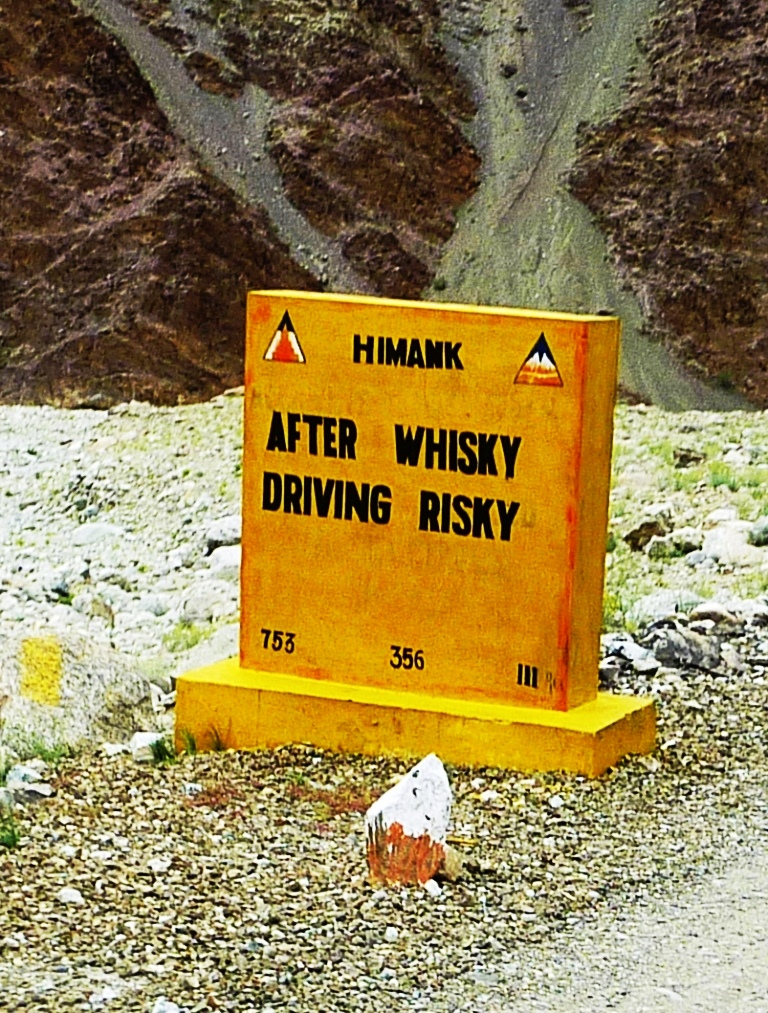
Humorous Himank sign in Lahaul, India

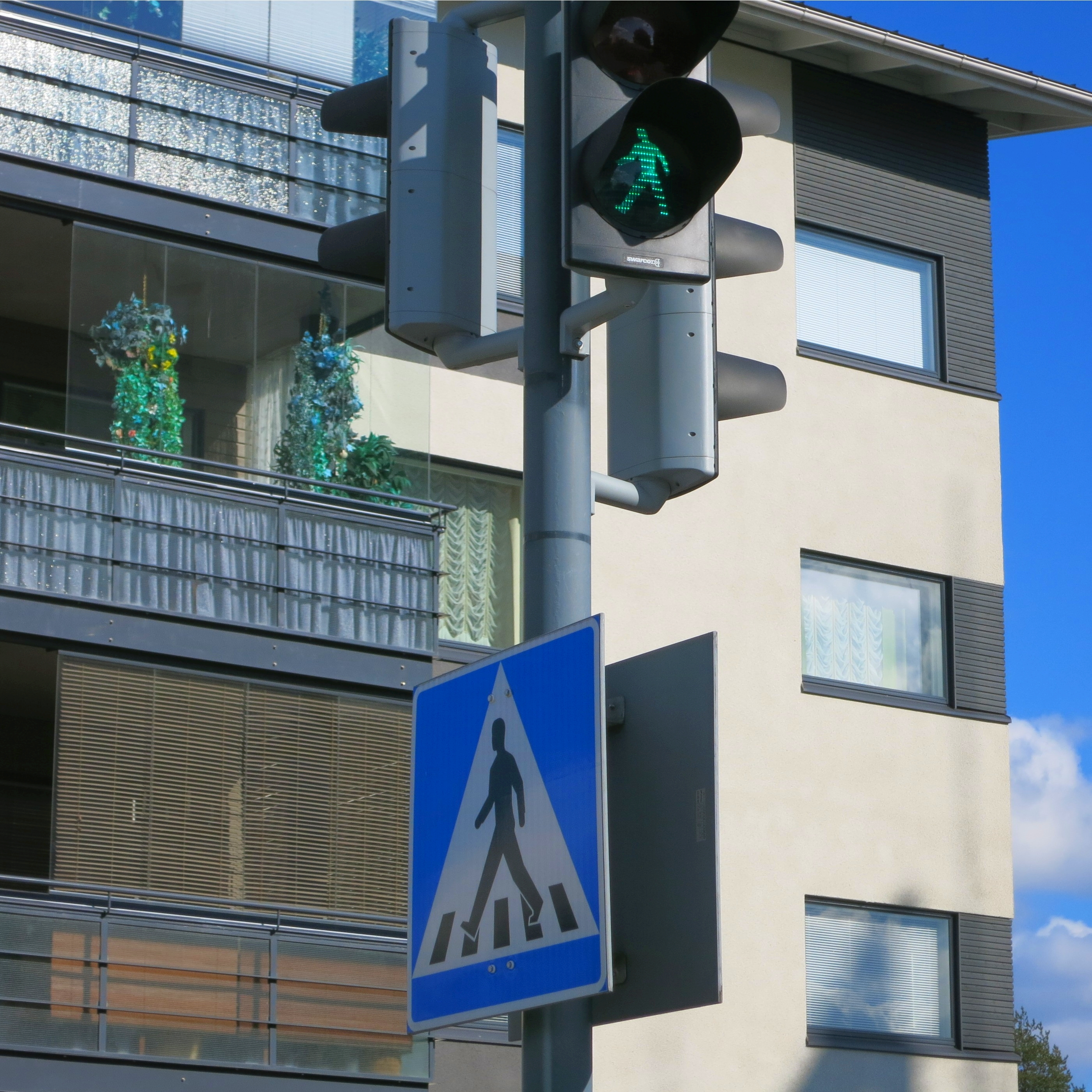
Pedestrian crossing sign in Finland

A sign for wild animals such as deer

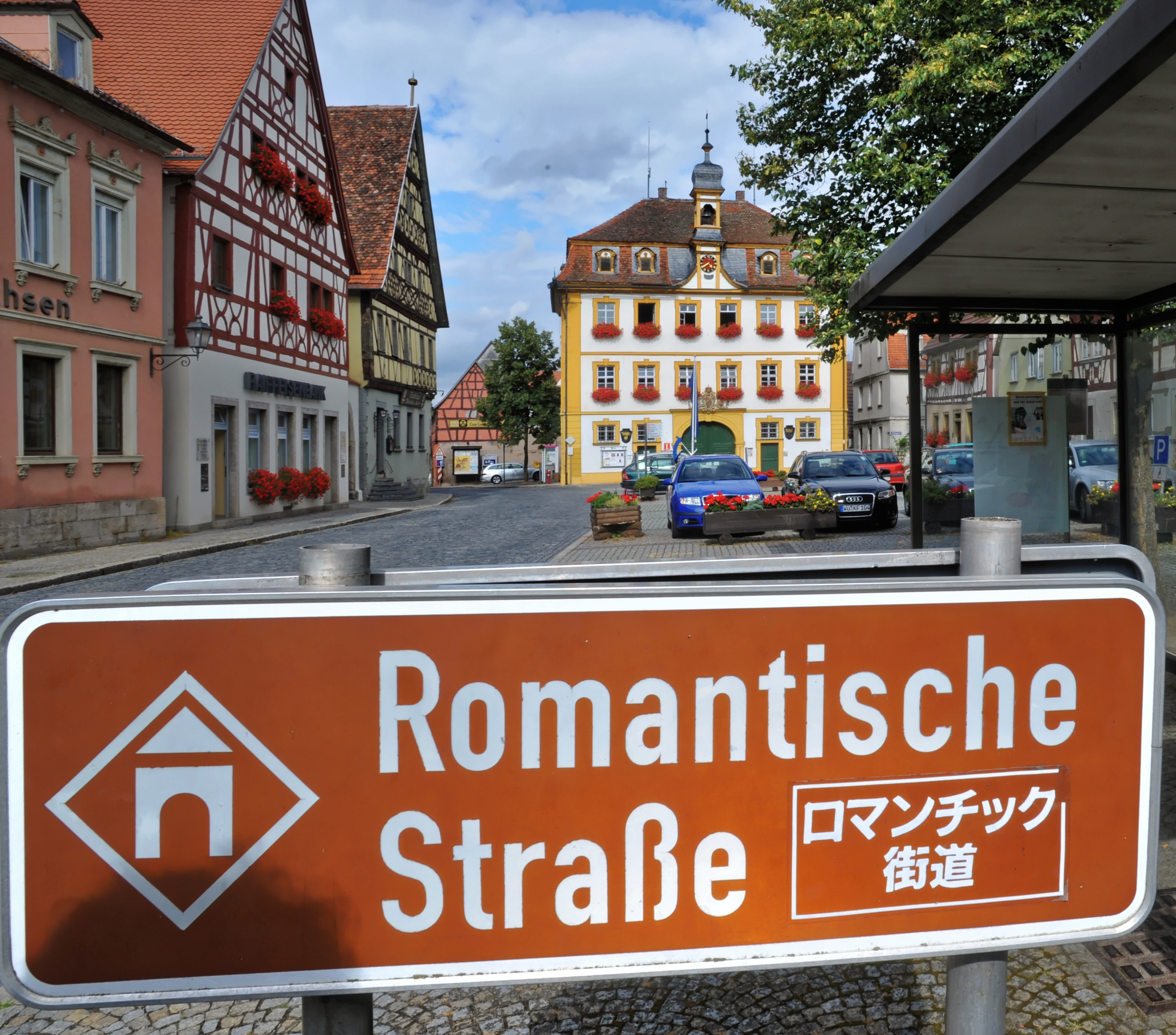
Romantic Road sign in southern Germany

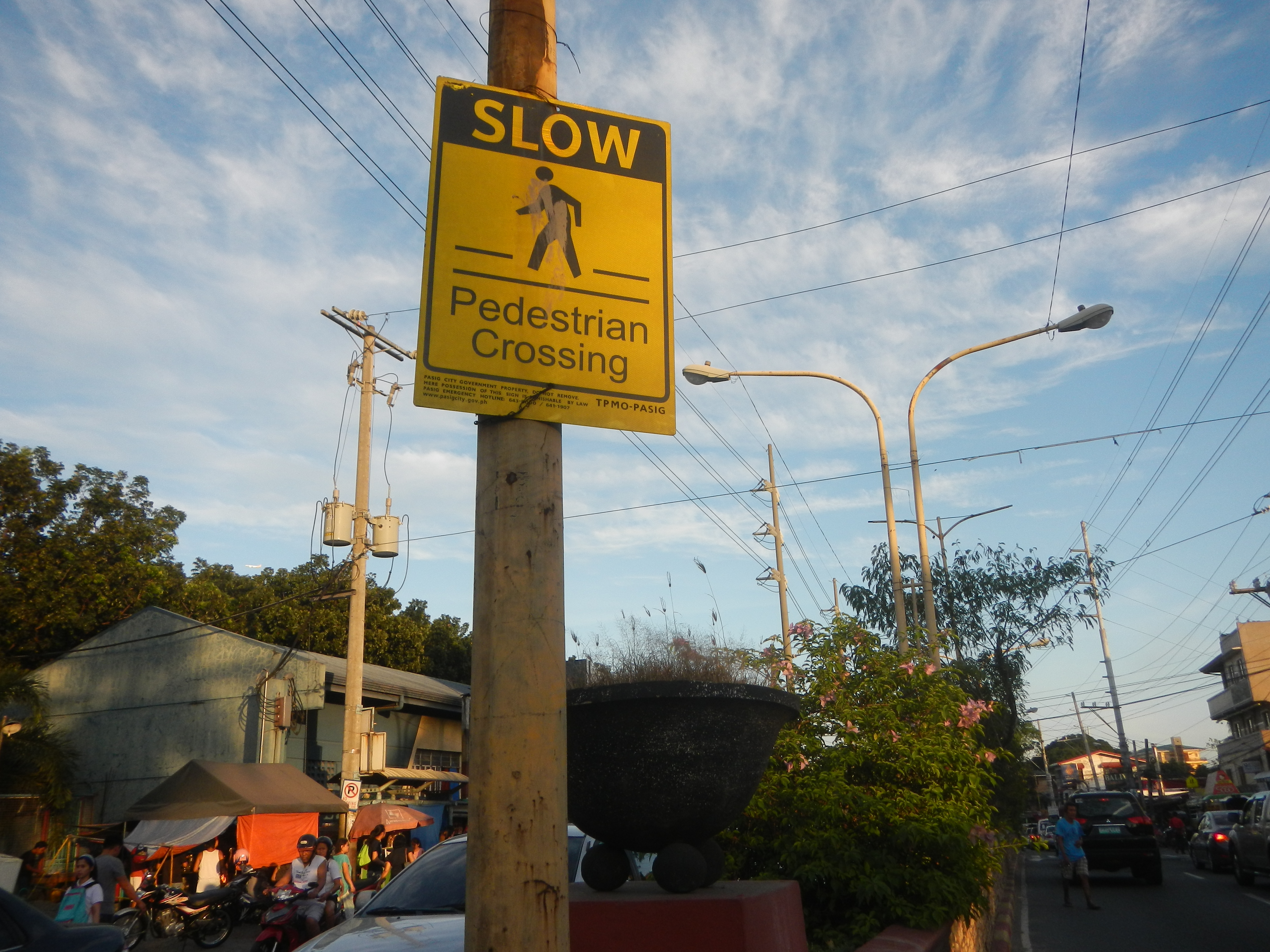
Pedestrian crossing Slow sign in Buting, Pasig, Philippines

A Turkish motorway mileage sign

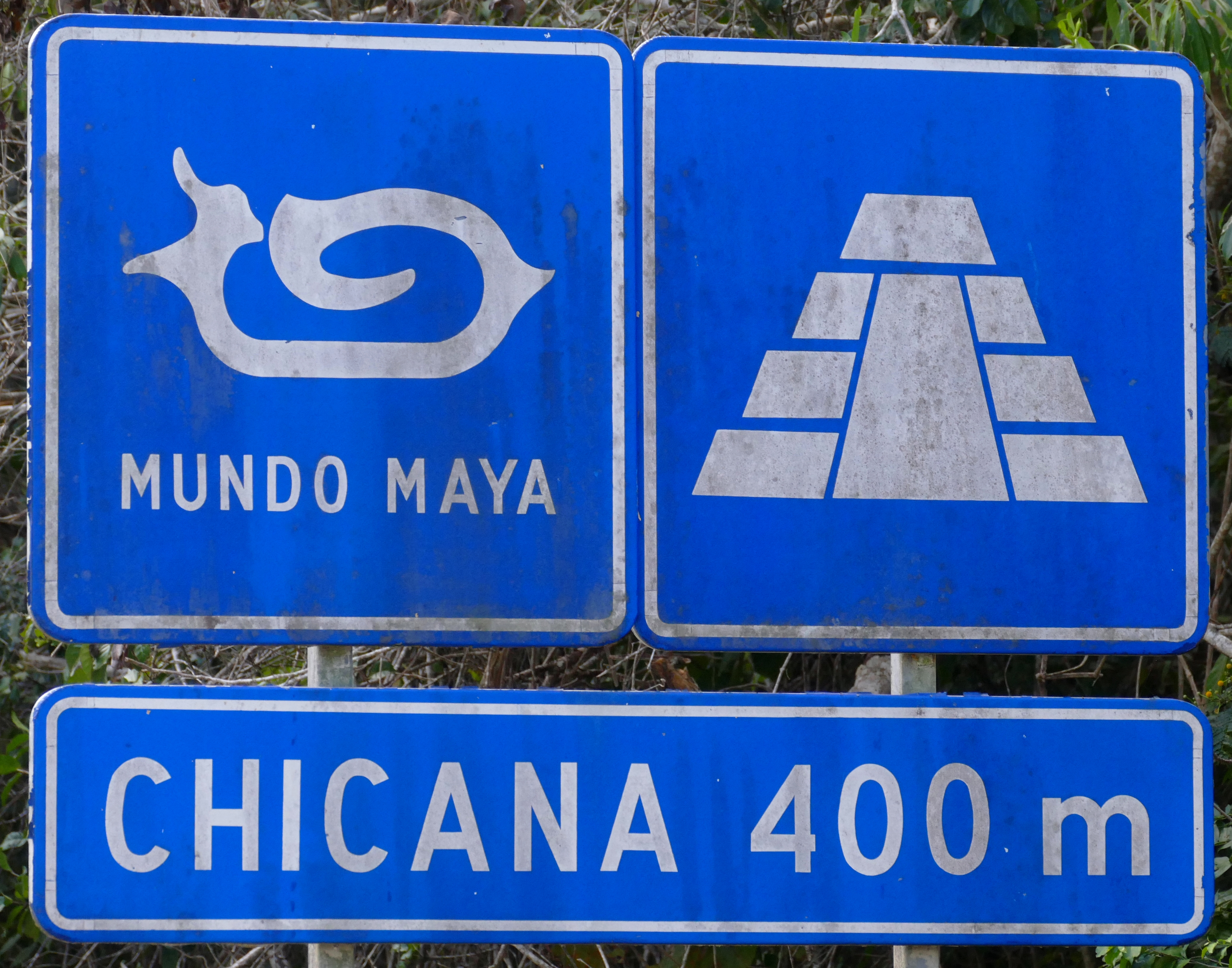
Sign close to Chicana on the Mexican Federal Highway 186, Campeche, Mexico

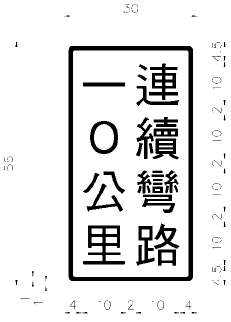
The design specifications for a Taiwanese sign warning of double bends ahead. Translated directly, it means that there are winding roads for the next ten kilometres.

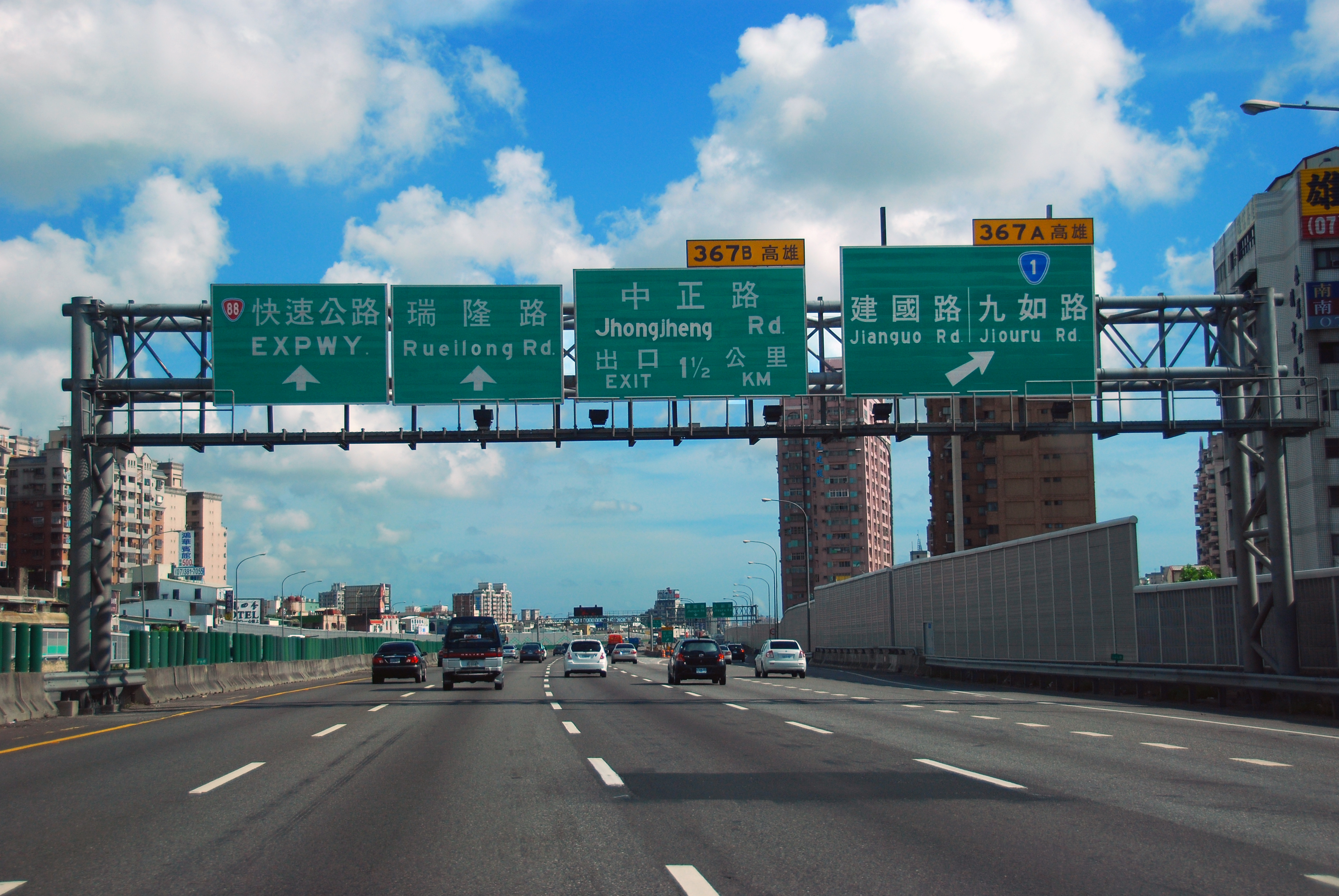
A group of green-coloured directional signs on the National Highway No. 1 in Kaohsiung, Taiwan

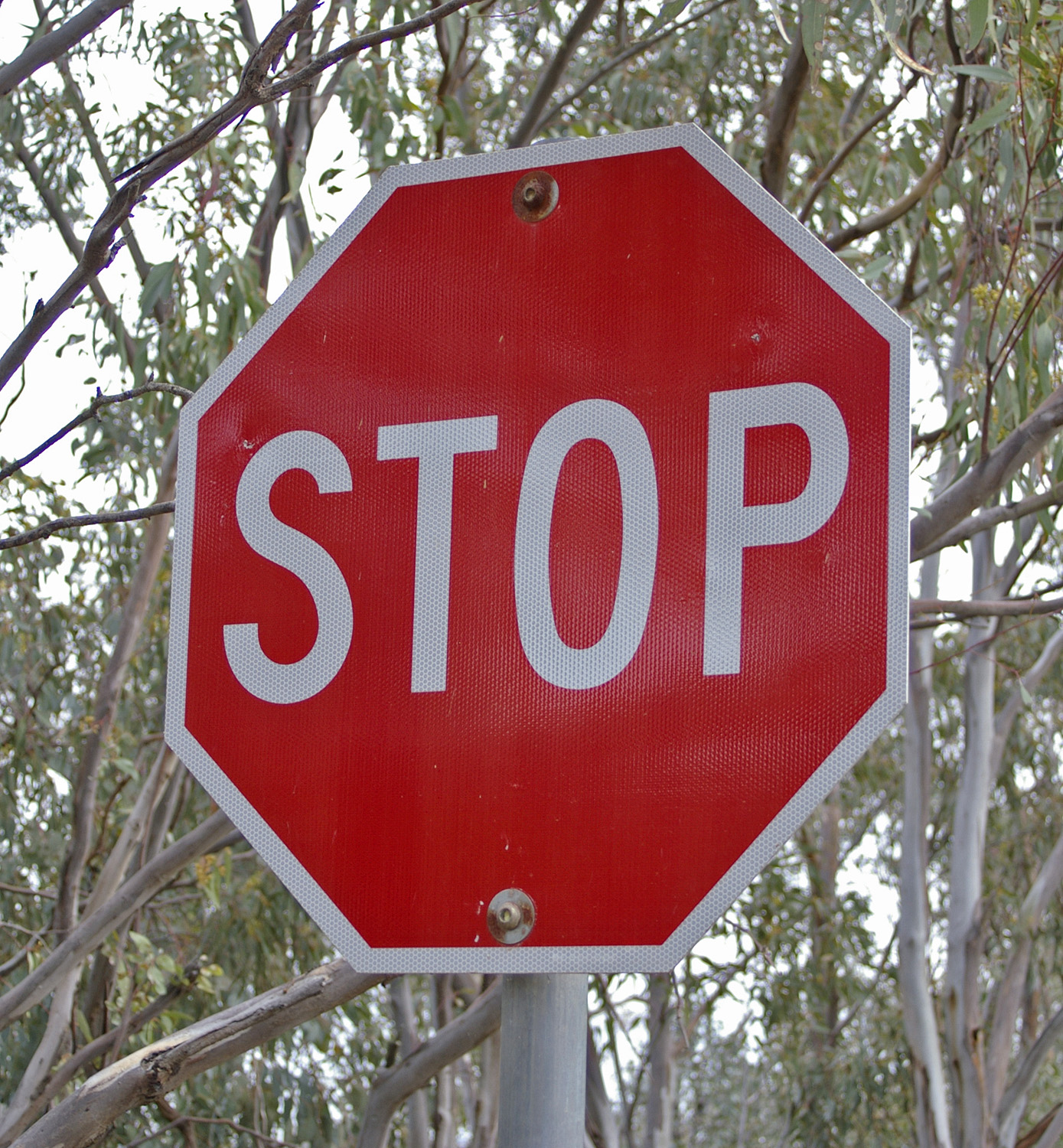
Stop sign in Australia

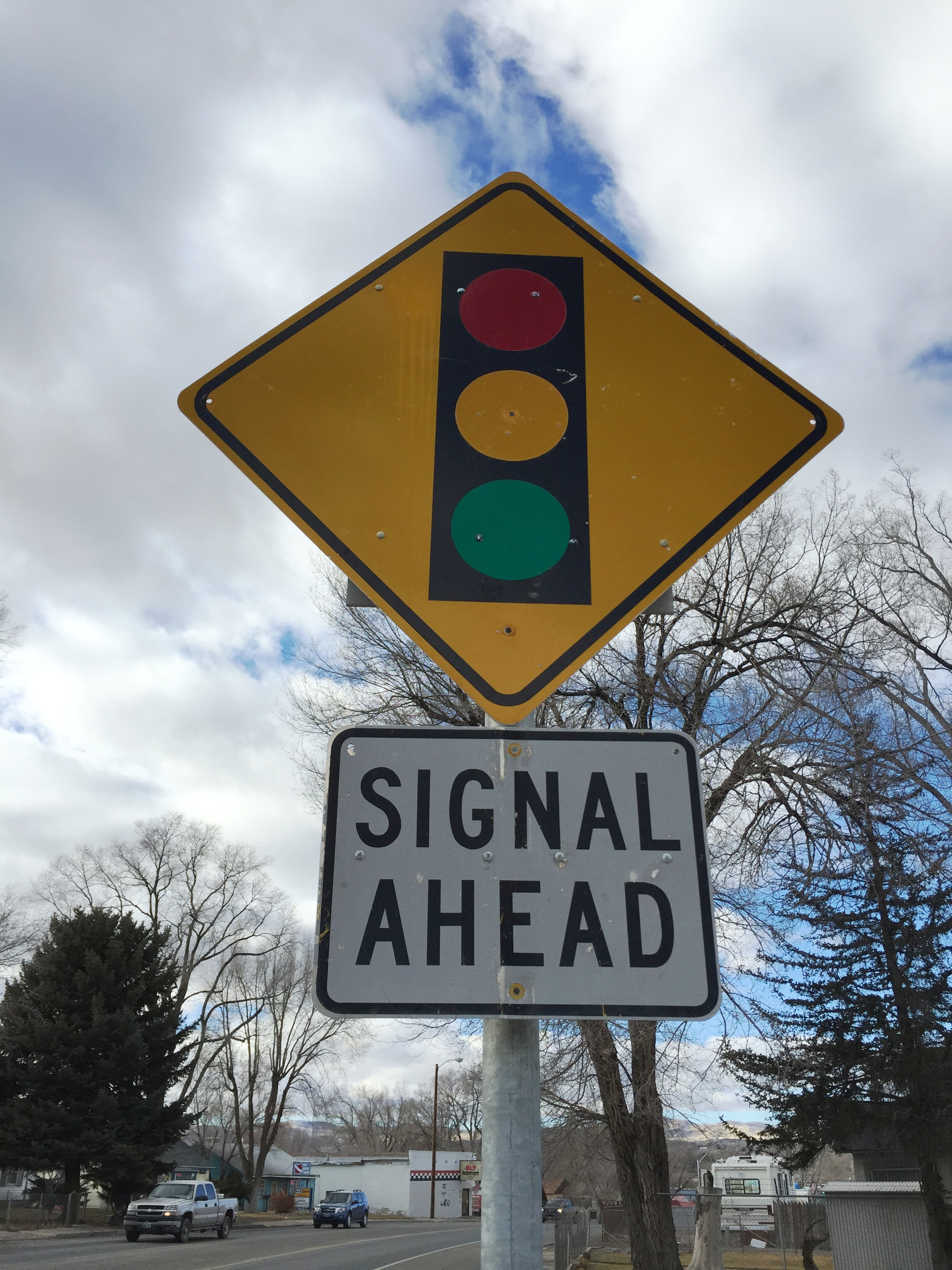
Traffic signal ahead sign in the United States

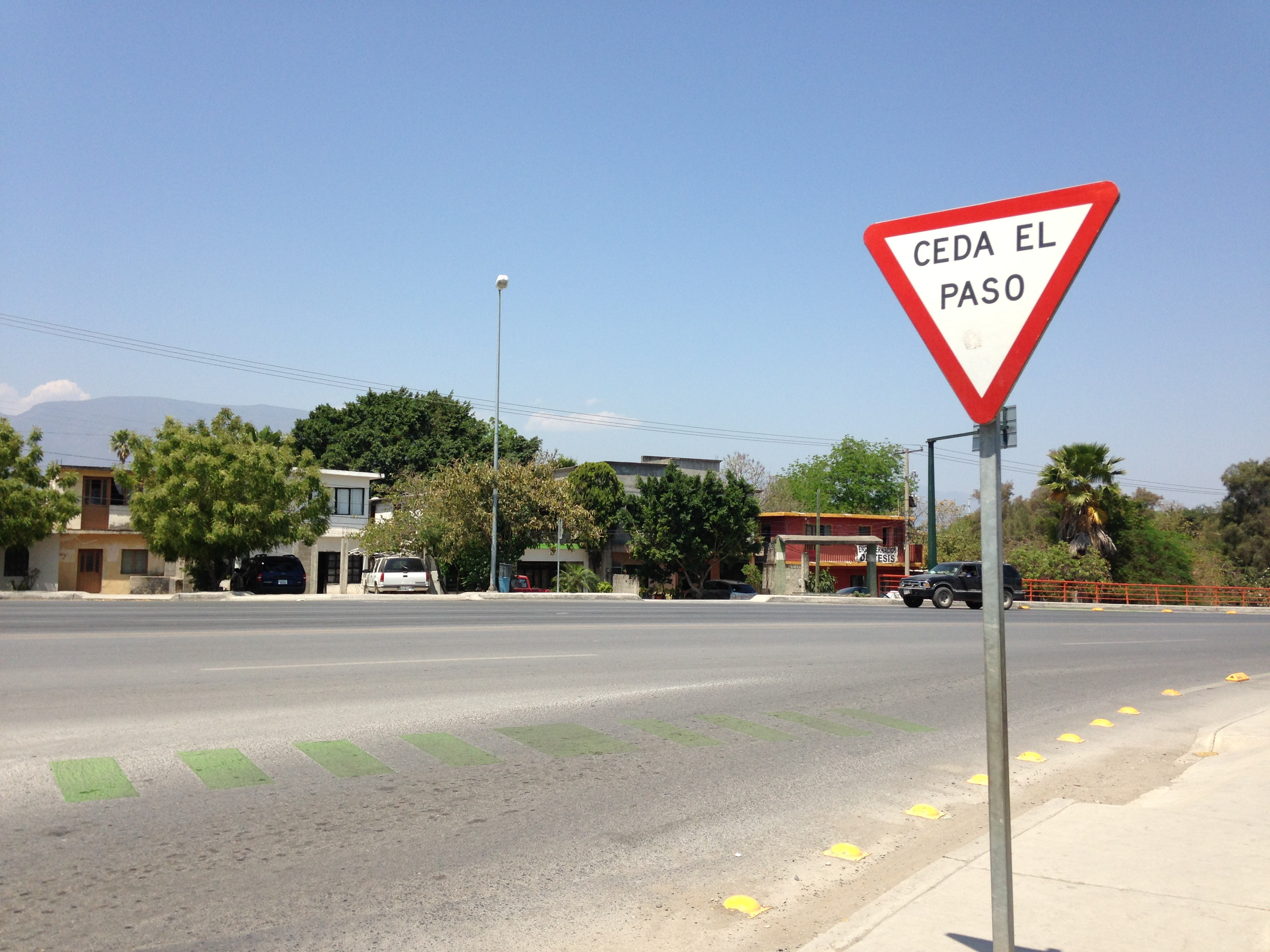
A yield sign in Mexico

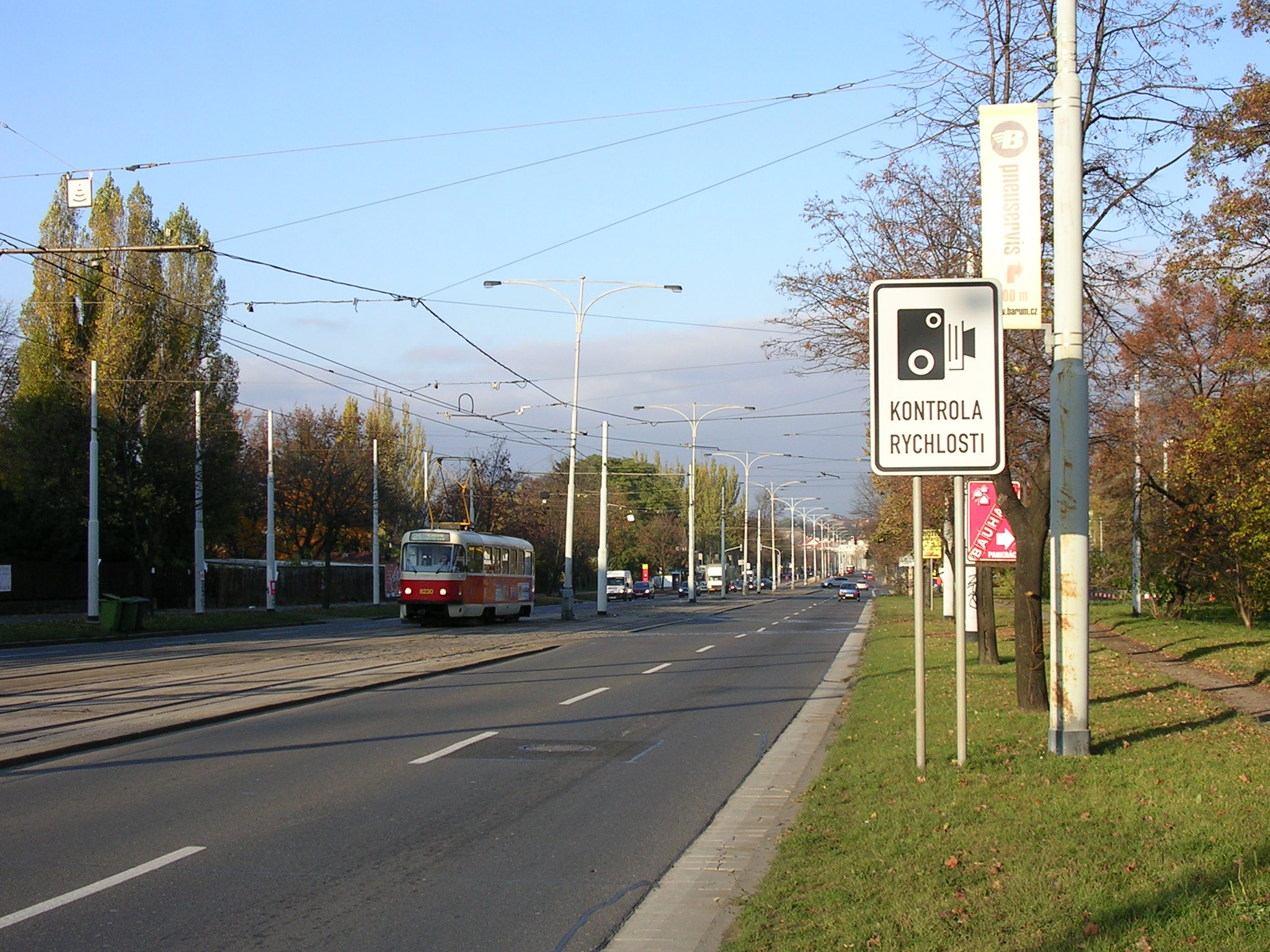
A sign indicating speed limit enforcement ahead in the Czech Republic

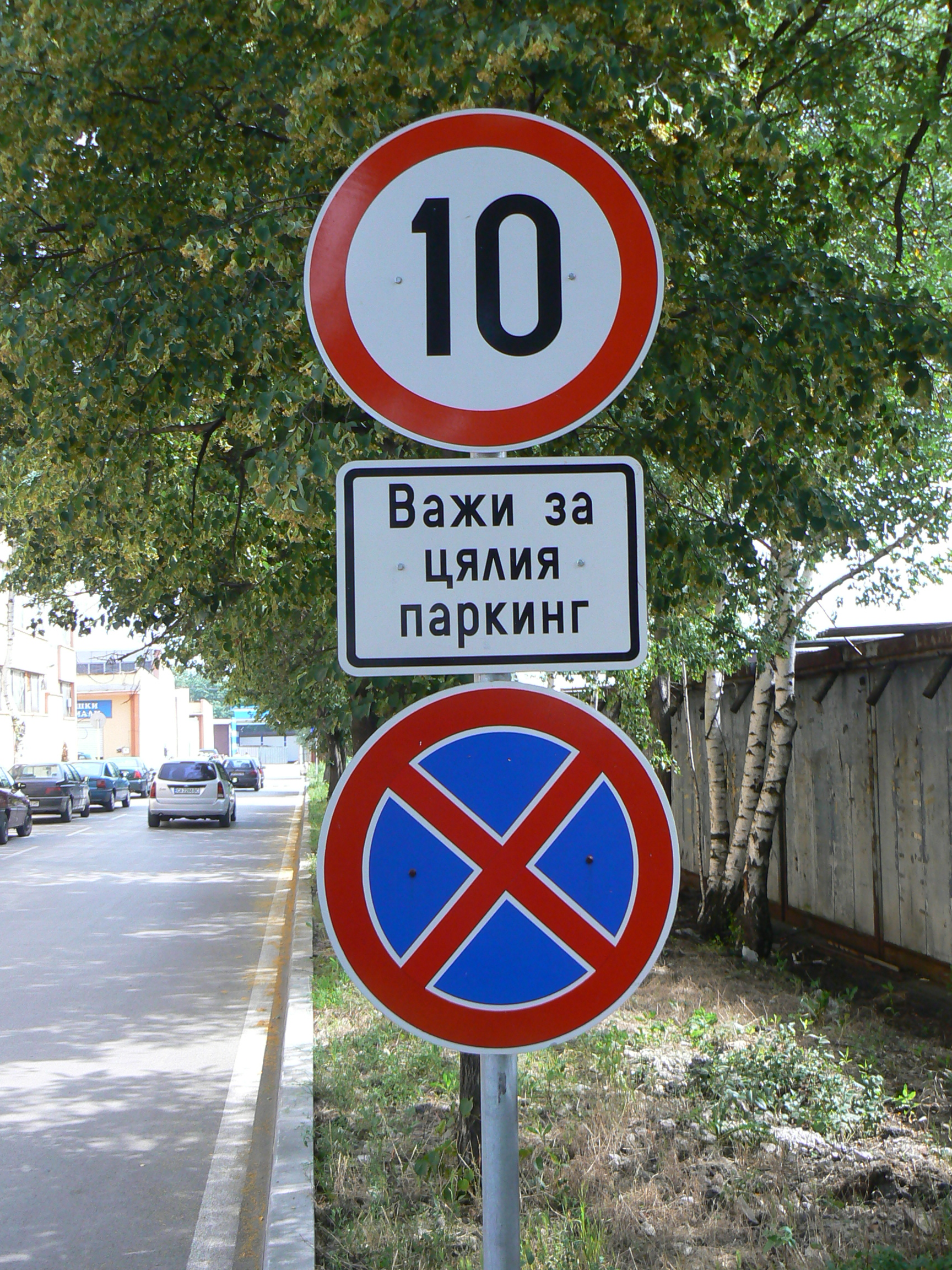
Grammar mistake on a road sign in Sofia, Bulgaria. The third word should be spelled 'целия'.

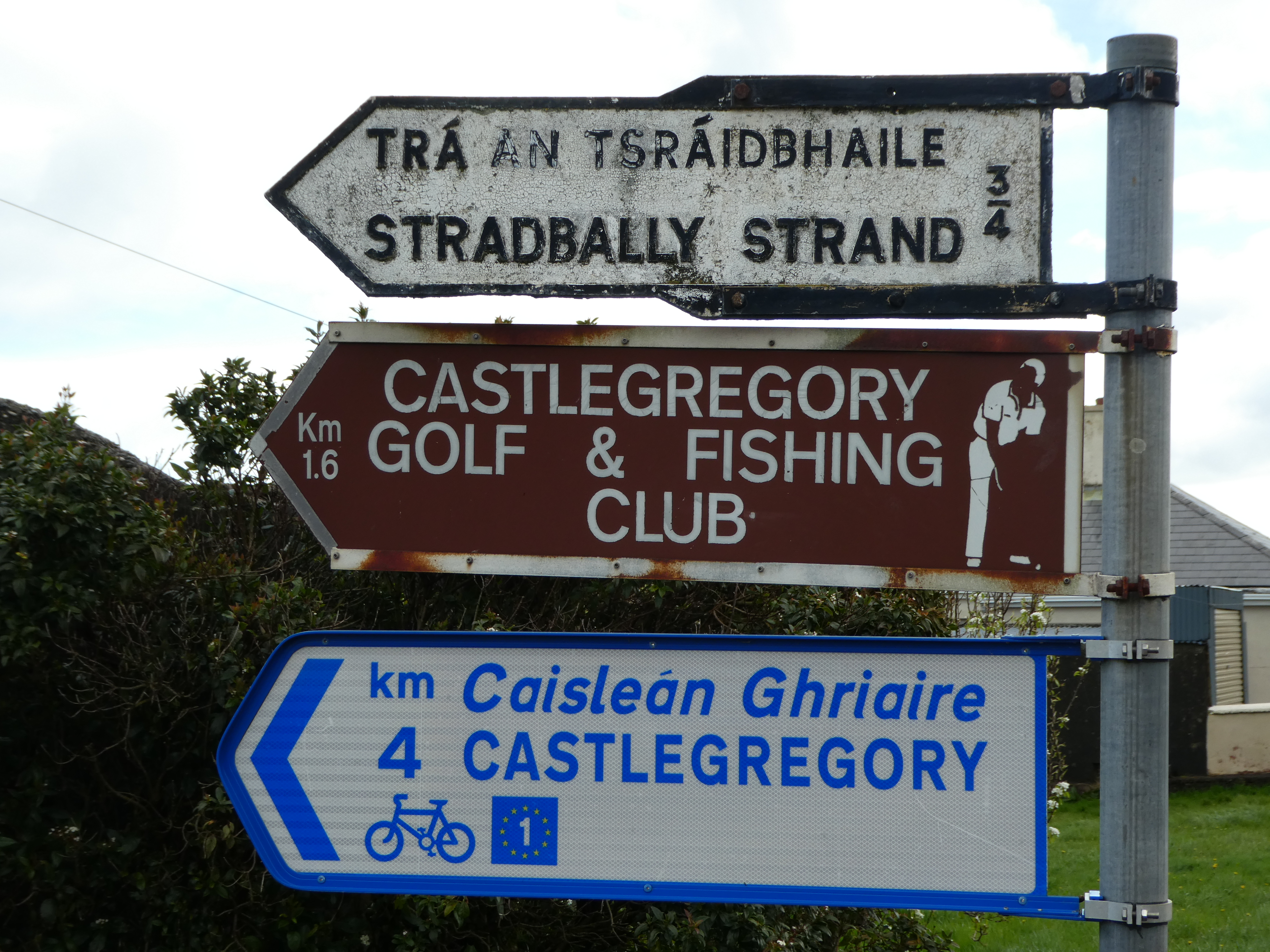
Three bilingual Irish-English directional fingerposts

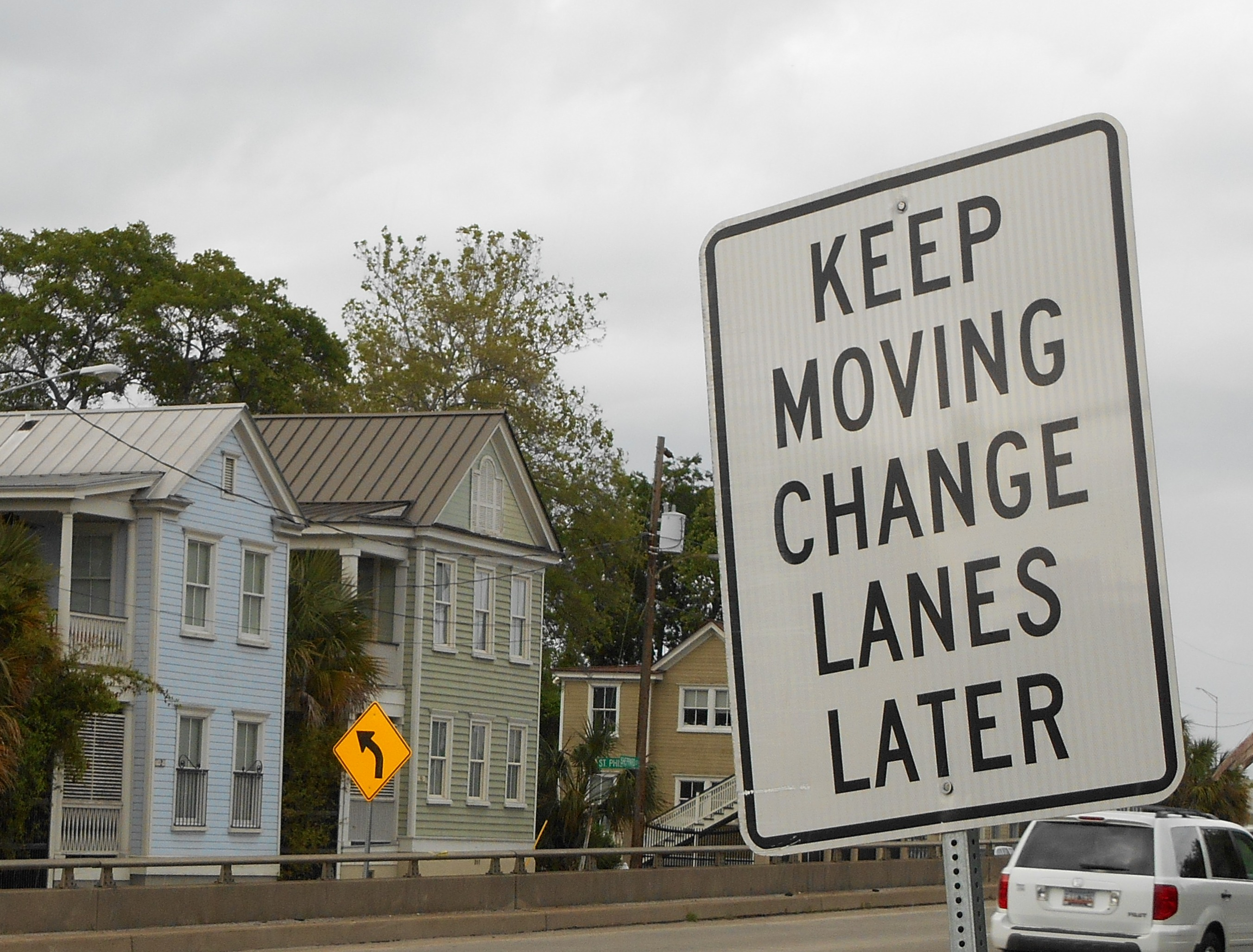
Traffic signs on U.S. Route 17 in Charleston, South Carolina

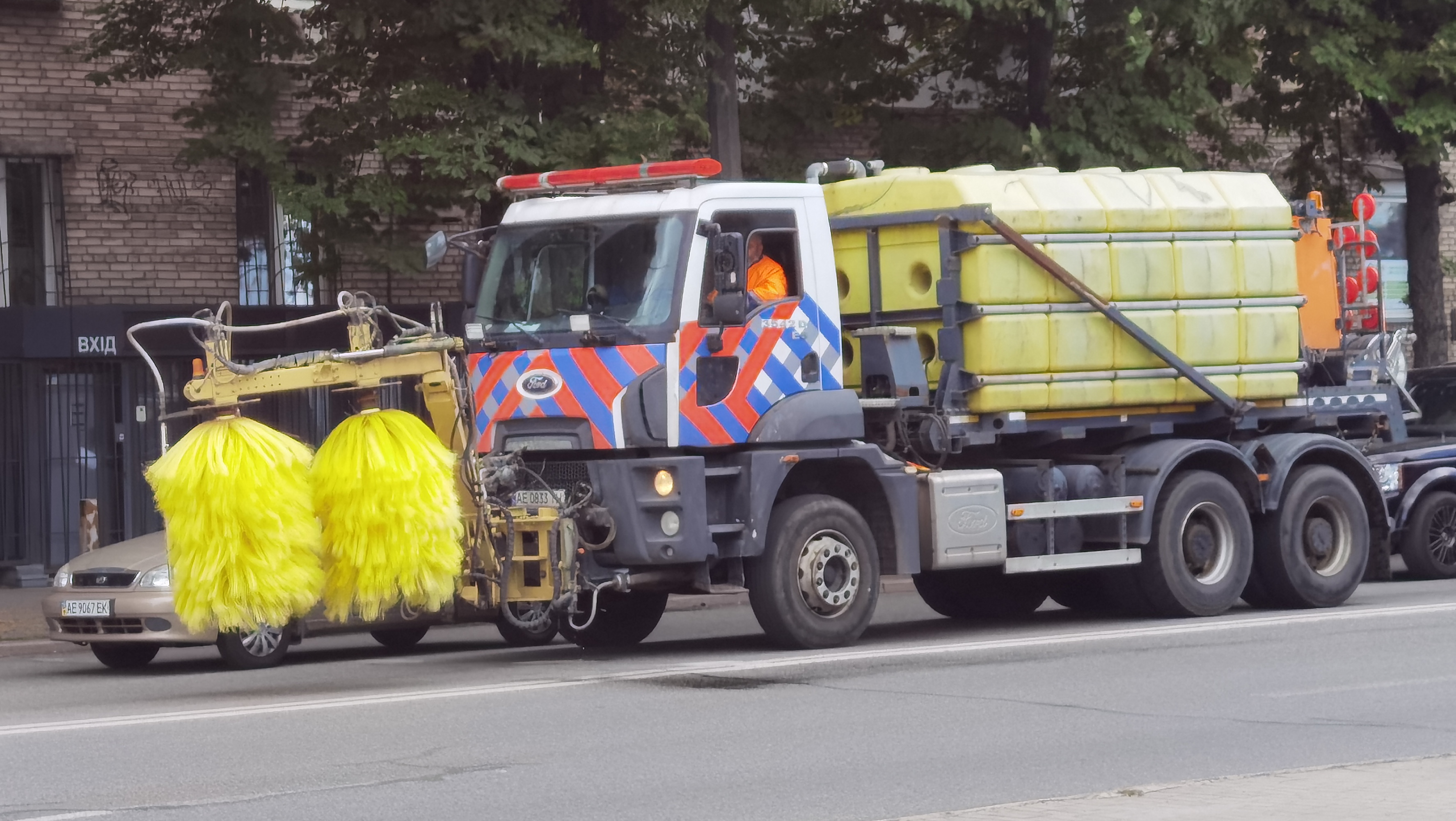
Traffic signs cleaning machine in Dnipro, Ukraine

Speed camera sign used in many countries

== Rail traffic ==
Rail traffic has often a lot of differences between countries and often not much similarity with road signs. Rail traffic has professional drivers who have much longer education than what's normal for road driving licenses. Differences between neighboring countries cause problems for cross border traffic and causes need for additional education for drivers.

== See also ==
- Button copy
- Exit number
- Fingerpost
- Gantry (transport)
- Glossary of road transport terms
- List of public signage typefaces
- Road surface marking
- Rules of the road
- Self-explaining road
- Street sign theft
- Tourist sign
- Traffic light
- Traffic signs by country
- Traffic sign design
- Variable-message sign
- Warning sign
