= Importance (disambiguation) =

Importance is a property of things that matter or make a difference. Importance or Important may also refer to:

- Social status, the measurement of importance within society
- Value (ethics), degree of importance of some thing or action

== Other meanings ==
- Important Records, an American independent record label

== See also ==
- Priority (disambiguation)
