= Special regulation sign =

Type of road sign

German pedestrian crossing special regulation sign

Special regulation signs are road signs that are used to indicate a regulation or danger warning applying to one or more traffic lanes, indicate to lanes reserved for buses, indicate the beginning or end of a built-up area or signs having zonal validity.

Special regulation signs are usually square or rectangle with a blue ground and a light coloured symbol or inscription or with a light coloured ground and a dark coloured symbol or inscription.

== Gallery of road signs ==
German "one way" sign

"One way" sign (Slovakia)

Begin pedestrian zone (Germany)

End pedestrian zone (Germany)

Right turn on red permitted (Chile)

Parking (Poland)

British "Home Zone" sign (Residential zone) starts

British "Home Zone" sign (Residential zone) ends

Cycle zone (Russia)

End of the cycle zone (Russia)

Start of a state highway (Lithuania)

End of a state highway (Lithuania)

Start of a county highway (Russia)

End of a county highway (Russia)

Start of a shared zone (New Zealand)

Dead end street ahead (SADC)

Common U.S. one way sign (leftward)

Common U.S. one way sign (rightward)

Start of a bus lane (Mongolia)

Start of a bus lane (Russia)

Start of a cycle lane (Russia)

Zebra crossing (Ireland)

Dead end street ahead (Russia)

Taxi stop (Moldova)

Bus stop (Moldova)

Tram stop (Moldova)

Speed bump (Croatia)

Speed hump (Russia)

Speed hump (Moldova)

50 km/h advisory speed limit (Moldova)

Residential area (Canada)

Airport (Ontario)

Cycle crossing (Poland)

Start of motorway (Poland)

Tunnel (Poland)

End of maximum speed limit (North Macedonia)
