= Priority signs =

Signs indicating vehicle passage order

Priority traffic signs indicate the order in which vehicles shall pass intersection points. Vehicles often come into conflict with other vehicles and pedestrians because their intended courses of travel intersect, and thus interfere with each other's routes. The general principle that establishes who has the right to pass first is called "right of way" or "priority". It establishes who has the right to use the conflicting part of the road and who has to wait until the other does so. The vehicle that does not need to wait is said to "have the right of way" or to "have priority."

== Types of sign ==
A give way sign in Hong Kong in both English and Traditional Chinese

A common priority over oncoming traffic sign which has priority over vehicles from the opposite direction (rectangular shape)

A common priority road sign before the oncoming traffic which gives way (circular shape)

A common priority road sign before the oncoming traffic which gives way (rectangular shape)

A give way sign, also known as a yield sign in some countries, informs the driver that they must give way to vehicles on the major road. Under the Vienna Convention on Road Signs and Signals, the standard sign shall be a white or yellow inverted triangle with a red border. This originates in Denmark, with the red and white coming from the Danish flag. In some countries, the words give way or equivalent may be included with the sign. These signs are usually accompanied by a give way marking, normally one or multiple dashed lines or shark teeth across the carriageway.

Priority signs according to the Vienna Convention on Road Signs and Signals
Give way	Inverted equilateral triangle	White or yellow	Red	0.9 m (large), 0.6 m (small)	None
Stop	Octagon	Red	White	0.9 m (large), 0.6 m (small)	"STOP" written in white
Stop	Circular	White or yellow	Red	0.9 m (large), 0.6 m (small)	"STOP" written in black or dark blue inside red inverted triangle
Priority road	Diamond	White	Black	0.5 m (large), 0.35 m (small)	Yellow or orange square
End of priority road	Diamond	White	Black	0.5 m (large), 0.35 m (small)	Yellow or orange square with black or grey diagonal lines crossing the sign
Priority for oncoming traffic	Circular	White or yellow	Red	Unspecified	Black arrow indicating direction with priority, red arrow indicating direction without
Priority over oncoming traffic	Rectangle	Blue	None	Unspecified	White arrow indicating direction with priority, red arrow indicating direction without

== Alternative priority systems ==
Sign indicating the route of priority road (thick line) of a shape of the intersection and defining the priority

Dangerous intersection with priority indication (for the next intersection only). Different variants of the sign can be used on both priority- and non-priority roads. Each sign has the thicker line indicating the road or direction that has priority with the viewer's own direction being from the bottom of the sign.

Swiss mountain postal road sign: priority given to public transport, such as postal bus (pay special attention to the specific three-tone-horn of the postal bus approaching hairpin bends and wait before the bend; traffic users must follow instructions given by public transport drivers)

Swiss end of mountain postal road

A filter in turn in the Channel Islands, which indicates that traffic from different approaches has alternating priority at the junction.

Yield at roundabout sign, left-hand traffic version

Yield at roundabout sign, right-hand traffic version

Turn left, yield on green arrow

Turn right on red arrow

Yield to trams

Stop for all directions, then they yield to left

Stop for all directions, then they yield to right

Side road on the left with priority (diamond)

Side road on the right with priority (diamond)

Side road on the left (diamond)

Side road on the right (diamond)

Side road on the left with priority with a thick line (diamond)

Side road on the right with priority with a thick line (diamond)

Crossroads under general priority (diamond)

Crossroads with priority (diamond)

Crossroads with priority with a thick line (diamond)

Crossroads with a major road

T-intersection with a major road

T-intersection sign

Crossroad priority sign on the left

Crossroad priority sign on the right

Y-intersection sign

Y-junction on the left

Y-junction on the right

Crossroads with priority (triangle)

Side road on the left with priority (triangle)

Side road on the right with priority (triangle)

Bikes yield to pedestrians

Yield to pedestrians

Yield to pedestrians

== See also ==
- Traffic sign
- Priority to the right
