= Preemption =

Preemption or pre-emption may refer to:

== Legal ==
- FDA preemption, legal theory in the United States that exempts product manufacturers from tort claims regarding Food and Drug Administration approved products
- Federal preemption, displacement of U.S. state law by U.S. Federal law
- Pre-emption rights, the right of existing shareholders in a company to buy shares offered for sale before they are offered to the public
- Preemption (land), a type of land transfer in the United States, as in the Preemption Act of 1841
- Preemption Line, the line dividing Indian lands awarded to New York, from those awarded to the Commonwealth of Massachusetts in 1786
- State preemption, displacement of U.S. municipal law by state law

== Other ==
- Preempt, a type of bid and a bidding tactic in contract bridge
- Preemption (computing), the interruption of a computer process without its cooperation in order to perform another task
- Preemption, Illinois, a CDP in the township
- Preemption Township, Mercer County, Illinois
- Preemptive war or preemptive strike
- Traffic signal preemption
- Preemption (media), also known as a blackout in broadcasting
