= Traffic signs by country =

Traffic signs are generally based on the Vienna Convention on Road Signs and Signals or on the United States Manual on Uniform Traffic Control Devices. This article is a summary of traffic signs used in each country.

== Africa ==
Generally, road signs in African countries closely follow those used in Europe, but most African countries have not ratified the Vienna Convention on Road Signs and Signals.

Although the Trans-African Highway network exists, Trans-African route numbers are not signed at all in any African country, except Kenya and Uganda where the Mombasa–Nairobi–Kampala–Fort Portal section (or the Kampala–Kigali feeder road) of Trans-African Highway 8 is sometimes referred to as the "Trans-Africa Highway".

A number of member states of the Southern African Development Community – Botswana, Eswatini, Lesotho, Malawi, Mozambique, Namibia, South Africa, Tanzania, Zambia and Zimbabwe, as well as non-member state Rwanda – use road signs which are based on the SADC Road Traffic Signs Manual, a document designed to harmonise traffic signs in these countries. However, not all member states have adopted the SADC-RTSM, and those that have may not use all signs listed in the SADC-RTSM or may use regional variations.

Member states of the Economic and Monetary Community of Central Africa – Cameroon, the Central African Republic, Chad, Equatorial Guinea, the Republic of the Congo and Gabon – use a signage system based heavily on that of France.

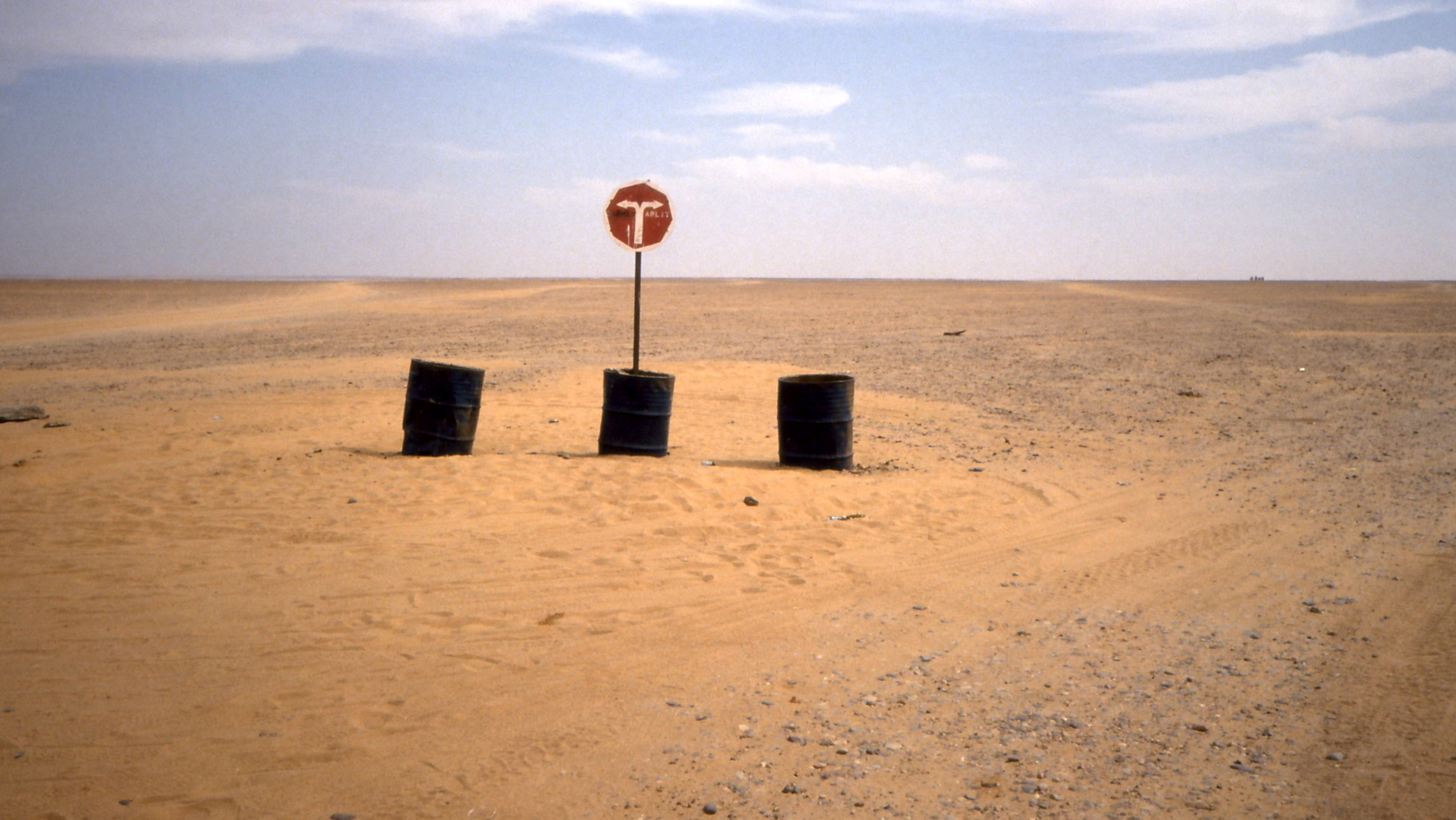
"T" junction road sign on a desert track in Niger.

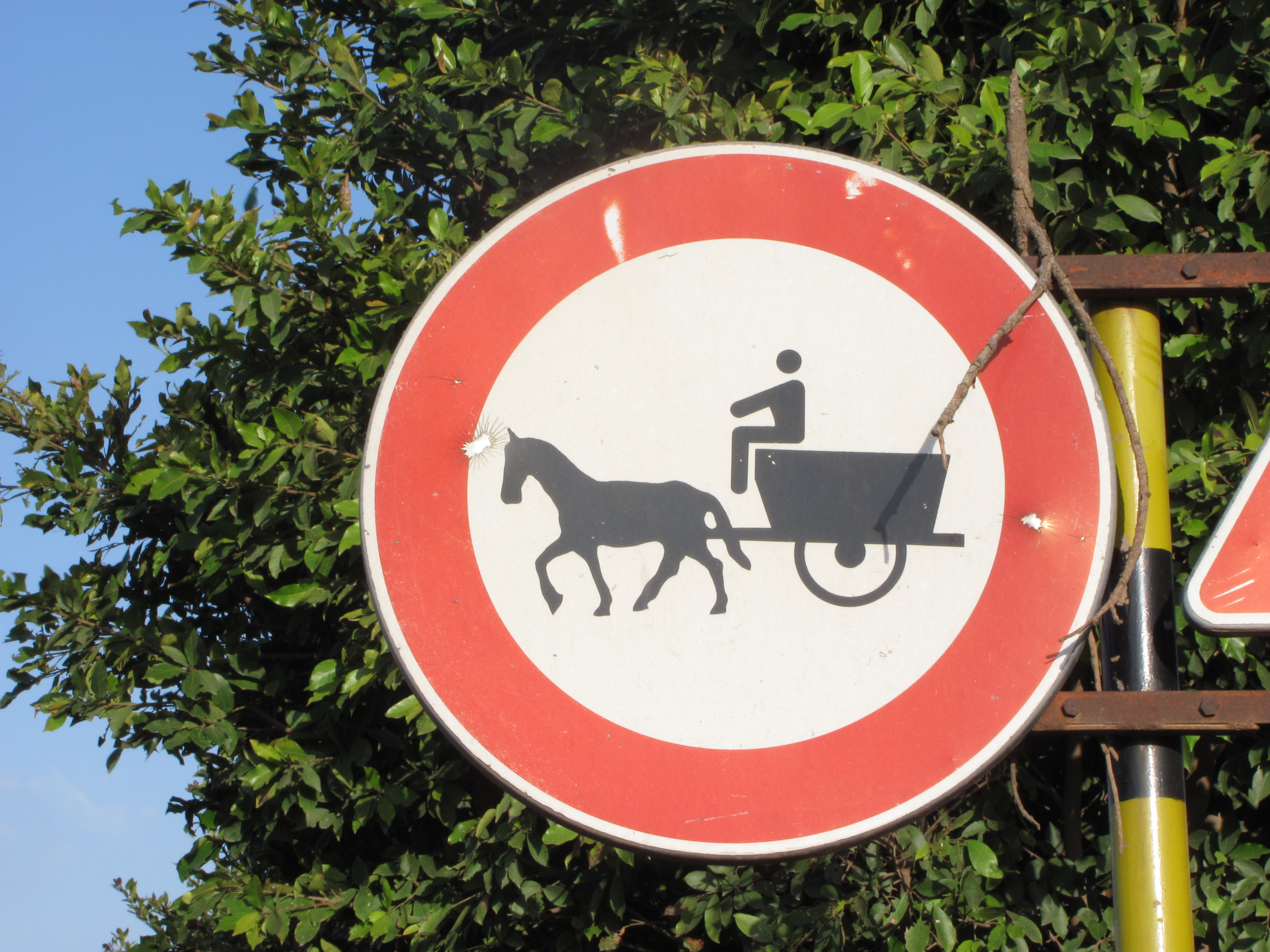
Road sign in Asmara, Eritrea.

=== Angola ===
Road signs in Angola are particularly modelled on the Portuguese road signs since Angola is a former Portuguese colony. Since the country is a member of the Southern African Development Community, road signs are going to be harmonised with the traffic signs in member states of the Community according to the SADC Road Traffic Signs Manual despite they are transitional in nature.

=== Burundi ===
Road signs in Burundi are similar in appearance to those used in Italy with certain distinctions. They are written in French in uppercase letters.

=== Djibouti ===
Road signs in Djibouti are similar in appearance to those used in Spain with certain distinctions. They are written in French in uppercase letters.

=== Egypt ===
Road signs in Egypt are regulated under the Egypt Traffic Signs Manual (ETSM). They closely follow those used in the United Kingdom with certain distinctions. They are written in Arabic and English.

=== Ethiopia ===
Road signs in Ethiopia are regulated under the Traffic Signs Manual of Ethiopia (TSME). They closely follow those used in the United Kingdom with certain distinctions. They are written in Amharic and English.

=== Mauritius ===
Road signs in Mauritius are regulated by the Traffic Signs Regulations 1990. They are largely derived from the British road sign system since Mauritius is a former British colony.

=== Nigeria ===
Road signs in Nigeria do not differ greatly from those used in the rest of the African continent. However, it notably makes use of a yellow background for warning and prohibitory signs, as well as yellow text for the stop sign.

=== Sierra Leone ===
Road signs in Sierra Leone are similar in appearance to those used in Italy with certain distinctions. They are written in English in uppercase letters.

=== Somalia ===
Road signs in Somalia are similar in appearance to those used in Italy with certain distinctions. They are written in Arabic and Somali.

=== Uganda ===
Road signs in Uganda are largely derived from the British road sign system since the country is a former British colony.

== Asia ==
Road signs in Asia differ by country. Typically, Asian countries closely follow Europe in terms of road sign design, which means they are influenced by the Vienna Convention on Road Signs and Signals, though a number of countries' signage has been influenced from the Manual on Uniform Traffic Control Devices (MUTCD), for example Cambodia, Japan, Thailand, Myanmar, Sri Lanka, Malaysia and Indonesia.

Asian Highway Network signs are marked using white letters on a dark blue background. In Turkey and Russia, European route numbers are indicated using white characters on a green rectangle and are signposted; however this is not the case in many other Asian countries.

=== Armenia ===
Road signs in Armenia are similar in design to those used in the Soviet Union before its collapse in 1991 as the country was a Soviet Socialist Republic until 1991. Modern road signs used in Armenia generally maintain the same design as those used in Russia, with the exception that inscriptions on road signs are written in both Armenian and English, including the stop sign.

=== Azerbaijan ===
Road signs in Azerbaijan are similar in design to those used in the Soviet Union before its collapse in 1991 as the country was a Soviet Socialist Republic until 1991.

=== Cambodia ===
In Cambodia, road signs are prescribed by the Ministry of Public Works and Transport. Cambodian road signage practice closely follows those used in Europe — with the exception of warning signs which follow the American MUTCD — matching these designs used in other Asian countries like Japan, Myanmar, Thailand, Malaysia and Indonesia.

=== China ===
A variety of road signs are used in mainland China, specified in the Guobiao standard GB 5678–2009. Most road signs in China, like warning signs, appear to adopt the practices of the ISO standards not intended for use in traffic signage, which are ISO 3864 and ISO 7010.

- Warning signs in China are triangular with a black border, yellow background and black symbol.
- Mandatory signs generally follow European conventions (circular with red border/blue circle) with some local variations.

Direction signs have these colours:

- Green for expressways
- Brown for tourist attractions
- Blue for other roads
- Occasionally, black on white is used for directions to local facilities.

==== Hong Kong ====
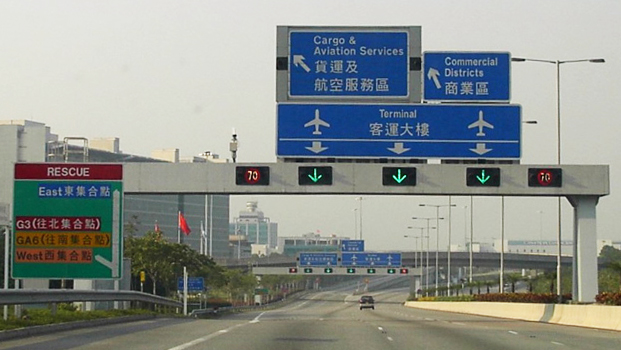
Road signs in Hong Kong

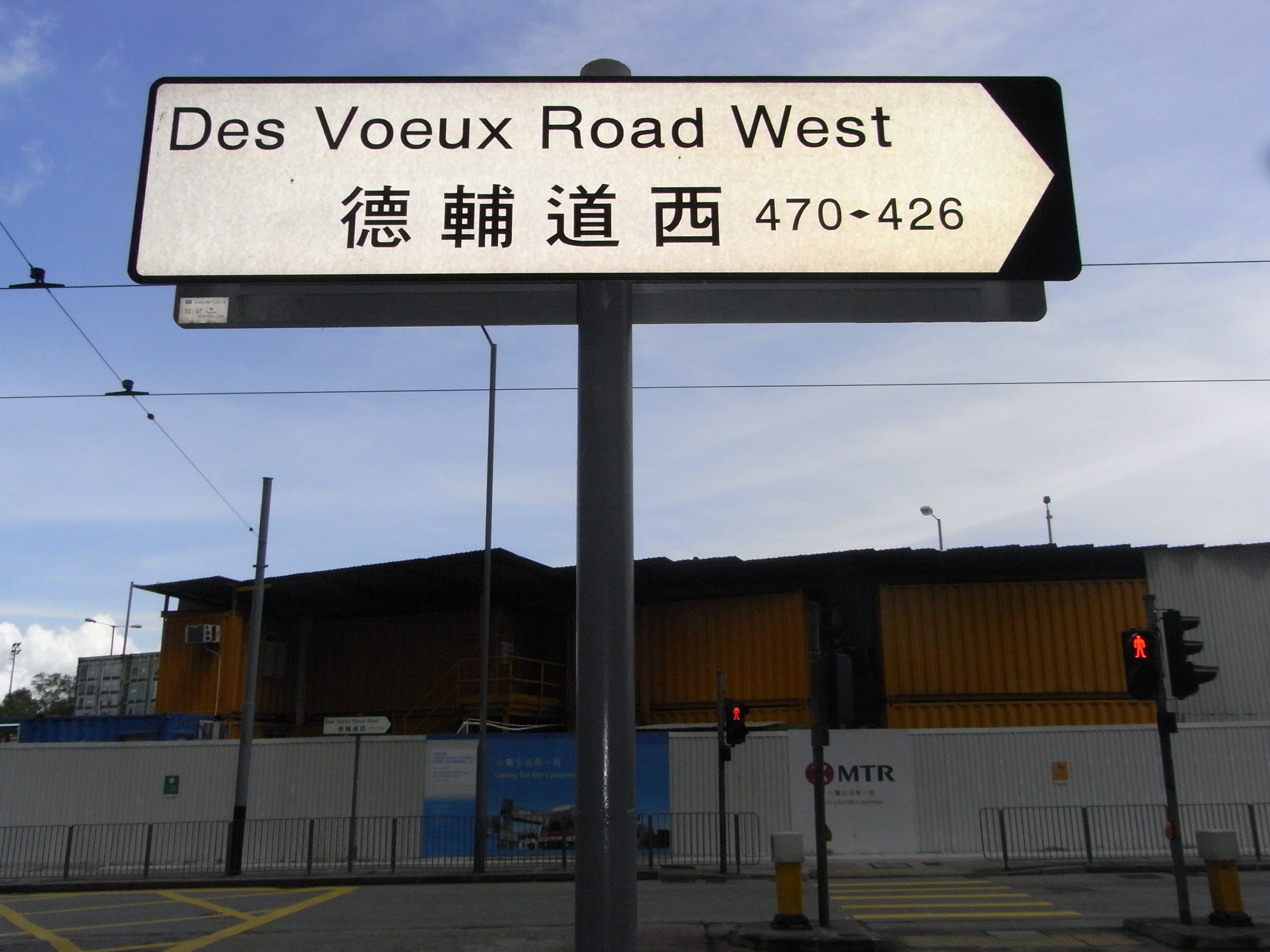
A street sign in Central, Hong Kong

Hong Kong's traffic signs are derived from the British road sign system, and are bilingual in English and Chinese (English on top, and traditional Chinese characters at the bottom).

==== Macau ====
Road signs in Macau are inherited from Portuguese road signage system prior to 1994/1998. Inscriptions are written in Chinese (traditional Chinese characters) and Portuguese.

==== Taiwan ====
Road signs in Taiwan are reminiscent of the early 1940s Japanese road signage, which was used in Japan itself until 1950. Overall, Taiwan is lenient towards European road signs in terms of design, but with some influences from road signs used in Japan and China, as well as the MUTCD for guide signs and temporary signs (amber rhombic warning signs).

=== Georgia ===
Road signs in Georgia are mostly inherited from those used in the former Soviet Union, but with some modifications in design. Inscriptions on road signs are usually written in Georgian and English.

=== India ===
Road signs in the Republic of India are similar to those used in some parts of the United Kingdom, except that they are multilingual. Most urban roads and state highways have signs in the state language and English. National highways have signs in the state language and English.

=== Indonesia ===
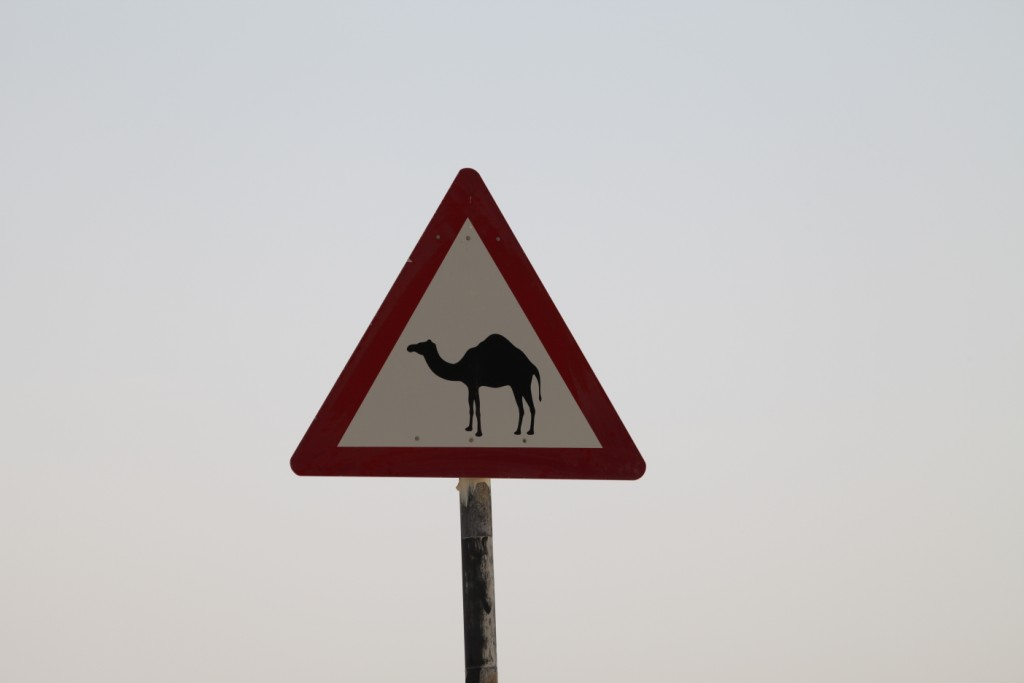
Warning signs for a camel are common in the Arabian Peninsula region.

=== Iran ===
Road signs in Iran mainly follow the Vienna Convention. Text is written in Persian and English.

=== Iraq ===
Road signs in Iraq are regulated in Chapter 11 of the Highway Geometric Design Code. They are written in Arabic and English.

=== Israel ===
Road signs in Israel mainly follow the Vienna Convention, but have some variants. Many signs are trilingual, with text written in Hebrew, Arabic and English.

=== Japan ===
Japanese stop sign with the word Tomare (止まれ), meaning Stop

Road signs in Japan are either controlled by local police authorities under Road Traffic Law (道路交通法, Dōro Kōtsūhō) or by other road-controlling entities including Ministry of Land, Infrastructure, Transport and Tourism, local municipalities, NEXCO (companies controlling expressways), under Road Law (道路法, Dōrohō). Most of the design of the road signs in Japan are similar to the signs on the Vienna Convention, except for some significant variances, such as stop sign with a red downward triangle.

=== Kazakhstan ===
The design of road signs in Kazakhstan is largely based on that of the former Soviet Union. Inscriptions on road signs, including the names of settlements and streets, are usually written in two languages: Kazakh and Russian.

=== Korea ===
A typical South Korean road sign for a double curve

Both North Korea and South Korea developed their own road signage systems.

Road signs in South Korea are standardised and regulated by the Korean Road Traffic Authority. South Korean road signage closely follows those used in Europe, but with some influences from road signs in Japan. Similar to road signs of Poland and Greece, road signs are triangular, have a yellow background and a red border. Like other countries, the signs use pictograms to display their meaning.

Road signs in North Korea differ by locale. Most of the time, they tend to closely follow China in design (but identically), and some road signs are unique to North Korea (such as an exclamation mark drawn on another sign to indicate other dangers), so they never appear elsewhere. The font used for Latin letters appear to be the same as in China.

South Korea keeps close to the Vienna Convention on Road Signs and Signals as South Korea is an original signatory. On the other hand, North Korea is not a signatory to the convention and instead designs its own signs, creating confusion.

=== Kyrgyzstan ===
The design of road signs in Kyrgyzstan is largely based on that of the former Soviet Union.

=== Mongolia ===
The design of road signs in Mongolia is largely based on that of the former Soviet Union, despite having never been part of it. Inscriptions on road signs are usually written in Mongolian and English.

=== Oman ===
According to the 2017 Highway Design Standards, road signs in Oman follow the standards set out in the Gulf Cooperation Council's Manual on Uniform Traffic Control Devices.

=== Philippines ===
Philippines winding road ahead sign

Route marker sign for Asian Highway 26, as seen on EDSA and the Maharlika Highway.

Road signs in the Philippines are standardized in the Road Signs and Pavement Markings Manual, published by the Department of Public Works and Highways. Philippine road signage practice closely follow those used in Europe, but with local adaptations and some minor influences from the US MUTCD and Australian road signs. However, some road signs may differ by locale, and mostly diverge from the national standard. For example, the Metropolitan Manila Development Authority (MMDA) has used pink and light blue in its signage for which it has been heavily criticised.

Regulatory road signs are generally circular, and most warning signs take the form of a triangle. Since 2012, however, a more visibly distinctive design (taken from that used for school signs in the US) has been adopted for pedestrian-related signs: these consist of a fluorescent yellow-green pentagon with black border and symbol.

The Philippines signed the Vienna Convention on Road Signs and Signals on 8 November 1968, and ratified it on 27 December 1973.

=== Qatar ===
Road signs in Qatar are regulated under the Qatar Traffic Control Manual (QTCM). They closely follow those used in the United Kingdom with certain distinctions. They are written in Arabic and English.

=== Russia ===
Road signs in the Asian part of Russia follow the Vienna Convention, specified in the GOST standard 52290-2004 (the Soviet Union was an original signatory to the convention, but only a few post-Soviet states are signatories to the convention). However, direction signs in the Asian part of Russia omit European route numbers (which are used in the European part), replaced by Asian route numbers, which are dark blue in background with white lettering, with a few exceptions. The same also applies to road signs used in Central Asian countries such as Kazakhstan, Kyrgyzstan, Tajikistan, Turkmenistan and Uzbekistan.

Russia signed the Vienna Convention on Road Signs and Signals on 8 November 1968 and ratified it on 7 June 1974.

=== Saudi Arabia ===
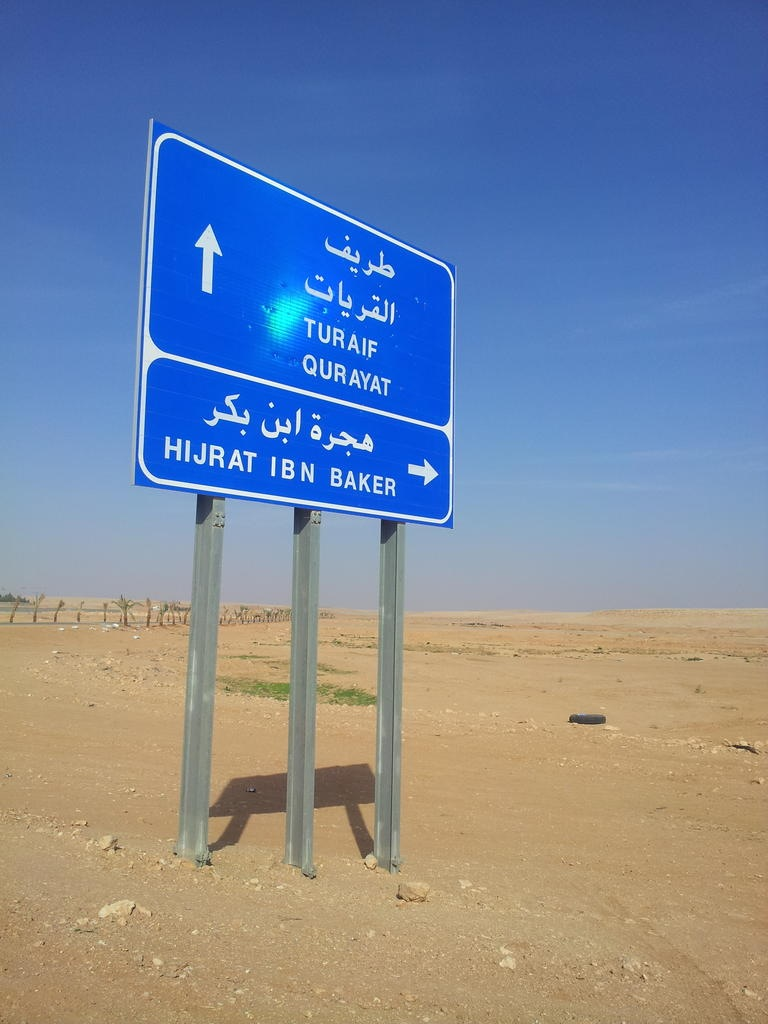
Saudi road sign

Road signs in Saudi Arabia are generally written in Arabic and English. A particular aspect of Saudi signage is that they indicate areas which are forbidden to non-Muslims in the cities of Mecca and Medina.

=== Singapore ===
Singapore's traffic signs closely follow British road sign conventions, although the government has introduced some changes to them.

=== Thailand ===
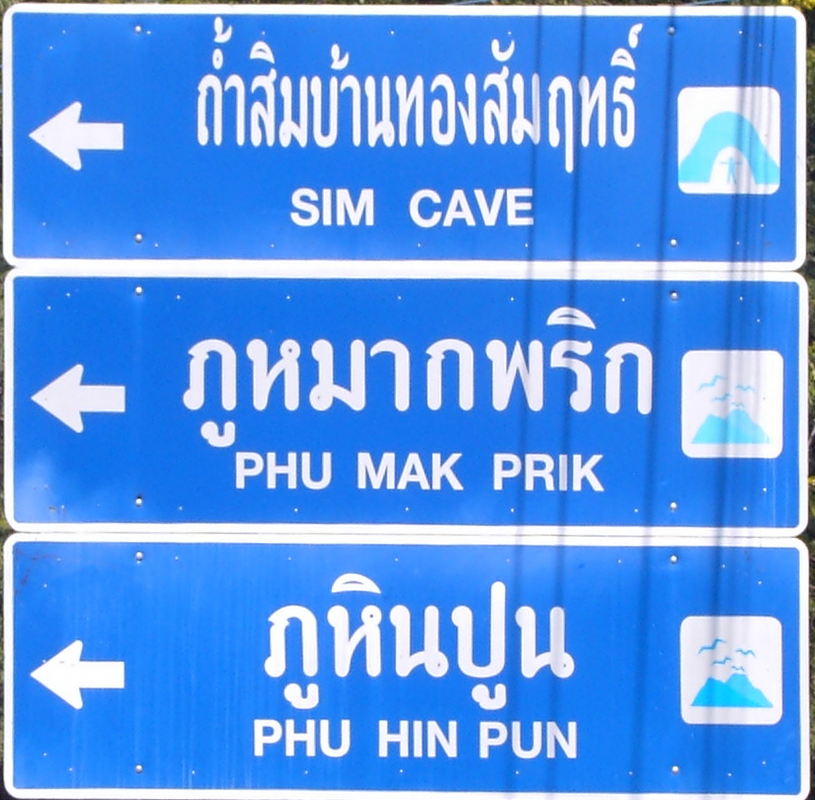
Road signs in Yasothon Province, TH

Road signs in Thailand are standardised and are uniform throughout the country. Since the late twentieth century, Thai road signage practice closely follows the designs used in the United States, Europe and Japan. Road signs are often written in Thai language and display in metric units. In tourist areas, English is also used for important public places such as tourist attractions, airports, railway stations, and immigration checkpoints. Destinations on direction signage is written are written in both Thai and English.

Thailand signed the Vienna Convention on Road Signs and Signals on 8 November 1968 but has yet to fully ratify it.

=== Turkmenistan ===
Road signs in Turkmenistan are mostly based on those used in the Soviet Union before its dissolution in 1991. However, modern road signs in Turkmenistan are similar to those used in Turkey.

=== Uzbekistan ===
Road signs in Uzbekistan are very similar in design to those used in the Soviet Union until its dissolution in 1991, as the country was a Soviet Socialist Republic until 1991, when it declared its independence from the Soviet Union. Modern road signs in Uzbekistan on the one hand follow modern road signs used in Russia from the GOST R 52290-2004 standard, but on the other hand follow road signs from European countries such as Spain, Germany and Italy.

=== Yemen ===
Road signs in Yemen are regulated under the Yemen Highway Design Standards (YHDS). Their designs both influenced by British and German road signage designs with certain distinctions. They are written in Arabic and English.

Previously, the Colony of Aden (Note: Later became South Yemen in 1967 prior to the Yemeni unification in 1990.) used pre-Worboys road signs like many former British colonies.

== Europe ==
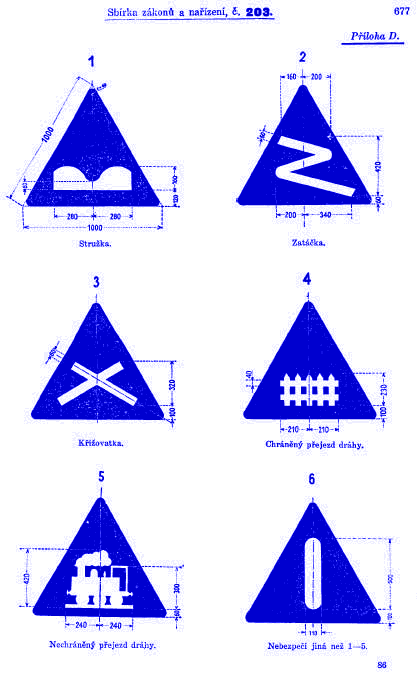
The first road signs established in Czechoslovakia on 1 November 1935: six blue-white danger warning signs. They were later supplanted with red-white-black signs.

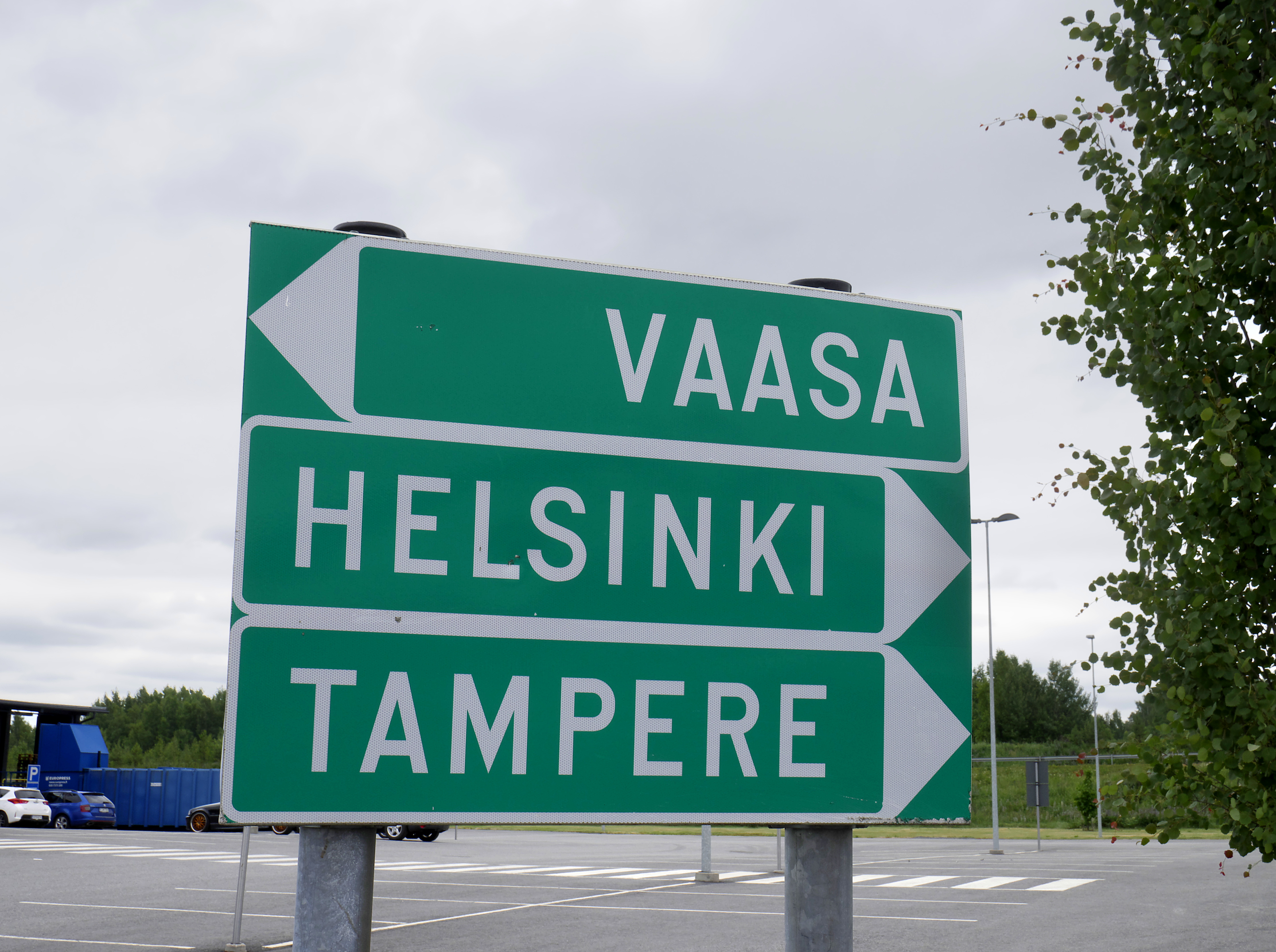
Road signs in Pirkkala, Finland guiding motorists to motorways leading to Vaasa, Helsinki and Tampere.

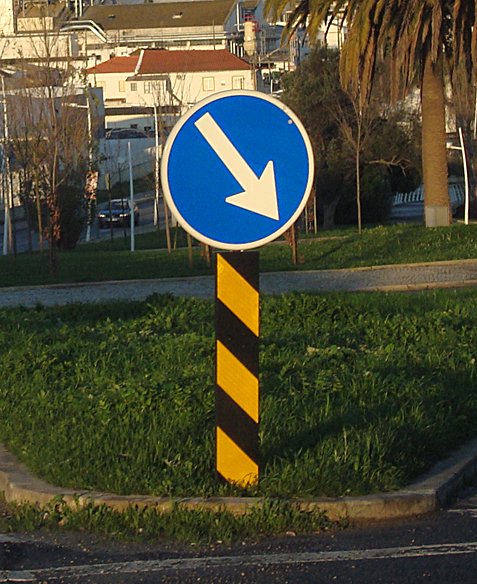
Keep right sign in Portugal.

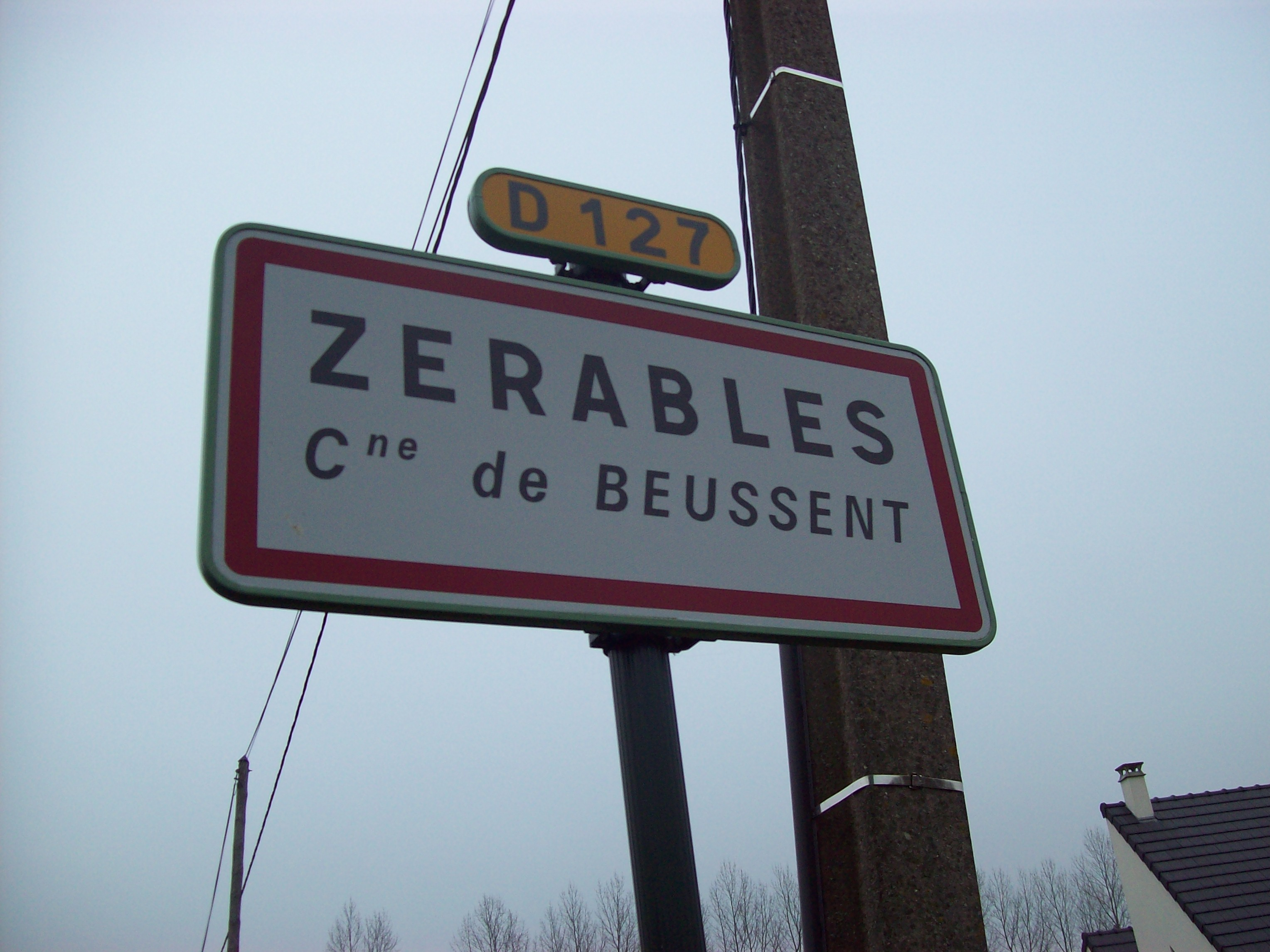
Road sign in Beussent, France – entrance to built up area with an implied 50 kilometres per hour (31 mph) speed limit.

The standardization of traffic signs in Europe commenced with the signing of the 1931 Geneva Convention concerning the Unification of Road Signals by several countries. The 1931 Convention rules were developed in the 1949 Geneva Protocol on Road Signs and Signals and a European Agreement supplementing the 1949 Protocol.

In 1968, the European countries signed the Vienna Convention on Road Traffic treaty, with the aim of standardizing traffic regulations in participating countries to facilitate international road traffic and to increase road safety. Part of the treaty was the Vienna Convention on Road Signs and Signals, which defined the traffic signs and signals. As a result, in Western Europe the traffic signs are well standardized, although there are still some country-specific exceptions, mostly dating from the pre-1968 era.

The principle of the European traffic sign standard is that certain shapes and colours are to be used with consistent meanings:

- Triangular signs (black symbols on a white or yellow background) warn of dangers. The Vienna Convention additionally allows an alternative shape for such signs, namely a right-angled diamond – although in Europe this shape is regularly used only in Ireland.
- Regulatory signs are round: those indicating a prohibition or limit are black on white (or yellow) with a red border; those giving a mandatory order are white on blue.
- Informational and various other secondary signs are of rectangular shape.
- The animals which may be depicted on warning signs include cattle, deer, ducks, elk, frogs, horses, sheep, monkeys (in Gibraltar), and polar bears (on Svalbard). The Convention allows any animal image to be used.

The signposting of road numbers also differs greatly, except that European route numbers, if displayed, are always indicated using white characters on a green rectangle. European route numbers are, however, not signed at all in the United Kingdom, Albania, Iceland and Andorra.

The Convention recommends that certain signs – such as "STOP", "ZONE", etc. – be in English; however, use of the local language is also permitted. If a language uses non-Latin characters, a Latin-script transliteration of the names of cities and other important places should also be given. Road signs in Ireland are bilingual, using Irish and English. Wales similarly uses bilingual Welsh–English signs, while some parts of Scotland have bilingual Scottish Gaelic–English signs. Finland also uses bilingual signs, in Finnish and Swedish. Signs in Belgium are in French, Dutch, or German depending on the region. In the Brussels Capital Region, road signs are in both French and Dutch. Signs in Switzerland are in French, German, Italian, or Romansh depending on the canton.

For countries driving on the left, the convention stipulates that the traffic signs should be mirror images of those used in countries driving on the right. This practice, however, is not systematically followed in the four European countries driving on the left – the United Kingdom, Cyprus, Malta and Ireland. The convention permits the use of two background colours for danger and prohibition signs: white or yellow. Most countries use white, with a few – such as Finland, Iceland, Poland and Sweden – opting for yellow as this tends to improve the winter-time visibility of signs in areas where snow is prevalent. In some countries, such as France or Italy, white is the normal background colour for such signs, but yellow is used for temporary signage (as, for example, at road works).

European countries – with the notable exception of the United Kingdom, where distances and lengths are indicated in miles, yards, feet, and inches, and speed limits are expressed in miles per hour – use the metric system on road signs. European traffic signs have been designed with the principles of heraldry in mind; i.e., the sign must be clear and able to be resolved at a glance. Most traffic signs conform to heraldic tincture rules, and use symbols rather than written texts for better semiotic clarity.

=== Albania ===
Albanian road signs are predominantly based on the Italian sign system, hence both follow the same convention on road sign design set out by the Vienna Convention on Road Signs and Signals.

=== Andorra ===
Road signs in Andorra are similar to those set out in the Vienna Convention on Road Signs and Signals. Its direction signage is always white. Other signs, such as warning and regulatory, are identical to those used in Spain.

Unlike other European countries, route numbers are not always shown. This can cause problems for drivers from neighbouring European countries when trying to find an international destination.

=== Belarus ===
Road signs in Belarus are visually not much different from those neighboring post-Soviet countries like Russia and Ukraine. Inscriptions on road signs, including names of settlements, are written in Belarusian or Russian, most often in Belarusian.

=== Croatia ===
Croatian road signs follow the Vienna Convention (SFR Yugoslavia was the original signatory for Croatia, which is now a contracting party itself).

In the first years following Croatia's independence, its traffic signs were the same as in the rest of the former Yugoslavia. In the early 2000s, replacement of the yellow background of warning signs began, and new signs now use a white background.

=== Greece ===
While road signs in Greece do largely resemble those in use elsewhere in Europe, a notable exception to this is the use of a yellow background for warning signs.

=== Iceland ===
Although Iceland is not a signatory to the Vienna Convention on Road Signs and Signals, road signs in Iceland follow the Vienna Convention guidelines. Warning and regulatory, specifically prohibitory, signs use a yellow background.

=== Ireland ===
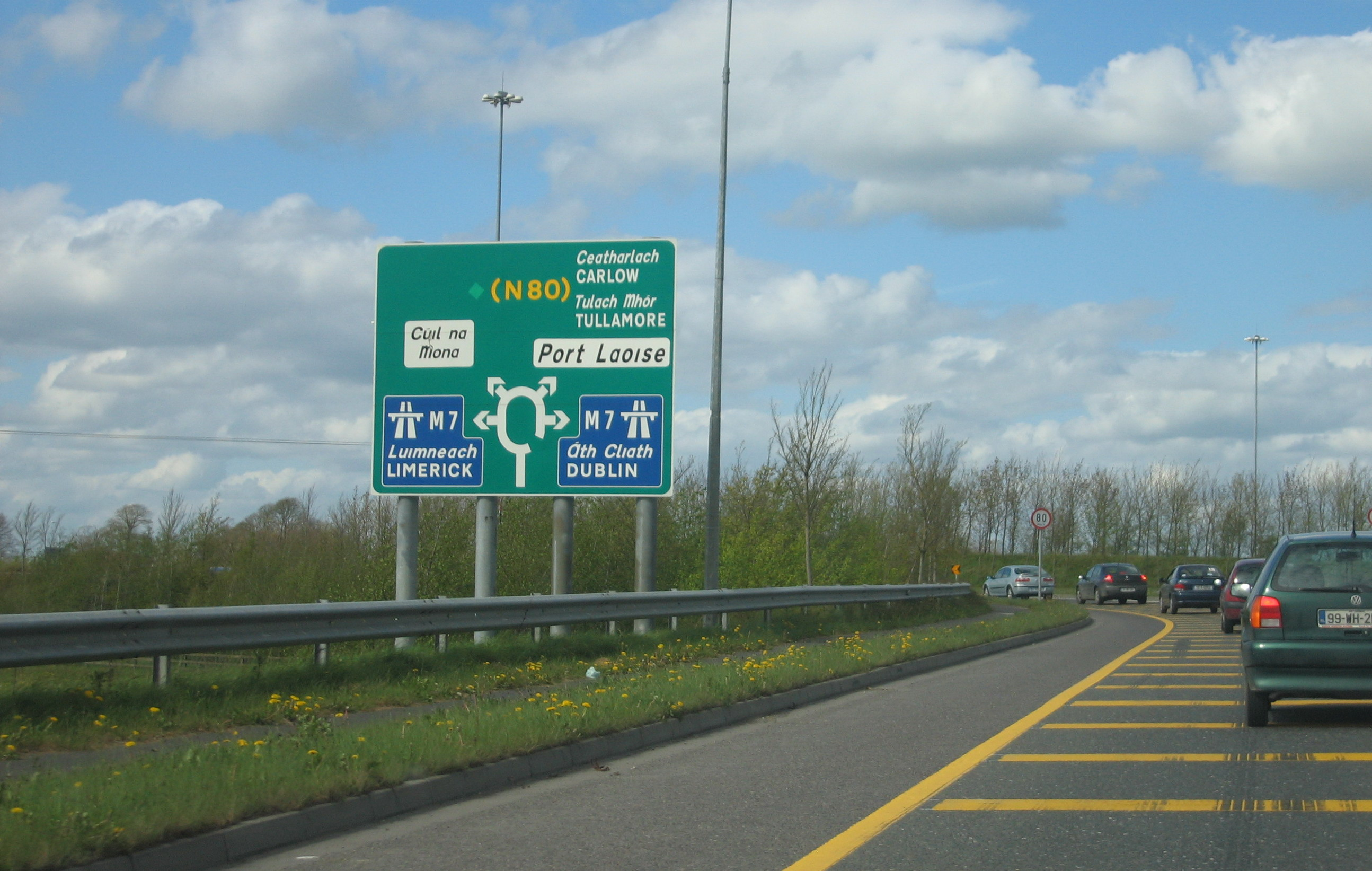
Advance directional sign in for a roundabout in Ireland. The green background indicates that this sign is on a national road, with the blue patches left and right indicating a motorway (with symbol) and the white patches indicating a regional road or local road.

Irish warning sign

Until the partition of Ireland in 1922 and the independence of the Irish Free State (now the Republic of Ireland), British standards applied across the island. In 1926 road sign standards similar to those used in the UK at the time were adopted. Law requires that the signs be written in both Irish and English.

In 1956, warning road signs in the Republic were changed from the UK standard with the adoption of US-style "diamond" signs for many road hazard warnings. A number of regulatory signs were also introduced.

Directional signage is similar to current United Kingdom standards, in that the same colours and typefaces are used. However, Irish text is rendered in a unique oblique variant of the Transport typeface.

In line with the majority of Europe, Ireland uses the metric system, which has been displayed on directional signs based on the Worboys Committee standard since 1977 and, upon adopting metric speed limits, on speed limit signs since 2005.

=== Liechtenstein ===
Road signs in Liechtenstein use the same design as those used in Switzerland.

=== Malta ===
Road signs in Malta use a mixture of British and Italian designs. As Malta drives on the left, some Italian signs are therefore mirrored to reflect this system. Information signs are often bilingual, displaying text English and Maltese.

=== Moldova ===
Road signs in Moldova are in some ways similar in design to those used in the Soviet Union before its dissolution in 1991. However, modern road signs in Moldova tend to follow those used in Romania.

=== Netherlands ===
Road signs in the Netherlands follow the Vienna Convention. Its directional signs are unique in that blue is the only colour used for the background, regardless of the classification of the road.

Information intended for cyclists always appear on white signs with red or green letters.

The Dutch RWS (formerly ANWB) typeface was replaced by a new font, named ANWB-Uu (also known as Redesign), on some signs in the country. The typeface was developed in 1997 and appeared on many signs but has been discontinued since 2015. The language of the signs is typically Dutch, though bilingual signs may be used when the information is relevant for tourists.

=== Norway ===
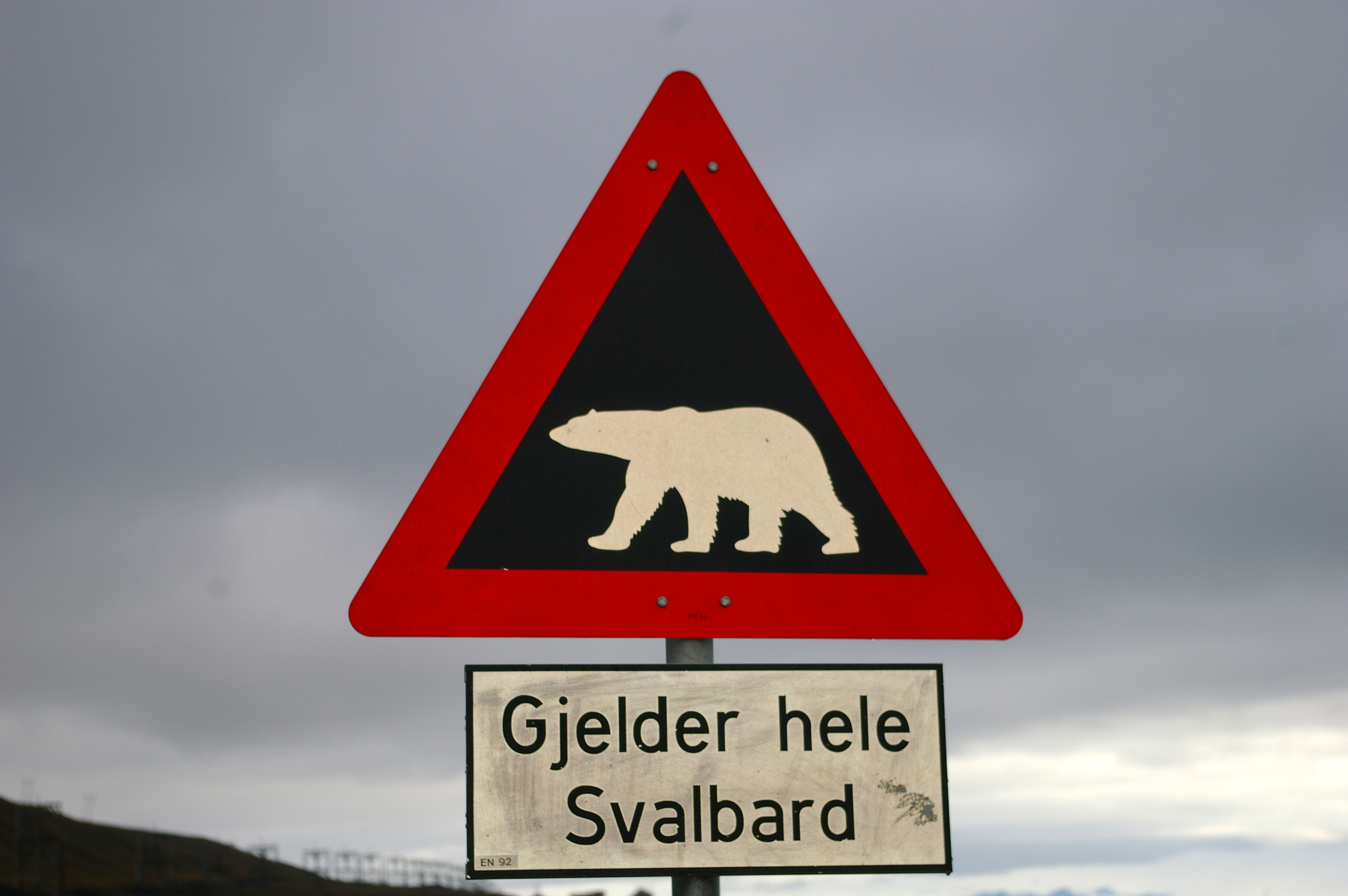
Unique warning sign for polar bears in Svalbard.

=== Poland ===
The road signs in Poland follow the Vienna convention. Poland uses yellow as the background colour for warning signs (an alternative allowed under the convention), rather than the much more widely adopted white.

=== Russia ===
Road signs in Russia follow the Vienna Convention, specified in the GOST standard 52290-2004 (the Soviet Union was an original signatory to the convention, but only a few post-Soviet states are signatories to the convention).

European route numbers are signposted on direction signs in the European part of Russia, but are replaced by Asian Highway route numbers in the Asian part.

In February 2019, the traffic police has supported proposals for the introduction of reduced sizes of road signs. The idea was initiated by the Moscow government. They are planned to be installed throughout Russia after a successful experiment. The allowable size of signs will be reduced to 40 cm (16 inches) in diameter, and in some cases to 35 cm (14 inches), which is almost half the current standard of 60 cm (24 inches).

=== Slovakia ===
Modern road signs in use in Slovakia since 2019 are similar in design to those used in Germany, though the main difference is the typeface used. Road signs from before 2019 are permitted to be left in place until 2034.

=== Sweden ===
Swedish elk warning sign

Road signs in Sweden mostly follow the Vienna Convention, though it notably uses yellow for the background of its warning and prohibitory signs. City names are written in uppercase letters.

=== Switzerland ===
Mountain postal road sign indicating priority to public transport on (mountain) roads; drivers must follow instructions given by public bus drivers.

Swiss road signs mostly follow the Vienna Convention with a few adaptations and exceptions. Distances and other measurements are displayed in metric units.

Bicycle and mountain bike routes, and routes for vehicle-like transport means are white text on falu red background.

=== Ukraine ===
Road signs in Ukraine broadly conform to European norms, and they are based on the road signage systems used consistently throughout the former USSR. They are written mostly in English and Ukrainian.

=== United Kingdom ===
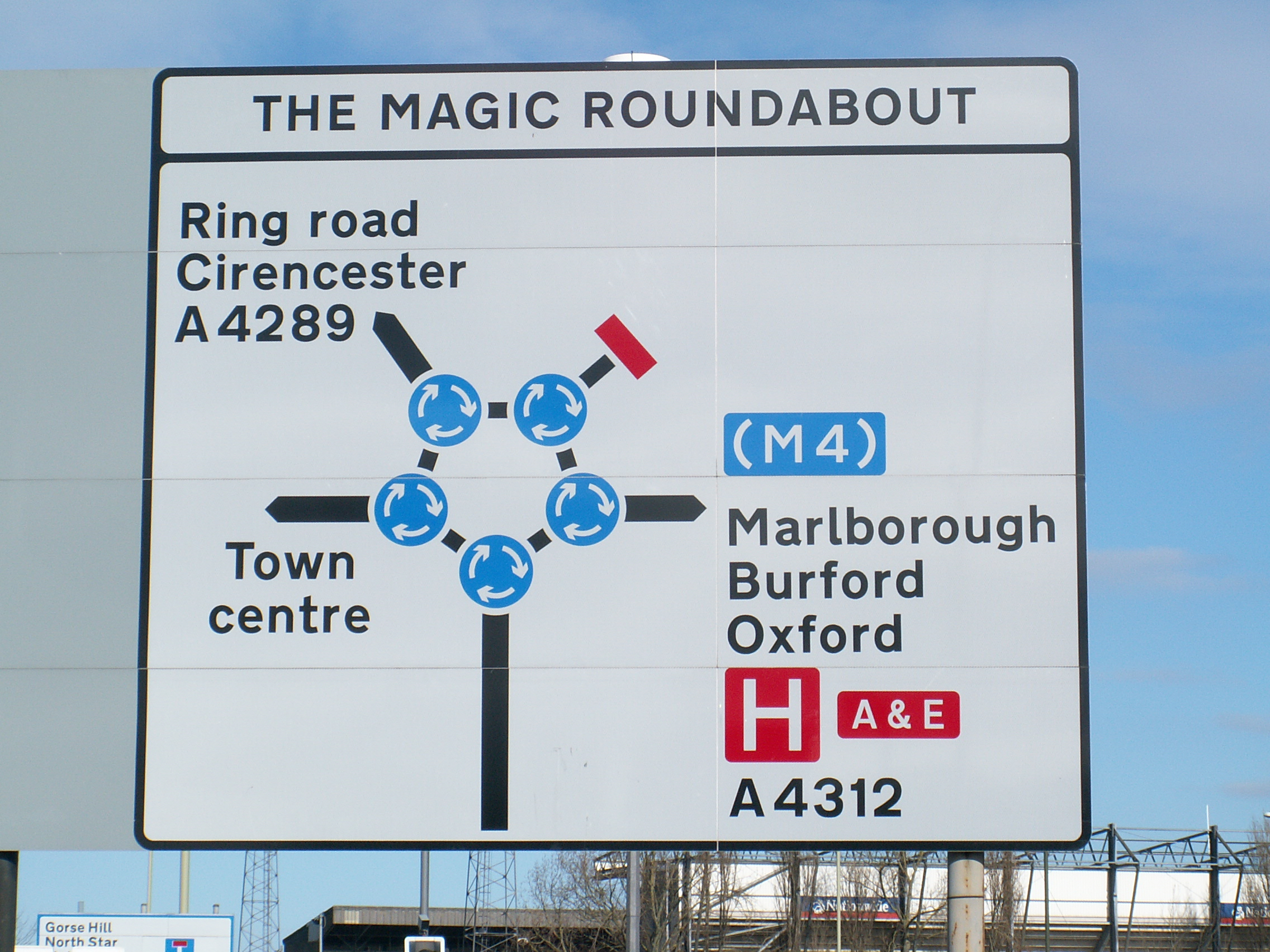
One of the more unusual UK road signs, at the Magic Roundabout in Swindon

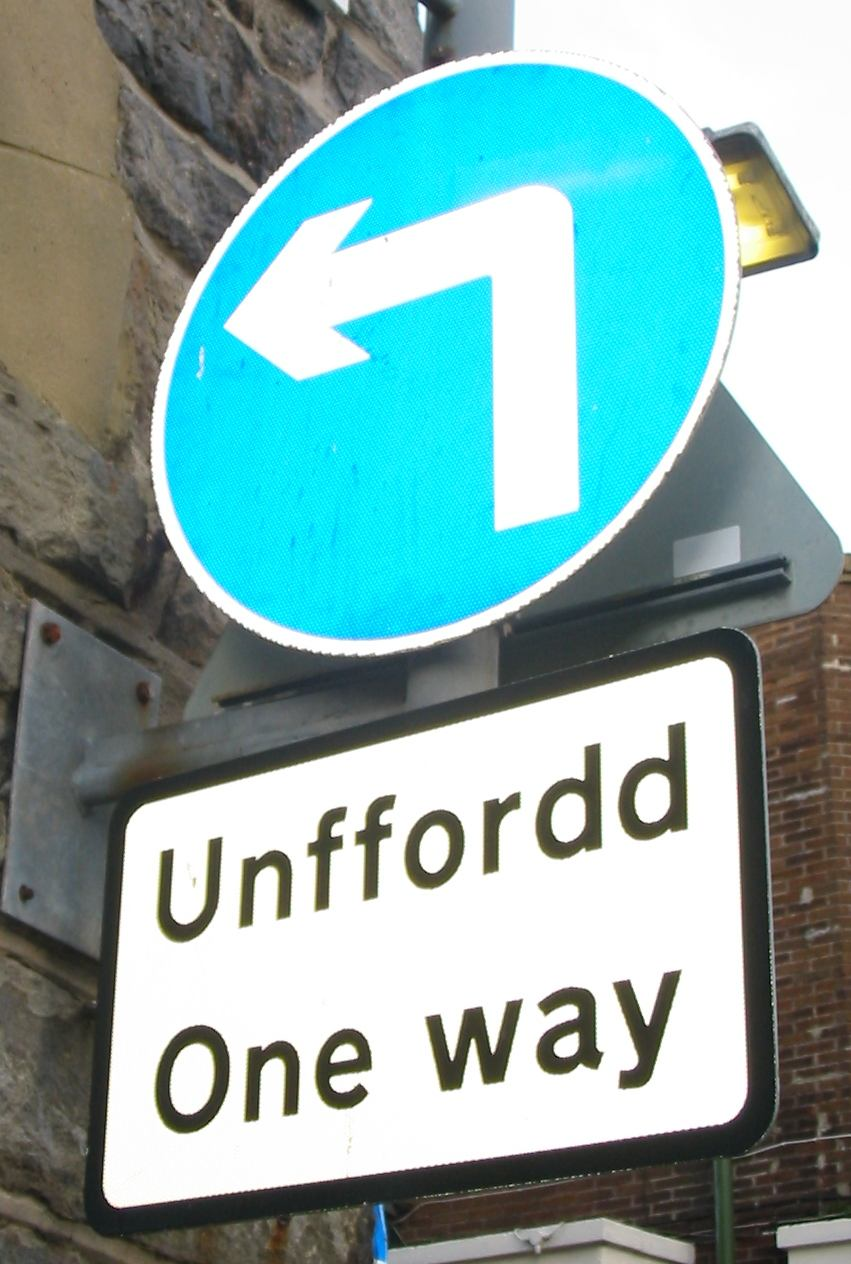
Bilingual road sign in Wales

Traffic signing in the UK conforms broadly to European norms, though a number of signs are unique to Britain and direction signs omit European route numbers. The current sign system, introduced on 1 January 1965, was developed in the late 1950s and early 1960s by the Anderson Committee, which established the motorway signing system, and by the Worboys Committee, which reformed signing for existing all-purpose roads.

The UK remains the only Commonwealth country to use imperial measurements for distance and speed, although "authorised weight" signs have been in metric tonnes since 1981 and there is currently a dual-unit (metric first) option for height and width restriction signage, intended for use on safety grounds. Additionally, kilometre signs are installed at intervals of 500 metres (1,600 ft) indicating the distance from the start of the motorway.

Signs are generally bilingual in all parts of Wales (English/Welsh or Welsh/English), and similar signs are beginning to be seen in parts of the Scottish Highlands (Scottish Gaelic/English).

All signs and their associated regulations can be found in the Traffic Signs Regulations and General Directions, and are complemented by the various chapters of the Traffic Signs Manual.

== Oceania ==
=== Australia ===
For road signs in Australia, this is covered by AS 1742 which is unofficially known as Manual of Uniform Traffic Control Devices for Australia, and it serves as a similar role to the FHWA MUTCD. As a result, road signs in Australia closely follow those used in America, but some sign designs closely follow the ones used in the United Kingdom.

- Australian warning signs have a yellow diamond with a black legend, following America's practice. Australia remains the only country that still has the text-based version of the low-clearance signage. (Most other countries now use vertical arrows in between the clearance height.)
- Australian temporary warning signs are rectangular, following the United Kingdom practice, but they differ from the British temporary warning signs by having a yellow, or an orange background instead.
- Australian regulatory signs are similar to those used in America, except (at least since 1974) the speed limit signs which bear the red circle legend.

=== New Zealand ===
New Zealand road signs are generally influenced both by American and European practices.

Warning signs are diamond-shaped with a yellow background for permanent warnings, and an orange background for temporary warnings. They are somewhat more pictorial than their American counterparts. This is also true for Canadian and Mexican signage.

Regulatory signs also follow European practice, with a white circle with a red border indicating prohibitive actions, and a blue circle indicating mandatory actions. White rectangular signs with a red border indicate lane usage directions. Information and direction signs are rectangular, with a green background indicating a state highway, a blue background for all other roads and all services (except in some, where directional signage is white), and a brown background for tourist attractions.

Before 1987, most road signs had black backgrounds – diamonds indicated warnings, and rectangles indicated regulatory actions (with the exception of the Give Way sign (an inverted trapezium), and Stop sign and speed limit signs (which were the same as today)). Information signs were yellow, and direction signage was green on motorways and black everywhere else.

=== Papua New Guinea ===
Road signs in Papua New Guinea are standardised and closely follow those used in Australia with certain distinctions. They are written in English.

== North America ==
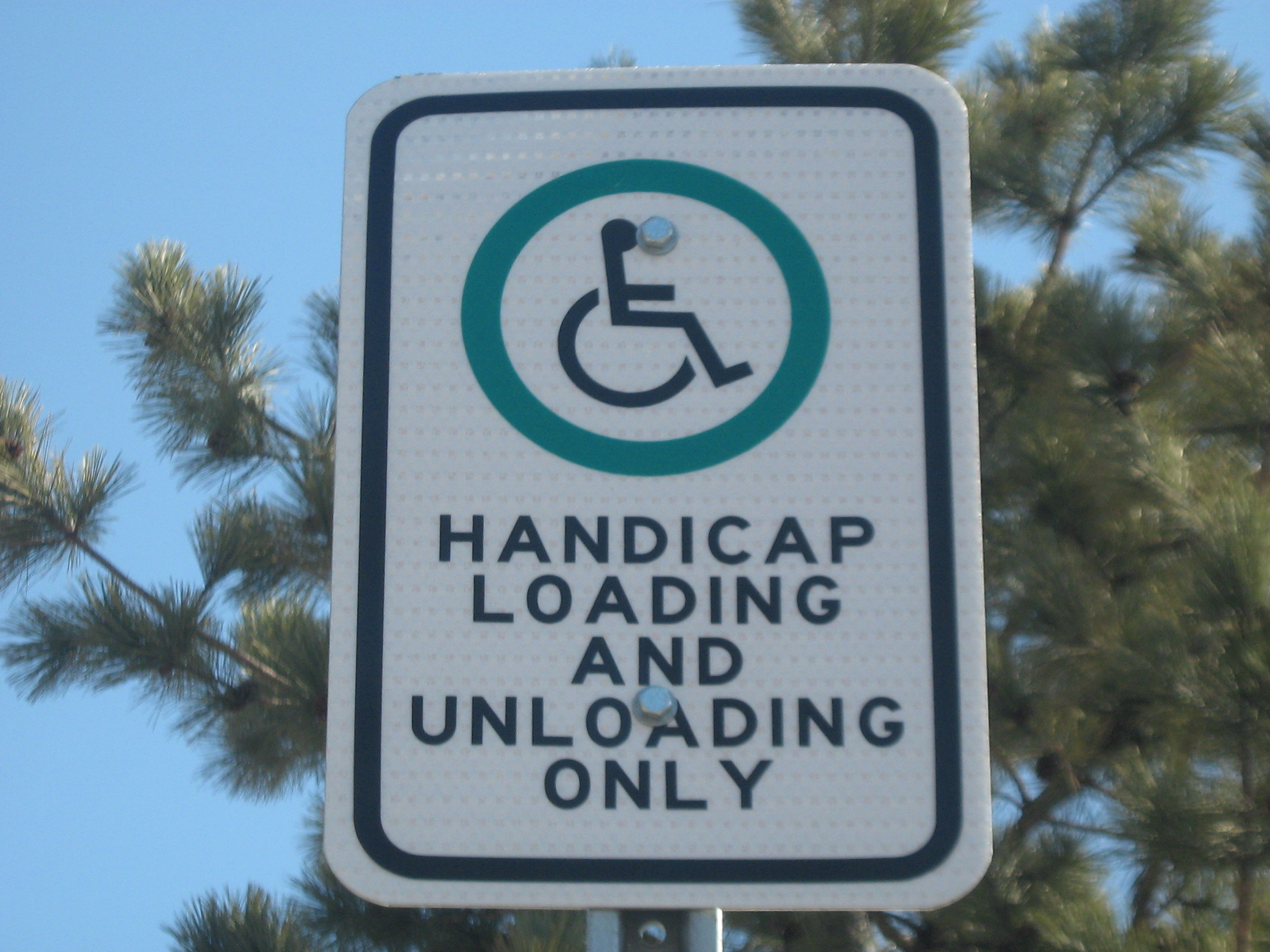
Handicap sign

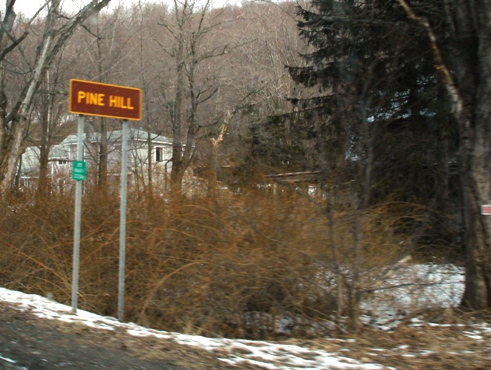
One of Catskill Park's distinctive brown town signs with yellow text, showing the hamlet of Pine Hill

In North America (including Mexico) these colours normally have these meanings. These are standard but exceptions may exist, especially outside the US:

- red with white for stop signs, yield, and forbidden actions (such as No Parking)
- green with white letters for informational signs, such as directions, distances, and places
- brown with white letters for signs to parks, historic sites, ski areas, forests, and campgrounds
- blue with white symbols (or business logos) for rest areas, food, gasoline, hospitals, lodging, and other services
- white with black (or red) letters for regulatory signs, such as speed limits (or parking)
- yellow with black letters and symbols for warning signs, such as curves and school zones
- orange with black letters for temporary traffic control zones and detours associated with road construction
- purple for "lanes restricted to use only by vehicles with registered electronic toll collection (ETC) accounts", such as EZPass.
- black with white letters or arrows for lane use.

The US Manual on Uniform Traffic Control Devices (MUTCD) prescribes four other colours:

- fluorescent yellow-green with black symbols for school zone, school bus stop, pedestrian, playground, and bicycle warning signs
- fluorescent pink with black letters and symbols for incident management signs
- coral and light blue, which are unassigned but reserved for potential future use.

Regulatory signs are also sometimes seen with white letters on red or black signs. In Quebec, blue is often used for public services such as rest areas; many black-on-yellow signs are red-on-white instead.

Many US states and Canadian provinces now use fluorescent orange for construction signs.

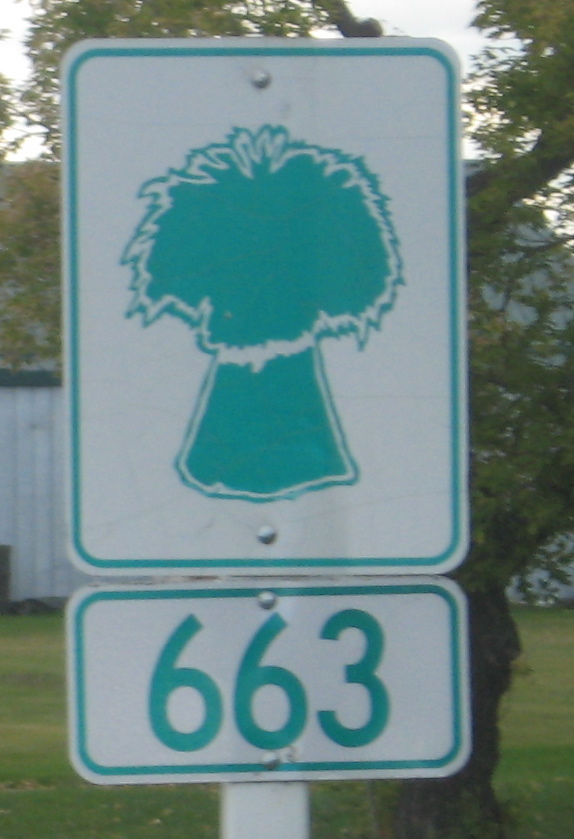
Rural highway sign, Saskatchewan.

Highway symbols and markers

Every state in the U.S. and province in Canada has different markers for its own highways, but uses standard ones for all federal highways. Many special highways – such as the Queen Elizabeth Way, Trans-Canada Highway, and various auto trails in the U.S. – have used unique signs. Counties in the US sometimes use a pentagonal blue sign with yellow letters for numbered county roads, though the use is inconsistent even within states.

In Australia, the five states have alphanumeric markers for their own highways, based on the Great Britain road numbering scheme of 1963. Tasmania was the first state to implement this scheme in 1979. "M" roads signified motorways, "A" roads signified primary highways, "B" roads signified less significant roads and "C" roads linked smaller settlements. Western Australia never implemented the alphanumeric scheme, instead retaining the shield system.

Units

Distances are displayed using the metric system in all countries except for the United States, where English units are used. However, the MUTCD 2000 and 2003 editions developed by the Federal Highway Administration contain (but rarely used) metric versions of the signs, some of which do get used outside of the US, in particular, Belize and Guyana.

Languages

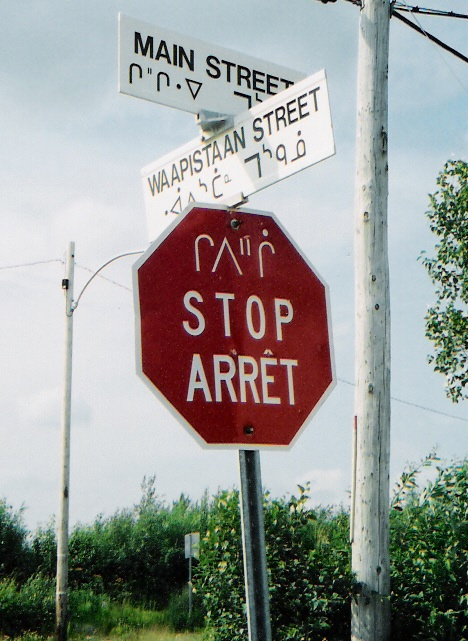
Multilingual road signs in Mistissini, Quebec in Cree, English, and French.

Where signs use a language, the recognized language/s of the area is normally used. Signs in most of the US, Canada, Australia, and New Zealand are in English. Quebec uses French. In contrast, the New Brunswick, Jacques-Cartier, and Champlain bridges, in Montreal (as well as some parts in the West Island), use both English and French, and a number of other provinces and states, such as Ontario, Manitoba, and Vermont use bilingual French–English signs in certain localities. Mexico uses Spanish. Within a few miles of the US–Mexico border, road signs are often in English and Spanish in places like San Diego, Yuma, and El Paso. Indigenous languages, mainly Nahuatl as well as some Mayan languages, have been used as well.

In both Canada and Mexico, pictorial signs are common compared to the US, where some signs are simply written in English.

Typefaces

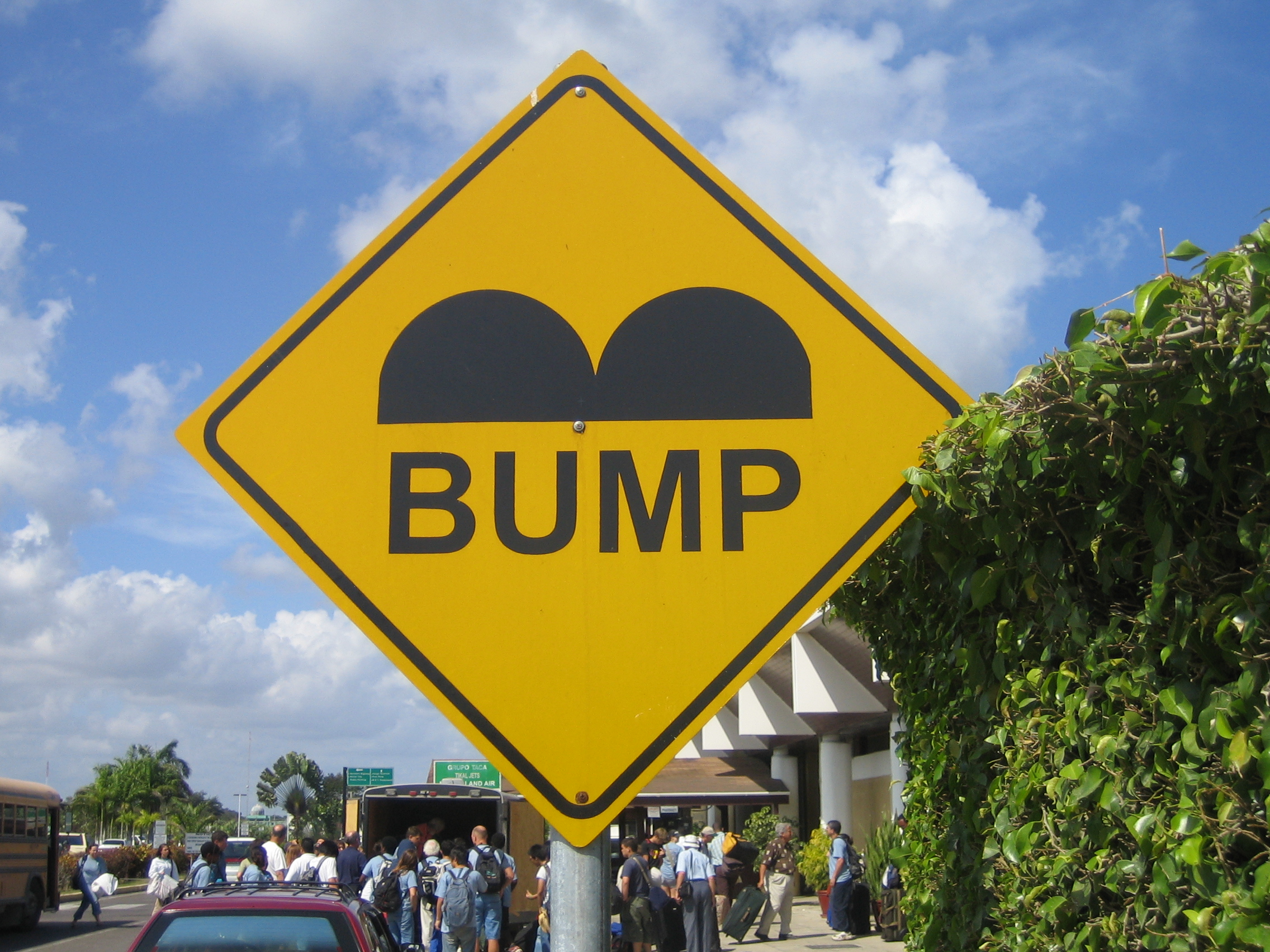
Speed bump sign in Belize.

The typefaces predominantly used on signs in the US and Canada are the FHWA alphabet series (Series B through Series F and Series E Modified). Details of letter shape and spacing for these alphabet series are given in "Standard Alphabets for Traffic Control Devices", first published by the Bureau of Public Roads (BPR) in 1945 and subsequently updated by the Federal Highway Administration (FHWA). It is now part of Standard Highway Signs (SHS), the companion volume to the MUTCD which gives full design details for signfaces.

Initially, all the alphabet series consisted of uppercase letters and digits only, although lowercase extensions were provided for each alphabet series in a 2002 revision of SHS. Series B through Series F evolved from identically named alphabet series which were introduced in 1927.

Straight-stroke letters in the 1927 series were substantially similar to their modern equivalents, but unrounded glyphs were used for letters such as B, C, D, etc., to permit more uniform fabrication of signs by illiterate painters. Various state highway departments and the federal BPR experimented with rounded versions of these letters in the following two decades.

The modern, rounded alphabet series was finally standardized in 1945 after rounded versions of some letters (with widths loosely appropriate for Series C or D) were specified as an option in the 1935 MUTCD and draft versions of the new typefaces had been used in 1942 for guide signs on the newly constructed Pentagon road network.

The mixed-case alphabet now called Series E Modified, which is the standard for destination legend on freeway guide signs, originally existed in two parts: an all-uppercase Series E Modified, which was essentially similar to Series E, except for a larger stroke width, and a lowercase-only alphabet. Both parts were developed by the California Division of Highways (now Caltrans) for use on freeways in 1948–1950.

Initially, the Division used all-uppercase Series E Modified for button-reflectorized letters on ground-mounted signs and mixed-case legend (lowercase letters with Series D capitals) for externally illuminated overhead guide signs. Several Eastern turnpike authorities blended all-uppercase Series E Modified with the lowercase alphabet for destination legends on their guide signs.

Eventually, this combination was accepted for destination legend in the first manual for signing Interstate highways, which was published in 1958 by the American Association of State Highway Officials and adopted as the national standard by the BPR.

Uses of non-FHWA typefaces

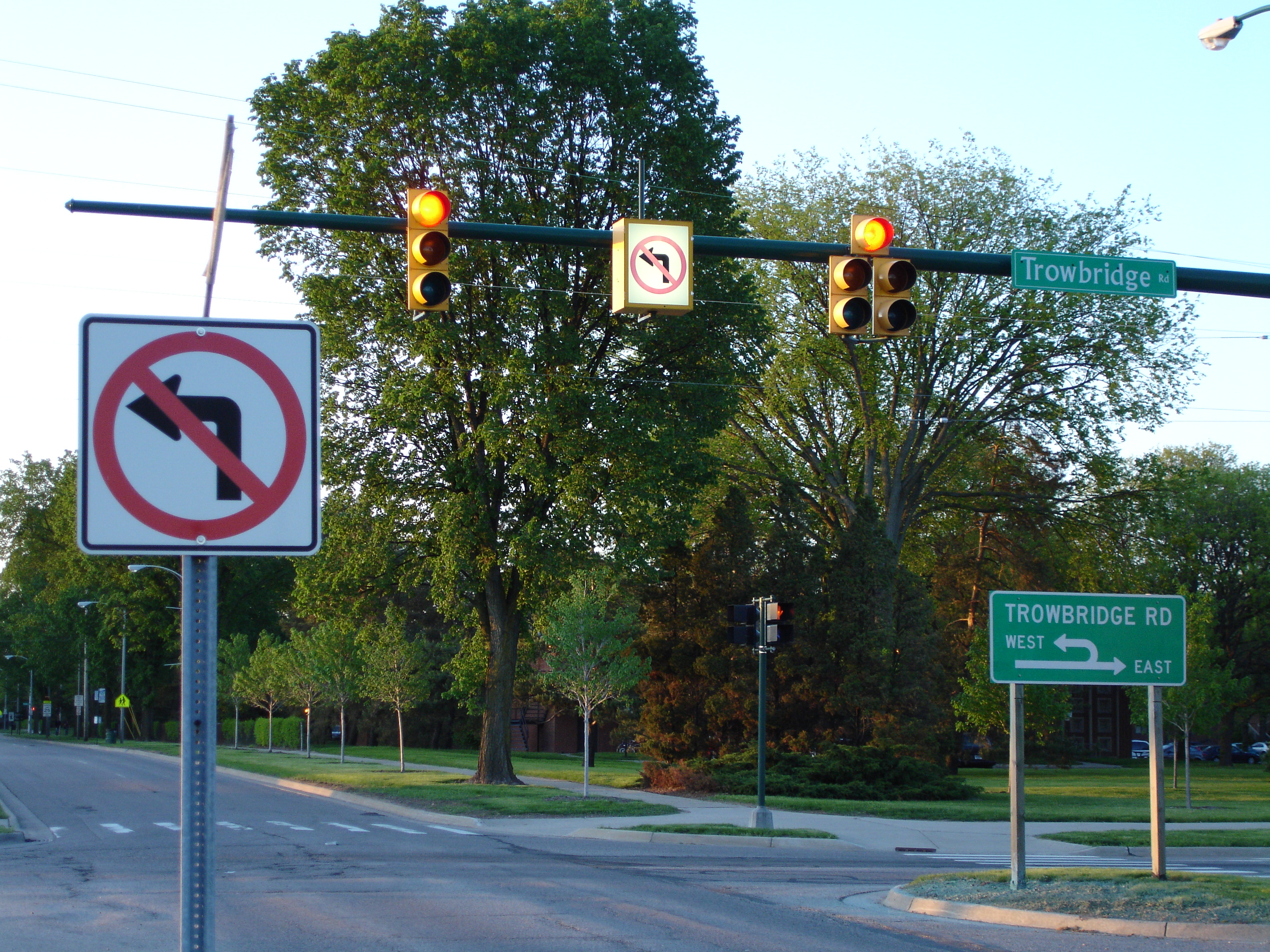
Some traffic signs, such as the left-turn prohibition sign hanging from this gantry, are lit for better visibility, particularly at night or in inclement weather.

The US National Park Service uses NPS Rawlinson Roadway, a serif typeface, for guide signage; it typically appears on a brown background. Rawlinson has replaced Clarendon as the official NPS typeface, but some states still use Clarendon for recreational signage.

Georgia, in the past, used uppercase Series D with a custom lowercase alphabet on its freeway guide signs; the most distinctive feature of this typeface is the lack of a dot on lowercase i and lowercase j. This was discontinued in 2012. More recent installations appear to include dots.

The Clearview typeface, developed by US researchers to provide improved legibility, is permitted for light legend on dark backgrounds under FHWA interim approval. Clearview has seen widespread use by state departments of transportation in Arkansas, Arizona, Illinois, Kentucky, Maryland, Michigan, Ohio, Pennsylvania, Texas, Vermont, and Virginia. The Kansas Turnpike Authority has also introduced Clearview typeface to some of its newer guide signs along the Kansas Turnpike, but the state of Kansas continues to use the FHWA typefaces for signage on its non-tolled Interstates and freeways.

In Canada, the Ministry of Transportation for the Province of British Columbia specifies Clearview for use on its highway guide signs, and its usage has shown up in Ontario on the Don Valley Parkway and Gardiner Expressway in Toronto and on new 400-series highway installations in Hamilton, Halton and Niagara, as well as street signs in various parts of the province. The font is also being used on newer signs in Alberta, Manitoba, and Quebec.

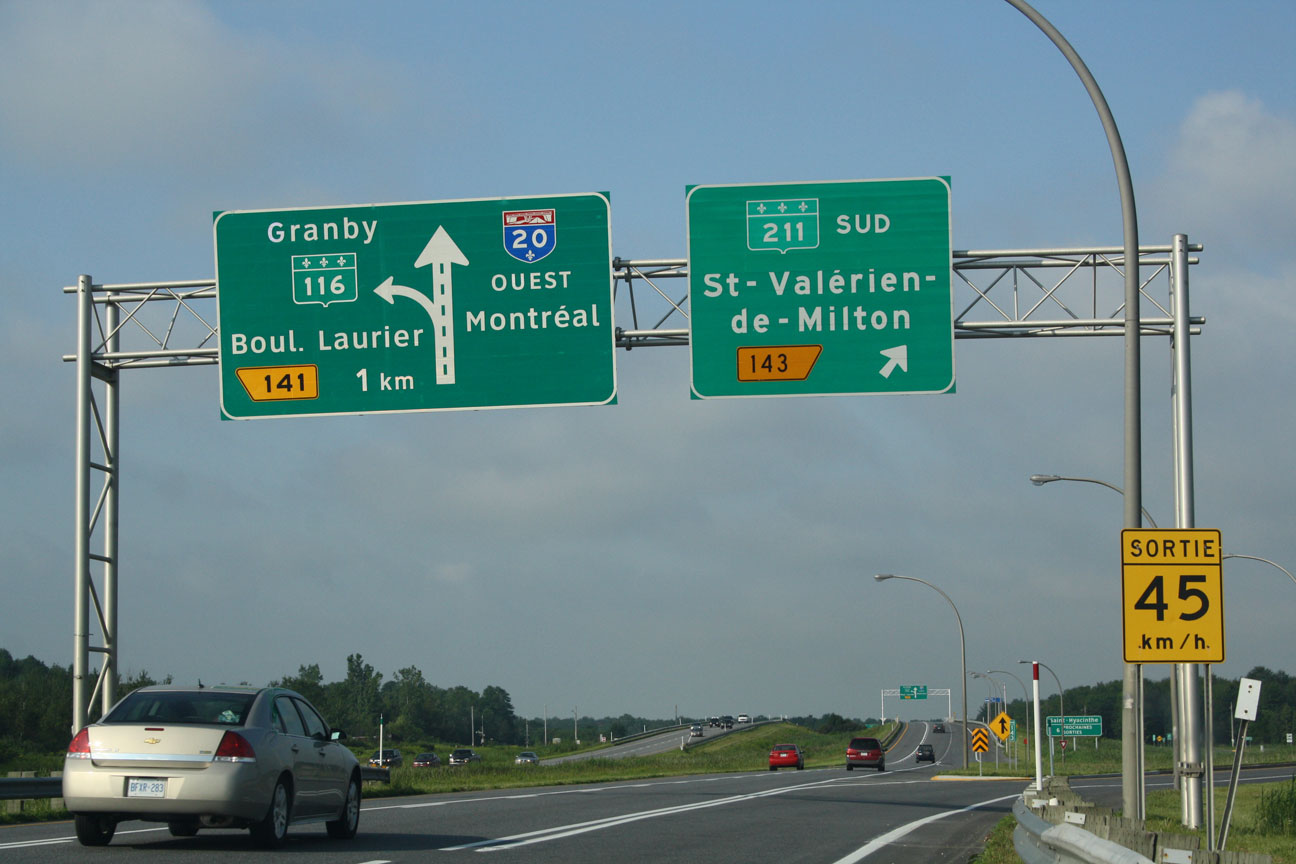
A new Clearview typeface sign beside an old FHWA typeface, Quebec

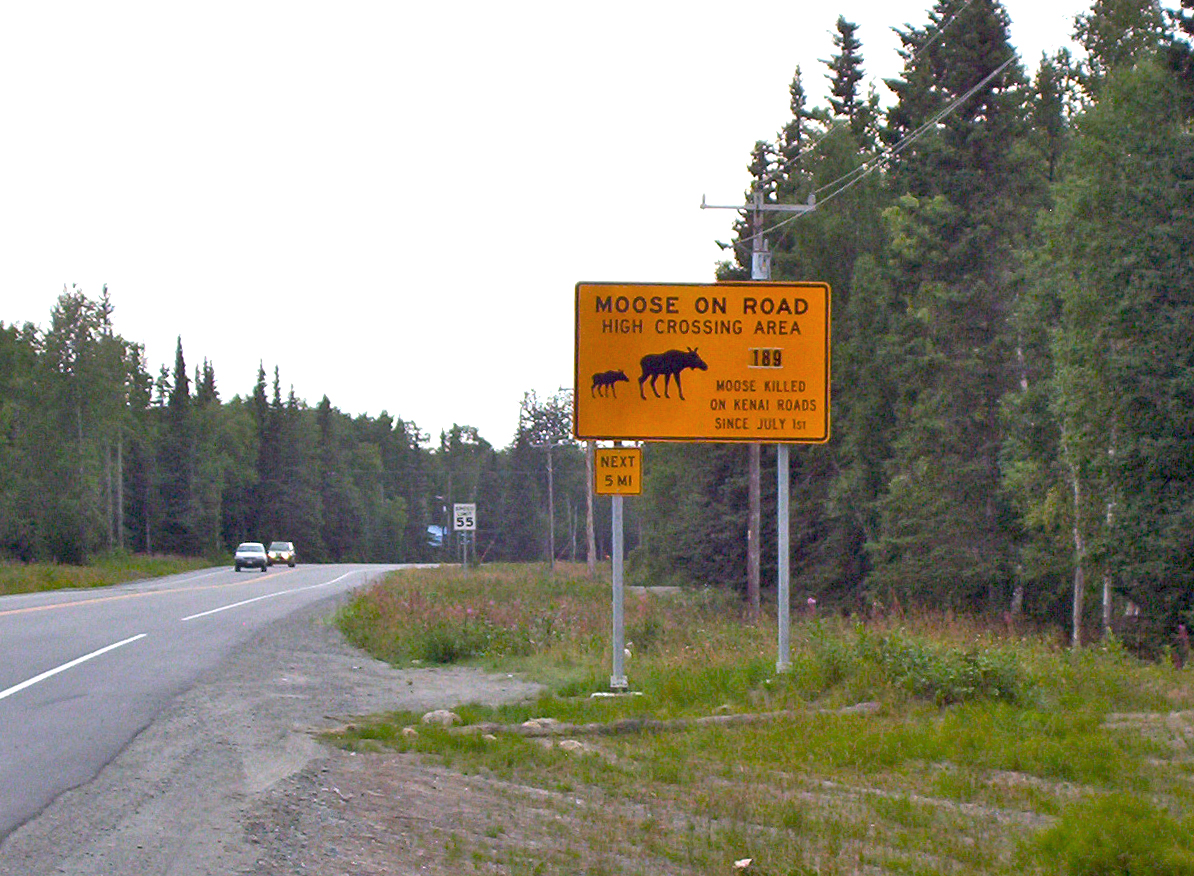
Moose crossing warning with kill-counter, Kenai Peninsula of Alaska.

It is common for local governments, airport authorities, and contractors to fabricate traffic signs using typefaces other than the FHWA series; Helvetica, Futura and Arial are common choices.

=== Canada ===
For road signs in Canada, the Transportation Association of Canada (TAC) publishes its own Manual of Uniform Traffic Control Devices for Canada for use by Canadian jurisdictions. Although it serves a similar role to the FHWA MUTCD, it has been independently developed and has a number of key differences with its US counterpart, most notably the inclusion of bilingual (English/French) signage for jurisdictions such as New Brunswick and Ontario with significant anglophone and francophone population, a heavier reliance on symbols rather than text legends and metric measurements instead of imperial.

The Ministry of Transportation of Ontario (MTO) also has historically used its own MUTCD which bore many similarities to the TAC MUTCDC. However, as of approximately 2000, MTO has been developing the Ontario Traffic Manual (OTM), a series of smaller volumes each covering different aspects of traffic control (e.g., regulatory signs, warning signs, sign design principles, traffic signals, etc.).

=== Central America ===
Road signs in Central American countries heavily influenced by US MUTCD but used metric units instead of imperial/US units and regulated under Manual Centroamericano de Dispositivos Uniformes para el Control del Transito, a Central American equivalent to US MUTCD published by the Central American Integration System (SICA).

=== Mexico ===
Road signs in Mexico are influenced by road signs in America, and are published under Manual de Dispositivos para el Control del Tránsito en Calles y Carreteras. It serves as a similar role to the FHWA MUTCD, but is independently developed and has a number of key differences with the US counterpart, and the language used is Mexican Spanish. Like Canada but unlike America, Mexico had a heavier reliance on symbols than text legends, and metric measurements instead of imperial.

=== United States ===
Road signs in the United States are, for the most part, standardized by federal regulations, most notably in the Manual on Uniform Traffic Control Devices (MUTCD) and its companion volume the Standard Highway Signs (SHS). The MUTCD was most recently updated on 19 December 2023, when the 11th edition was released, and became effective on 18 January 2024, 30 days after publication. States have two years after the effective date to do one of the following options: adopt the revised MUTCD, adopt the revised MUTCD with a state supplement, or adopt a state-specific MUTCD.

==== Puerto Rico ====
Road signs in Puerto Rico share the same design as those used in the mainland United States, but with inscriptions in Spanish instead of English, since Spanish is an official language in Puerto Rico.

== South America and the Caribbean ==
Road signs in South America and the Caribbean vary from country to country. For the most part, conventions in signage tend to resemble United States signage conventions more so than European and Asian conventions. For example, warning signs are typically diamond-shaped and yellow rather than triangular and white. Some variations include the "parking" and "no parking" signs, which contain either a letter "E" or "P", depending on which word is used locally for "parking" (Spanish estacionamiento or parqueo, Portuguese estacionamento), as well as the stop sign, which usually reads "pare" or "alto". Notable exceptions include speed limit signs, which follow the European conventions, and the "no entry" sign, often replaced with a crossed upwards arrow.

Of all the countries in South America, only 4 countries Brazil, Chile, Ecuador and Venezuela have signed the Vienna Convention on Road Signs and Signals. Chile is also the only country in South America to have ratified this convention.

=== Cuba ===
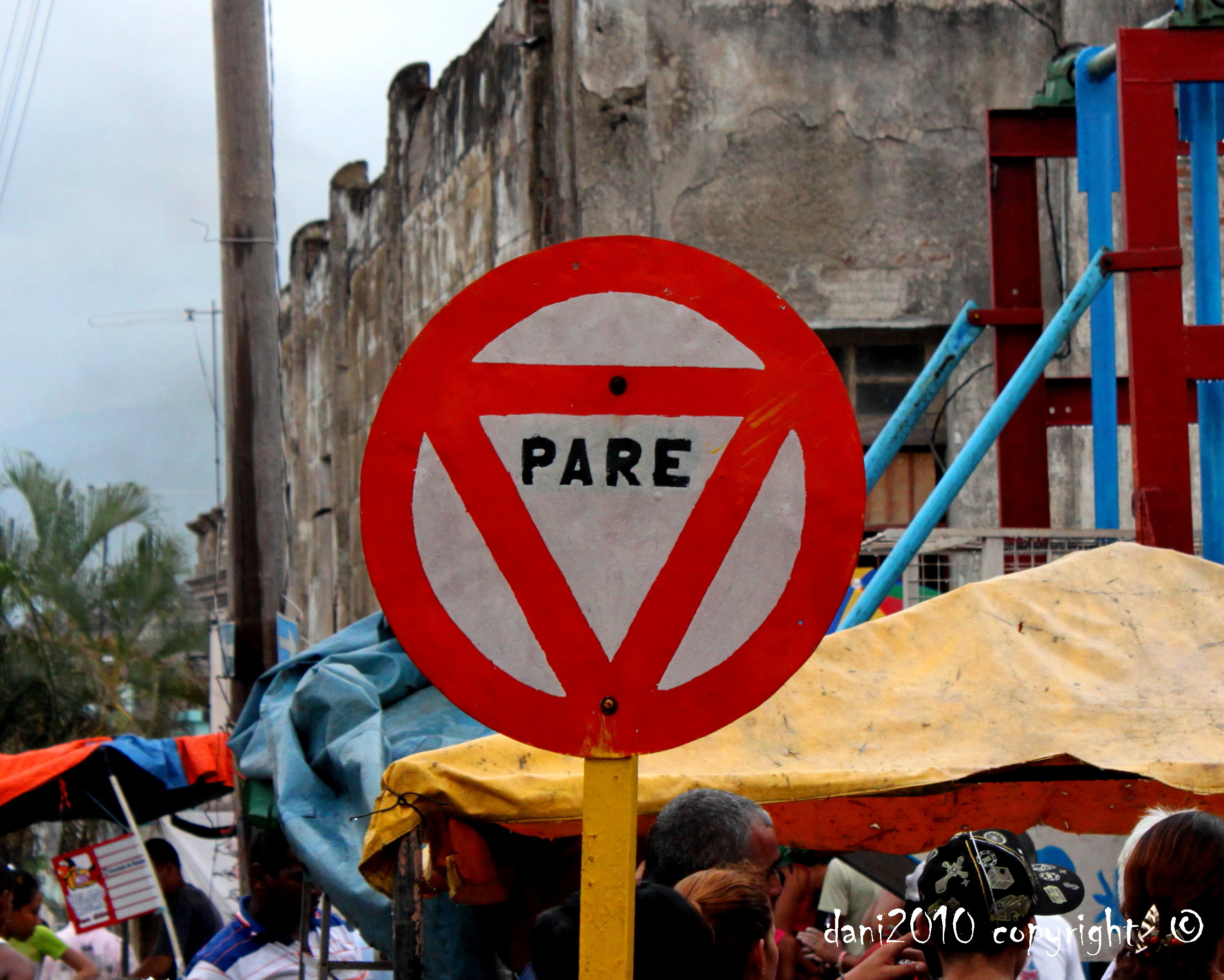
Stop sign used in Cuba

Road signs in Cuba are very similar to those used in European countries and generally conform to the Vienna Convention on Road Signs and Signals. On September 30, 1977, Cuba acceded to the Convention. Cuba still uses a circular STOP sign, with a triangle inside, which was used in the past in several European countries.

=== Haiti ===
Road signs in Haiti are standardized road signs closely following those used in France with certain distinctions. They are written in French and Haitian Creole.

== Road sign colours ==
Roads can be motorways, expressways or other routes. In many countries, expressways share the same colour as primary routes, but there are some exceptions where they share the colour of motorways (Austria, Liechtenstein, Hungary, Switzerland, Spain, Sweden) or have their own colour (the countries comprising former Yugoslavia employ white text on blue specifically for expressways).

When it comes to motorways and route colours, the following schemes are adopted:

- white-on-green, white-on-blue: employed in Albania, all countries of the former Soviet Union, Czechia, Cyprus, Finland, Greece (although Greek text is displayed in yellow), Italy, Liechtenstein, Romania, Slovakia, Sweden, Switzerland and Türkiye.
- white-on-blue, black-on-white (freeway): employed in Austria.
- white-on-green, red-on-white (freeway): only employed in Denmark.
- white-on-blue, white-on-green: employed in France, Hungary, Ireland, Poland, Portugal, Spain, the United Kingdom, Chile, Morocco, South Africa, Saudi Arabia and the United Arab Emirates.
- white-on-blue, black-on-yellow: employed in Germany and Norway.
- black-on-yellow: employed in Iceland (where there are no expressways or motorways).
- white-on-blue for both: employed in the Netherlands.
- white-on-green for both: employed in China and the United States, most of the Asian and American continents, as well as Australia and New Zealand.

Local traffic road signs usually employ black text on white. Exceptions are Croatia (yellow-on-black in some cases), Finland (white-on-black), Austria and Spain (white-on-green), as well as Denmark, Iceland and Poland (blue-on-white).

Tourist sighting signs usually employ white on some shade of brown.

Detours use black on a shade of yellow or orange.

== Typefaces ==
Typefaces used on road signage vary from country to country. Usually a country will have a standardized typeface throughout the country. In some countries however, it is not unlikely to find other typefaces in use — as well as road signs with the wrong typeface printed by manufacturers who default on some other font. The following list show-cases what is the mostly standardized typeface of each country, outlining however significant variations.

- Arial (Example), typically Arial Bold, is used exclusively in Azerbaijan and Mongolia, as well as in Laos and Myanmar for English text or Latin transliterations.
  - Arial Narrow is used in Estonia, with wider letter spacing.
  - Arial Black is frequently used in Algeria and Tunisia for Latin transliterations.
  - Arial, which was Microsoft's default typeface during 1992–2007 period, is often used as alternative to the standard typeface in Belarus, Lithuania, North Macedonia, Moldova, Slovenia, Somalia, Taiwan, Turkey and Ukraine.
- ASV Codar (مثال) is used for Arabic text in Morocco.
- Boutros Advertisers Naskh is used for Arabic text in Bahrain, Iraq, Kuwait, Lebanon, Oman, Qatar, Saudi Arabia, Syria, the United Arab Emirates and Yemen.
- Caractères (Example) is used in France, as well as in Francophone Africa, Haiti and Monaco.
- Clearview (Example) is used in some states in the United States, some provinces in Canada, Brazil, Panama, Indonesia, Philippines and Sri Lanka. It is used on urban roads in Israel.
- DIN 1451 (Example) used in Germany, as well as Czechia, Greece (on motorways), Latvia, Syria, Vietnam (under the name Giaothong) and the majority of SADC countries (of which Angola formerly using Transport, Madagascar formerly using Caractères and Namibia formerly using Highway Gothic)
  - Austria is a variant of DIN 1451 that was used in Austria until 2010.
  - Hungary does not use a defined typeface; however it resembles DIN 1451 closely (Example).
  - An older variant of DIN 1451 is used in Iraq for English text or Latin transliterations.
- Frutiger (Example) is used in Switzerland and Liechtenstein, as well as for the numbers in Japan.
- Gill Sans (Example) was used on road signs in East Germany in 1978–1990 before reunification, formerly using DIN 1451 like West Germany.
- GOST 10807-78 (EXAMPLE/ПРИМЕР/მაგალითი/ՕՐԻՆԱԿ) is used in most countries formerly part of the Soviet Union.
- Hangil and Panno (Example/예) are both used in South Korea.
- Helvetica (Example) is used in Åland and Luxembourg. It was formerly used in Japan and South Korea.
  - Cambodia and China use Helvetica for English texts or Latin transliterations.
  - A variant of Helvetica, Swiss 721, is used in Andorra and the Dominican Republic (specifically the black, condensed version).
  - Helvetica is used in Israel for English texts or Latin transliterations under the name Triumvirat.
  - Helvetica Light is used for Basque language place names in the French Basque Country.
  - Some signs in Catalonia use the Helvetica typeface.
- Highway Gothic (Example), also known as FHWA Series, is the primary choice in the United States and most of the MUTCD-influenced countries, as well as Argentina (under the name Roadgeek 2000), Australia, Brazil, Canada, Chile, Colombia, Ecuador, Indonesia, Malaysia, Mexico, New Zealand, Peru, the Philippines, SICA countries and Uruguay. It was formerly used in Spain for motorway signs (under the name Autopista).
  - China, Macau, Saudi Arabia, Taiwan and Thailand use Highway Gothic for Latin texts.
  - RWS (formerly ANWB), is the typeface used in the Netherlands, derived from Highway Gothic.
  - Two derivations of Highway Gothic are used in Turkey—O-Serisi (for motorways) and E-Serisi (for other roads).
- Hiragino and Vialog (Example/例) are both used in Japan.
- Medina Lt Bold is used for Arabic text in Israel.
- Milan Bold is used for the Devanagari text in Nepal. The current digitization of this font follows the "Preeti" encoding and is not Unicode-compliant.
- Road UA (Example/Приклад) is used in Ukraine (using GOST 10807-78 until 2021).
- Ruta CL (Example/Ejemplo) is used in Chile, formerly used Highway Gothic.
- Sulekha TE Bold is used for Bengali text in Bangladesh. The current digitization of Sulekha follows the Bijoy system and is not Unicode-compliant.
- SNV (Example) is used in Belgium, Bulgaria, Luxembourg, Romania, all countries of the former Yugoslavia. It was used in Switzerland until 2003.
- Tamrurim, also known as Touring (דוגמא), is used in Israel for Hebrew text. For urban roads, Narkiss Tam is used instead.
- Tern (Example) is used in Austria and Slovakia.
- Tipografía México (Example/Ejemplo) is used in Mexico. This replaced the former typeface, based on Highway Gothic, which was used at the federal level until 2023.
- Traditional Arabic is used in Tunisia for Arabic text.
- Traffic is the typeface used for Persian text in Iran.
- Trafikkalfabetet (Example) is used in Norway.
- Transport (Example) is used in the United Kingdom, as well as in Ireland, Iceland, Greece (on non-motorway signs), Anglophone Africa, Anglophone Caribbean (Lesser Antilles), Malta, New Zealand, and Portugal.
  - An oblique variant (Example/Sampla) is used in Ireland for Irish text.
  - Additionally, the United Kingdom and Ireland have a separate typeface called Motorway to display route numbers on motorway signs. This font is also used for the numerals of route numbers as well as exit numbers in Portugal.
  - Bangladesh, Egypt, Ethiopia, Hong Kong, India, Iran, Kuwait, Lebanon, Nepal, Qatar, Saudi Arabia, the United Arab Emirates and Yemen use Transport for English texts or Latin transliterations.
  - Alfabeto Normale is a bolder variant of Transport used in Albania, Burundi, Italy, Lebanon, San Marino, Sierra Leone, the Vatican City and some parts of the Kurdistan Region of Iraq. A condensed version—Alfabeto Stretto—is also used.
    - LLM Lettering is used for expressways in Malaysia, derived from Alfabeto Normale.
  - Carretera Convencional, also known as CCRIGE, is a bolder variant of Transport used in Spain, Equatorial Guinea, Djibouti.
  - Dansk Vejtavleskrift is a variant of Transport used in Denmark. It uses unique numerals as well as having wider letter spacing.
- Tratex (Example) is used in Sweden and Åland.
- Universal Grotesk (Example) was used in Czechoslovakia and continued to be used in Slovakia until 2014.
- Finland does not use a defined typeface. It is regulated by the Finnish Transport and Communications Agency.
- Poland does not use a defined typeface, though digitized versions have been made.
- Singapore does not use a defined typeface—it is instead defined letter-by-letter by the Land Transport Authority. It is also used in Brunei.
- Thailand does not use a defined typeface for Thai text—it is instead defined letter-by-letter by the Department of Highways. Digitisations have been created under the name Thang Luang.
  - In the city of Bangkok, another typeface is used, supplied by the Bangkok Metropolitan Administration. It notably makes use of open "heads" for letters.

The rest of the world usually employs Transport, Highway Gothic or Arial for the Latin text, and a sans-serif font for the non-Latin text which may or may not have a specific name. Libya has the peculiarity of sign-posting in Arabic only and employing no Latin text.

Some countries may prefer to write cities and town names in all-uppercase (among which: Albania, Bangladesh, Burundi, Czechia, China, Finland, France and former colonies, Ireland (for place names in English), Italy, Luxembourg, Portugal, Mexico (federal-level prior to 2023), North Korea, Sierra Leone, Spain, Sweden, all of the former Soviet Union except for Ukraine), others instead prefer to use normal mixed case names.
