= Kamel Mrowa =

Lebanese journalist and publisher (1915–1966)

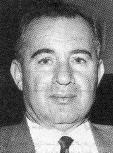
- Born: 1915; Zrarieh, Ottoman Empire
- Died: 16 May 1966 (aged 50–51); Beirut, Lebanon
- Occupations: Publisher and journalist
- Known for: Founder, Al-Hayat and The Daily Star
- Spouse: Salma El-Bissar
- Relatives: Peter Palumbo, Baron Palumbo (son-in-law)

Kamel Mrowa (Arabic: كامل مروّه, also spelled Mroue or Mroueh, 1915 – 16 May 1966) was a Lebanese publisher, journalist, writer and ideologue. He was the founder of the Lebanese Arabic daily Al-Hayat (Arabic الحياة, meaning "Life") in 1946, the Lebanese English-language newspaper, The Daily Star in 1952 and the French language Beyrouth Matin in 1959. His politics opposed military dictatorships which came to rule the Arab world in the 1950s and 1960s. He was killed by a gunman while checking the final proofs of the next day's issue of his paper.

== Biography ==
Mrowa was born in Zrarieh, in southern Lebanon to Jamil Mrowa, a prominent Lebanese expatriate to Mexico and originating from the Arab Hamdan family. His family established trade in South Lebanon and did not return to Mexico. His father died in 1925 when Kamel was 11 years old. Kamel Mrowa studied in the Makassed elementary school in Saida, and then in the American Arts School in Saida for his secondary education. While in school, he became editor in-chief of the art school's publication Thamarat al Founoun (Arabic: ثمرة الفنون), where he published his first writings. After graduation he worked for a while as an instructor at College Ameliyyah, a prominent educational institution teaching history and geography.

After a year, he joined in 1933 the Lebanese daily An Nida (Arabic: النداء). While working for the paper his translation of Adolf Hitler's book Mein Kampf was serialized in the paper. In 1935 he moved to another Lebanese daily An-Nahar (Arabic: النهار). Rashid Beydoun, the president of the Ameliyyah Association, sent him as an envoy to Africa for collecting donations for the association from wealthy Lebanese expatriates particularly in West Africa. He kept diaries and journals to them as "Maqalat wa yawmiyat" (Arabic: مقالات و يوميّات, meaning "Articles and Daily Journals") in An Nahar and in separate books Nahnou fi Afriqya ("We, in Africa"), Setta fi Tayyara (Arabic: ستّة في طيّارة, meaning "Six in an airplane"). He also filed dispatches to international newspapers and periodicals.

In 1940, returning to Beirut, he co-published with Fouad Hobeiche the periodical Al Musawwara ("The Illustrated"), chronicling World War II events in articles and photos, an innovation in the Lebanese press.

In 1946, he established the Lebanese Arabic daily Al-Hayat. The first issue was published on 28 January 1946. Gebran Tueni, his former boss in An Nahar provided him a room as head office to publish his new paper. In 1951, he moved to new offices in Beirut. "Al-Hayat" became one of the most influential newspapers of its time, in the Arab world. In 1952, he published from the same place a second daily newspaper, the Lebanese English-language newspaper, The Daily Star.

He had five children with his wife Salma al Bissar: Hayat, Jamil, Lina, Karim and Malek. His daughter Hayat married the British property developer and patron of the arts Peter Palumbo, Baron Palumbo.

=== Contribution to Arabic typography ===
In 1954, Mrowa approached the British company Linotype & Machinery Ltd. (L&M) with the proposal to develop a new Arabic typeface. Inspired by the reduced number of letter shapes found on Arabic typewriters, Mrowa suggested to adopt similar principles for professional typesetting. Walter Tracy, at the time L&M's typographical adviser, reviewed Mrowa's proposal and agreed to pursue it despite concerns of the mother company Mergenthaler Linotype. In the ensuing collaboration, Mrowa, Al-Hayat's lettering artist Nabih Jaroudi, and L&M staff under the guidance of Walter Tracy developed a new Arabic printing type.

Its key innovation was the reduction in the number of characters used to represent the joining forms of the Arabic script. Because of this simplification, Arabic could be composed with a standard Linotype machine with a single 90-channel magazine, greatly increasing the speed of composition. First publicly announced in 1959 with the name Mrowa-Linotype Simplified Arabic, it soon became one of the most widely used typefaces for Arabic newspaper composition.

== Death ==
On 16 May 1966, Kamel Mrowa was assassinated when a lone gunman, Adnan Chaker Sultani, walked into the Beirut office of Al-Hayat and shot Mrowa while he was checking the final proofs of the next day's issue. The motive was never conclusively established, but investigators eventually linked the killing to the Independent Nasserite Movement or INM (Leader: Ibrahim Kulaylat, commonly known as "Al-Murabitoun" in Arabic "المرابطون") who considered Mrowa's vocal criticism of the Arab nationalist movement (then led by Egyptian President Gamal Abdel Nasser) as a threat. Sultani was arrested, tried and convicted of the murder and sentenced to 20-years imprisonment.

=== Aftermath ===
Upon his death, his widow Salma El-Bissar took over the two newspapers, running them until the outbreak of the Lebanese Civil War forced the suspension of publications.

In 1988, Mrowa's son Jamil reestablished Al-Hayat with his partner Adel Bishtawi, and sold it the same year to Saudi Prince Khalid bin Sultan. Al-Hayat continued publication from its headquarters in London, again a prominent pan-Arab daily newspaper. The Daily Star continued publication as Lebanon's most prominent English daily newspaper until 2020.
