= Simplified Arabic =

Simplified Arabic or Yakout
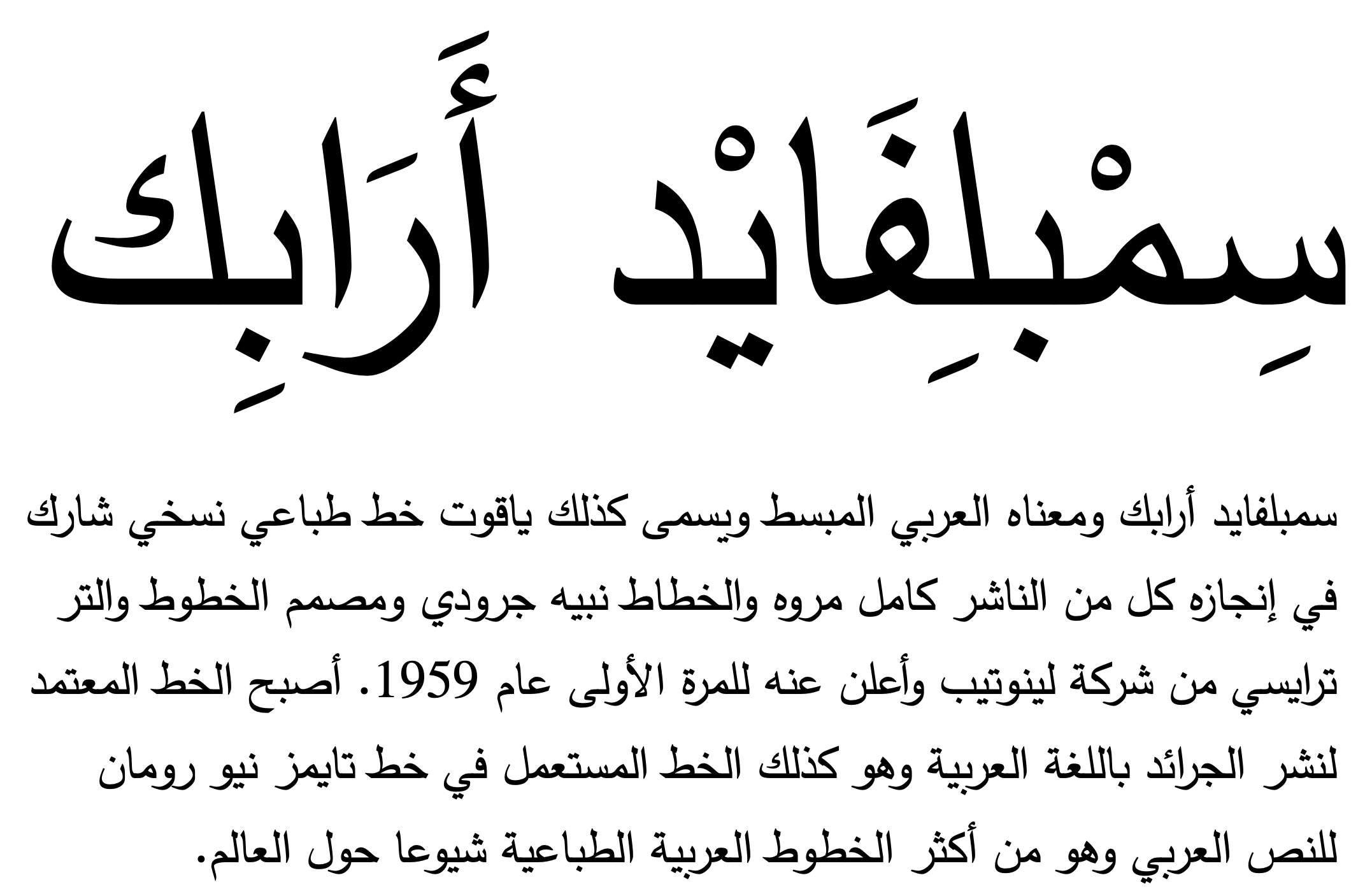
- Designers: Kamel Mrowa; Nabih Jaroudi; Walter Tracy
- Foundry: Linotype & Machinery Ltd.

Simplified Arabic (called Yakout since 1967) is a simplified Arabic font that allowed Arabic text to be composed using a Linotype machine. It was first announced in 1959 as Mrowa-Linotype Simplified Arabic. The font was developed by the founder of the Lebanese daily newspaper Al-Hayat Kamel Mrowa, its lettering artist Nabih Jaroudi, and Linotype & Machinery Ltd. staff under the guidance of Walter Tracy. It became the Arabic supplement for the typefaces Times New Roman and Arial, which were then included as TrueType fonts for the core fonts for the Web World Wide Web.

The Simplified Arabic font reduced the number of characters necessary to compose Arabic, allowing it to fit into the Linotype machine's single 90-channel magazine. The font became one of the most widely used typefaces for composing Arabic newspapers.

== History ==
In 1954, Kamel Mrowa contacted the British company Linotype & Machinery Ltd. (L&M), formed by the merger of the Linotype Company Limited (registered in 1889) and the Machinery Trust Limited (registered in 1893), with the idea of developing a new, simplified Arabic typeface. His idea took inspiration from Arabic typewriters, which, by overlapping the letters, condensed the four forms of each letter Arabic letter (isolated, initial, medial, and final) into two (isolated-final and initial-medial(Some letters like Ayn are an exception)).

Kamel Mrowa, the lettering artist of Al-Hayat Nabih Jaroudi, and staff of Linotype & Machinery Ltd. under the leadership and guidance of Walter Tracy collaborated on the project.

Intertype's Abridged Arabic typeface, released 1960-1961, was adapted from Simplified Arabic.

Hrant Gabeyah suggested the name Yakout, after the 13th century calligrapher Yaqut al-Musta'simi.

It was one of the first Arabic fonts to be converted to the PostScript file format.

In the 1970s and 80s, Compugraphic plagiarized Simplified Arabic as well as Traditional Arabic; they had both become ubiquitous. When the Belgian Agfa-Gevaert Corporation came to control Compugraphics, it licensed the font it plagiarized to Microsoft for use in Microsoft Windows. Simplified Arabic, in barely modified forms, was then used as the Arabic complement for both Times New Roman and Arial, which were then included as TrueType fonts for the core fonts for the Web World Wide Web.

== See also ==
- Traditional Arabic
- ASV Codar
