= Institute for Studies and Research on Arabization =

The Institute for Studies and Research on Arabization (Arabic: معهد الدراسات والأبحاث للتعريب, French: l’Institut d’études et de recherches pour l’arabisation or IERA) is an institute dedicated to Arabization in Rabat, Morocco created by decree January 14, 1960.

== History ==
In 1960, the Moroccan government created the Institute for Studies and Research on Arabization at Mohammed V University for the development and modernization of Arabic, with Lakhdar Ghazal as its director. Its first congress was held in 1961 in Rabat. In 1967, the Arab League entrusted the Institute for Studies and Research on Arabization with coordinating efforts to enrich Arabic with developing scientific terminologies and to standardize the Arabization of such concepts in the Arab region.

In 1975, an agreement with Morocco's Ministry of Education and UNESCO provided funding for Lakhdar Ghazal's ASV Codar typographic project.

The administration of Prime Minister Saadeddine Othmani made the Institute part of the Mohammed V University in 2020. This move came after controversy arose from an attempt to place it along with the Royal Institute of Amazigh Culture (IRCAM) under the National Council of Moroccan Languages and Cultures.
