= Walter Tracy =

English typographer and writer (1914–1995)

Walter Valentine Tracy
- Born: 14 February 1914; Islington, London, England
- Died: 28 April 1995 (aged 81)
- Occupations: type designer, typographer, writer

Walter Valentine Tracy RDI (14 February 1914 – 28 April 1995) was an English type designer, typographer and writer.

== Biography ==
Walter Tracy was born in Islington, London and attended Shoreditch Secondary school. At the age of fourteen he was apprenticed to the large printing firm William Clowes as a compositor. When he had completed his apprenticeship, Tracy went to work in the typographic studio of The Baynard Press, a printing house. From 1938 to 1946, Tracy had been rejected by the army's medical examination, he worked in an advertising agency as a print buyer.

From 1947 Tracy began to work part-time for the British Linotype & Machinery Ltd. (L&M) company, a subsidiary of Mergenthaler Linotype. The following year he was hired as a full-time employee by L&M, where he was going to spend the following 30 years. There he became involved with designing typefaces for newspapers, and classified advertising. His typeface Jubilee, designed to be more robust than Stanley Morison's 1931 font Times New Roman, was adopted by a number of newspapers, and his Telegraph Modern was used by the Daily Telegraph from 1967.

From the mid-1950s Tracy was also responsible for a range of influential Arabic type developments, among them the making of the Mrowa-Linotype Simplified Arabic type in collaboration with Kamel Mrowa and Nabih Jaroudi. In 1967 Tracy supervised a team steered by L&M's representative Hrant Gabeyan that developed the first computer for automated Arabic character selection and justification. The resulting system was developed in collaboration with the Compugraphic Corporation, and was first installed at the Egyptian daily Al-Ahram. It became an influential model for later systems such as the phonetic keyboard for Indian scripts developed by Linotype-Paul Ltd.

In 1972 Tracy was asked by The Times to design a replacement for Times New Roman. The resulting type was named Times Europa, and was adopted by The Times in late 1972. In 1973 he was elected a Royal Designer for Industry. Tracy retired in 1977 but remained active, designing a range of Arabic typefaces for Linotype, Letraset and Bitstream. In the same period he also designed a Hebrew font, under a pseudonym.

Whilst some of his papers are held at the Type Museum, London, his correspondence files, documenting the development of numerous important typefaces, are held at the Department of Typography & Graphic Communication, University of Reading.

Walter was married to Frances Tracy for many years. They latterly lived at "Cedar Court" in Finchley, London, a Grade II listed 1920s building. He died on 28 April 1995.

== Typefaces ==
- Jubilee (1953)
- Adsans (1959)
- Maximus (1967)
- Telegraph Modern (1969)
- Times Europa (1972)
- Telegraph Newface Bold (with Shelley Winter, 1979)
- Qadi (Linotype) (1979)
- Kufic (Letraset) (1980)
- Oasis (1985)
- Sharif (Bitstream) (1989)
- Malik (Bitstream) (1988)
- Medina (Bitstream) (1989)

== Bibliography ==
- Nemeth, Titus Arabic Type-Making in the Machine Age. The influence of Technology on the Form of Arabic Type 1908–1993, Leiden and Boston: Brill, 2017
- Ross, Fiona Non-Latin Type Design at Linotype paper presented at the First annual Friends of St Bride conference, 24 & 25 September 2002, St Bride Library, London
- Tracy, Walter Letters of Credit, a View of Type Design, London 1986
- Tracy, Walter The Typographic Scene London 1988
- Tracy, Walter on Lanston Monotype's Series 54 in Bulletin 39 of the Printing Historical Society Summer 1995
- Tracy, Walter Composing Room Days (and after) in Bulletin 40 of the Printing Historical Society Winter 1995/96 which includes a memorial Editorial with contributions by two of his colleagues Shelley Winter & Lesley Sewell.
