= ASV Codar =

Arabic typeface

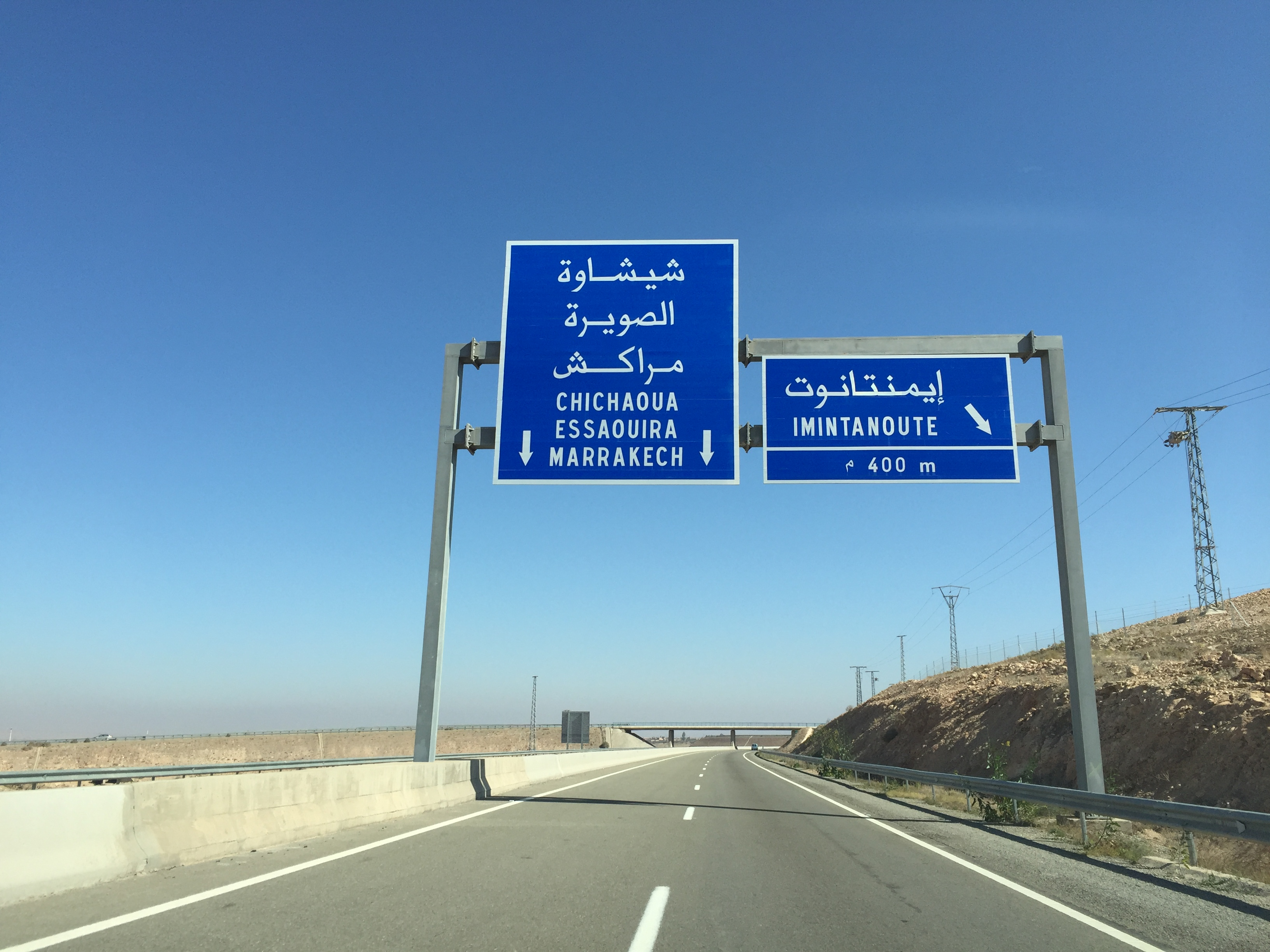
ASV Codar typeface in use on Moroccan highway signs

ASV Codar (from Arabe Standard Voyellé - Codage Arabe) is an Arabic typeface developed by Ahmed Lakhdar Ghazal. It was designed as a simplified typeface, with one vowels as their own characters. ASV Codar was first released in two versions: a "pure" version with only 84 characters, and a "total" version with 23 additional characters. The typeface is used for road signs in Morocco.

== History ==
Ahmed Lakhdar Ghazal first filed for a patent for his project in France in 1954. He submitted his idea to the Academy of the Arabic Language in Cairo in 1958, but it was rejected. ASV Codar was first released in two versions: a "pure" version with only 84 characters, and a "total" version with 23 additional characters.

In 1958, when Lakhdar Ghazal's was serving as both general secretary of Morocco's National Commission for UNESCO and head of the Fundamental Education section of the Moroccan Ministry of Education, ASV Codar gained the support of the Moroccan government, which employed it in its first national campaign against illiteracy.

In 1960, the Moroccan government created the Institute for Studies and Research on Arabization at Mohammed V University for the development and modernization of Arabic, with Lakhdar Ghazal as its director. In 1975, an agreement with Morocco's Ministry of Education and UNESCO provided funding for Lakhdar Ghazal's project.

== See also ==
- Simplified Arabic
- Traditional Arabic
