= Traditional Arabic =

Arabic naskh-based typeface

Traditional Arabic or Series 589
- Category: naskh
- Foundry: Monotype
- Date created: 1956

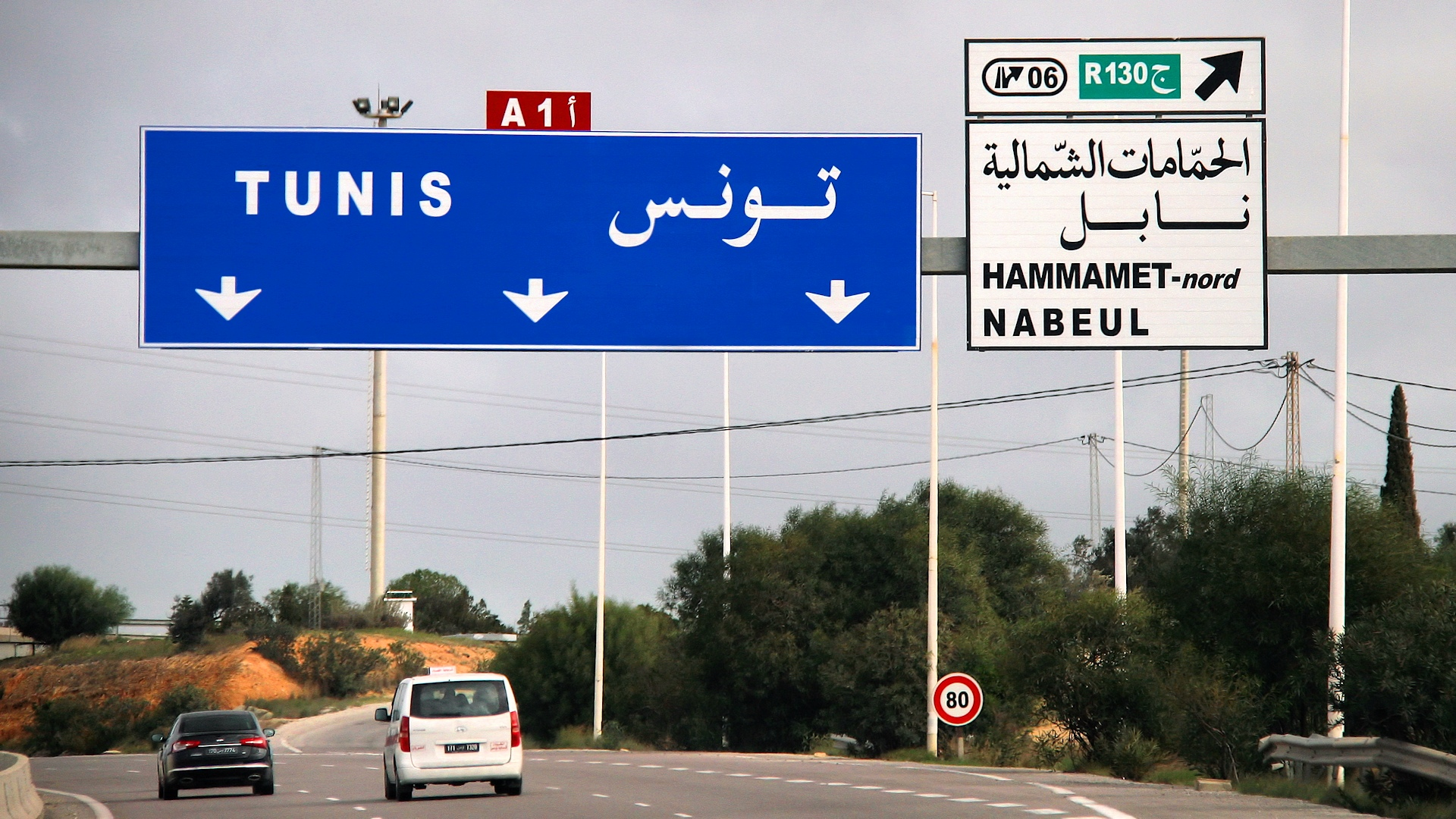
Traditional Arabic (Bold) typeface in use on Tunisian traffic signs

Traditional Arabic is an Arabic naskh-based typeface first developed by Monotype as Series 589 in the spring of 1956. It featured a system of interlocking sorts to allow for the diacritics to properly display over the letters they modify.

Whereas Linotype's typeface Simplified Arabic or Yakout had become the standard for newspapers, the Traditional Arabic typeface became the preferred for quality book printing.

In the 1970s and 1980s, Compugraphic plagiarized Traditional Arabic as well as Simplified Arabic; they had both become ubiquitous. When the Belgian Agfa-Gevaert Corporation came to control Compugraphics, it licensed the fonts it plagiarized to Microsoft for use in Microsoft Windows.

== See also ==
- Simplified Arabic
- ASV Codar
