= Road signs in Portugal =

Road signs located in Ponta Delgada.

Road signs in Portugal are governed by the Road Signage Regulation (Portuguese: Regulamento de Sinalização do Trânsito) of the Portuguese Republic. The country is an original signatory to the Vienna Convention on Road Signs and Signals.

They are installed along the road on the right side of the road and are subdivided into warning signs (group A), regulatory signs (groups B-D), subdivided into priority, prohibition, obligation and specific prescription signs, indication signs (groups H-T), subdivided into information signs, pre-signalling, direction, confirmation, location identification, supplementary signs, additional signs and temporary signs (groups AT and TC). The typefaces used on road signs are derived from the British Transport and Motorway typefaces.

== Gallery ==
Illustrated below are the road signs currently in use as codified by the Road Signage Regulation of 1998 and its subsequent updates.

=== Warning signs ===
A1a - (Dangerous) Curve to the right

A1b - (Dangerous) Curve to the left

A1c - Double curve, first to right

A1d - Double curve, first to left

A2a - Bump

A2b - Dip

A2c - Uneven road

A3a - Steep hill downwards (Dangerous descent)

A3b - Steep climb (Dangerous climb)

A4a - Road narrows on both sides

A4b - Road narrows on left

A4c - Road narrows on right

A5 - Slippery road

A6 - Gravel projection (Loose chippings)

A7a - Low shoulder on right

A7b - Dangerous shoulder on left

A8 - Unprotected quayside or precipice ahead

A9 - Falling rocks

A10 - Opening or swing bridge

A11 - Ice or snow

A12 - Sidewinds

A13 - Insufficient visibility

A14 - Children

A15 - Elderly people crossing

A16a - Pedestrian crossing

A16b - Pedestrians

A17a - Cyclist crossing

A17 - Cyclists

A18 - Equestrians

A19a - Animals (usually, domestic livestock)

A19b - Wild animals

A19c - Iberian lynx crossing

A19d - Amphibian crossing

A20 - Tunnel

A21 - Airfield runway (/Low-flying aircraft)

A22 - Traffic signals ahead

A23 - Roadworks

A24 - Crossroad without priority

A25 - Two-way traffic

A26 - Level crossing with gates or barriers

A27 - Level crossing without gates or barriers

A28 - Intersection with rail-based transport (Tramway)

A29 - Other dangers

A30 - Traffic queues likely

A31 - Road obstruction (Accident)

A32a - Single crossbuck - Level crossing without gates or barriers

A32b - Double crossbuck - Level crossing without gates or barriers with two or more lines

=== Priority signs ===
B1 - Give way

B2 - Stop

B3 - Priority road

B4 - End of priority road

B5 - Priority for oncoming traffic

B6 - Priority over oncoming traffic

B7 - Roundabout ahead

B8 - Crossroad with priority

B9a - Side road with priority on left

B9b - Side road with priority on right

B9c - Merging traffic on left

B9d - Merging traffic on right

=== Prohibition signs ===
C1 - No entry

C2 - No vehicles both directions

C3a - No motor vehicles

C3b - No dangerous goods

C3c - No lorries/trucks

C3d - No lorries/trucks over 3.5 tonnes

C3e - No motorcycles or mopeds

C3f - No mopeds

C3g - No cycles or mopeds

C3h - No agricultural vehicles

C3i - No animal-drawn vehicles

C3j - No hand-carts

C3l - No pedestrians

C3m - No equestrians

C3n - No trailers

C3o - No trailers over 2 tons

C3p - No vehicles carrying dangerous goods

C3q - No vehicles carrying explosives

C3r - No vehicles carrying polluted water

No buses

C4a - No motor vehicles

C4b - No lorries or trailers

C4c - No motor vehicles or animal-drawn vehicles

C4d - No trucks or animal-drawn vehicles

C4e - No pedestrians, mopeds, animals, or handcarts

C4f - No bicycles, mopeds, and motorcycles

No trucks and buses

C5 - Axle limit

C6 - Weight limit

C7 - Length limit

C8 - Width limit

C9 - Height limit

C10 - Driving vehicles distance

C11a - No right turn

C11b - No left turn

C12 - No U-turn

C13 - Maximum speed limit (km/h)

C14a - No overtaking

C14b - No overtaking by lorries

C14c - No overtaking by motorcycles

C15 - No parking

C16 - No standing or parking

C17 - No hooting

C18 - Customs check

C19 - Toll (listed as "Other compulsory stops")

C20a - National speed limit

C20b - End of maximum speed limit

C20c - End of overtaking prohibition

C20d - End of overtaking by lorries prohibition

C20e - End of no overtaking by motorcycles

C21 - End of no parking

C22 - End of hooting prohibition

=== Mandatory signs ===
D1a - Turn right

D1b - Turn left

D1c - Straight ahead

D1d - Turn left ahead

D1e - Turn right ahead

D2a - Straight ahead or turn left

D2b - Straight ahead or turn right

D2c - Turn left or right

D3a - Keep right

D3b - Keep left

D4 - Roundabout

D5a - Trucks only

D5b - Heavy vehicles only

D5c - Motorcycles only

D6 - Buses only

D6a - High-occupancy vehicles only

D7a - Compulsory way for cyclists

D7b - Compulsory way for pedestrians

D7c - Compulsory way for equestrians

D7d - Compulsory way for cattle herds

D7e - Compulsory way for pedestrians and bicycles

D7f - Compulsory way for pedestrians and bicycles (Pedestrians keep right)

D8 - Minimum speed limit (km/h)

D9 - Snow chains on tires

D10 - (Medium) Headlights on

D11a - End of trucks only

D11b - End of heavy vehicles only

D11c - End of motorcycles only

D12a - End of buses only

D12b - End of high-occupancy vehicles only

D13a - End of compulsory way for bicycles

D13b - End of compulsory way for pedestrians

D13c - End of compulsory way for equestrians

D13d - End of compulsory way for cattle herds

D13e - End of compulsory way for pedestrians and bicycles

D13f - End of compulsory way for pedestrians and bicycles

D14 - End of minimum speed limit (km/h)

D15 - End of snow chains on tires

D16 - (Medium) Headlights off

=== Lane selection and direction signs ===
E1 - Destinations over road (IP - road model)

E2 - Exit destinations

E3 - Lane-selection graphic signage, placed on side of the road

F1a - Lane restrictions sign, placed on side of the road

F1b - Lane restrictions sign, placed on side of the road

F1c - Lane restrictions sign, placed on side of the road

F2 - Transit lane reserved for public transport

=== Zone signs ===
G1 - Parking zone

G2a - No parking zone

G2b - No parking zone

G3 - No stopping zone

G4 - Speed limited zone

G5a - No vehicles zone

G5b - No trucks zone

G6 - End of parking zone

G7a - End of parking zone

G8 - End of speed limited zone

G9 - No vehicles zone ends

=== Information signs ===
H1a - Parking

H1b - Parking garage

H2 - Hospital

H3 - One-way traffic

H4 - Dead end

H5 - Snow chains recommended

H6 - Recommended speed

H7 - Pedestrian crossing

H8a - Pedestrian grade-separated crossing (ramp)

H8b - Pedestrian grade-separated crossing (stairs)

H9 - Hospital with urgent medical care

H10 - First aid station

H11 - Repair services

H12 - Public telephone

H13a - Petrol station

H13b - Petrol and gas (GPL) station

H14a - Camping

H14b - Caravan site

H14c - Camping and caravan site

H15 - Emergency telephone

H16a - "Pousada" or Inn

H16b - Hostel ("Albergue")

H16c - Youth hostel

H16d - Rural tourism

H17 - Hotel

H18 - Restaurant

H19 - Café or bar

H20a - Bus stop

H20b - Tram stop

H20c - School bus stop

H21 - Airport

H22 - Information post

H23 - Road information radio

H24 - Motorway (Auto-estrada)

H25 - Road reserved for automobiles and motorcycles

H26 - Emergency escape

H27 - U-turn place

H28 - National speed limits

H29a - EU country border

H29b - EU country border (Spain)

H30 - Route/Lane Practicality

H31a - Number and direction of lanes (adjustable case-by-case) - in the example shown, lane opening

H31b - Number and direction of lanes (adjustable case-by-case) - in the example shown, confluence of lane to the right

H31c - Number and direction of lanes (adjustable case-by-case) - in the example shown, two lanes in each direction

H31b - Number and direction of lanes (adjustable case-by-case) - in the example shown, one lane in each direction

H32 - Lane ends

H33 - Via Verde

H34 - Car Inspection Centre. (Note: The abbreviation "IPO" stands for Inspecção Periódica Obrigatória (Compulsory Periodic Inspection).)

H35 - Tunnel

H36 - End of snow chains recommendation

H37 - End of recommended speed limit

H38 - End of motorway

H39 - End of car and motorcycle-exclusive road

H40 - End of parking area

H41 - End of tunnel

H42 - Average-speed camera

H43 - "Instant" speed camera.

H44a - Road section with electronic tolls

H44b - Road section with electronic tolls, with distance to toll marked

H44c - Directional indication to road section with electronic tolls

H45 - End of road section with electronic tolls

H46 - Residential area or "área de coexistência (Coexistence area) - road section of motor and pedestrian coexistence.

H47 - End of residential area or "área de coexistência (Coexistence area) - road section of motor and pedestrian coexistence.

H48 - Speed reducing bump

H49a - Emergency stop area

H49b - Emergency stop area with telephone present

H50a - Emergency exit - location of closest exit (left variant)

H50b - Emergency exit - location of closest exit (right variant)

H51a and H51b - Emergency exit - location and direction of closest exit

=== Pre-signaling sign ===
I1 - Simplified advanced notice information (for a grade separated intersection, IP-class road model shown)

I2a - Graphic advanced notice for a level intersection (with directions and distance to crossing, IP-class road model shown)

I2b - Graphic advanced notice for a roundabout

I2c - Graphic advanced notice for a level intersection

I2d - Graphic advanced notice for a grade-separated crossing intersection, with distance shown (IP-road model shown)

I2e - Advanced notice, straight on example (IP road model)

I2f - Graphic advanced notice (IP road model)

I3a - Reduced pre-notice sign

I3b - Reduced pre-warning signage for a crossing

I4a - Approach Service station

I4b - Approach to service station exit lane

I5b - Approach to rest area

I5b - Approach to rest area exit lane

I6 - "Advanced notice of itinerary" (Guide to a left turn point) (Note: In the original law annex, erroneously marked I6a, like the following figure)

I7a - Dead-end

I7b - Dead-end

I8 - Children crossing ahead

I9a, I9b and I9c - Level crossing countdown markers

I9d, I9e and I9f - Level crossing countdown markers

=== Direction, confirmation and location signs ===
J1 - Direction at the intersection

J2 - Access direction (here for an aerodrome/airport)

J3a - Urban direction signage (here for a cultural point-of-interest, a castle)

J3b, J3c and J3d - Urban direction signage

L1 - "Direction confirmation sign" (Distances to key towns on road)

N1a - Start of settlement

N1b - Start of settlement variant (here as a World Heritage Site)

N2a - End of settlement

N2b - End of settlement variant (here as a World Heritage Site)

=== Complementary signs ===
O1a - Hectometric demarcation of route - Principal Itinerary (IP)

O1b - Hectometric demarcation of route - Complementary Itinerary (IC)

O1c - Hectometric demarcation of route - remaining road classes (front and profile views)

O1d - Hectometric demarcation of route - municipal road (EM) classes (front and profile views)

O2a - Kilometric demarcation of route - motorways

O2b - Kilometric demarcation of route - Principal Itineraries (IP)

O2c - Kilometric demarcation of route - Complementary Itineraries (IC)

O2d - Kilometric demarcation of route - national road (EN)

O2e - Kilometric demarcation of route - municipal road (EN)

O3a - Miriametric demarcation of route - motorways

O3b - Miriametric demarcation of route - Principal Itineraries (IP)

O3c - Miriametric demarcation of route - Complementary Itineraries (IC)

O3d - Miriametric demarcation of route - national road (EN)

O3e - Miriametric demarcation of route - municipal road (EN)

O4a, O4b and O4c - Distance to exit approximation side-panels (motorway)

O5a - Directional bay for marking divergence points

O5b - Directional bay for marking divergence points

O6a - Directional bay

O6b - Directional bay

O7a and O7b - Positioning markers

(Not present in regulation annexes but commonplace) - Hectometric demarcation of route motorways

=== Additional indication signs ===
Model 1a - Distance

Model 1b - Distance (to a stop sign)

Model 2 - Indication of the duration of a stretch of road or condition

Model 3a - Start or end of regulated area (left)

Model 3b - Start or end of regulated area (ahead)

Model 3c - Start or end of regulated area (right)

Model 3d - Start or end of regulated area

Model 4a - Regulated extension. Condition exists only in the allotted space.

Model 4b - Regulated extension. Condition exists only in the allotted space.

Model 5 - Regulated extension. Condition exists only in the allotted space.

Model 6a - Continuation of regulated extension

Model 6b - Continuation of regulated extension.

Model 7a - Period in effect. This version indicates the days in which the rule is applicable.

Model 7b - Period in effect. This variant indicates a specific day applicable

Model 7c - Period in effect. This variant indicates time span.

Model 7d - Period in effect. This variant indicates days and times.

Model 8 - Time duration. The example shown imposes usage of at least 30 minutes.

Model 9 - Weight limit

Model 10a - Exception to imposed rule

Model 10b - Exception to imposed rule

Model 12a - Perpendicular parking. Used in conjunction with sign H1.

Model 12b - Angled parking. Used in conjunction with sign H1.

Model 12c - Parking on kerb. Used in conjunction with sign H1.

Model 12d - Parking on pavement. Used in conjunction with sign H1.

Model 12e - Parking on kerb perpendicular to the road. Used in conjunction with sign H1.

Model 12f - Parking on pavement, perpendicular to the road. Used in conjunction with sign H1.

Model 13a - Right-of-way priority diagram direction for a junction. Used in conjunction with sign B3.

Model 13b - Right-of-way priority diagram direction for a crossing. Used in conjunction with sign B3.

Model 14: Varied information. Here, it warns of maneuvering vehicles at a certain distance.

Model 15a - Heavy rain. Typically used in conjunction with signs A5 and A29.

Model 15b - Snowy or icy conditions. Typically used in conjunction with signs A5 and A29.

Model 16 - Snowplough. Typically used in conjuction with sign A29.

Model 19a - Restriction of use. In this case, the area may only be used for loading and unloading.

Model 20 - Paid parking.

=== Touristic-cultural signage (list) ===
The following figures are present in Table XXXVII annexed to the traffic signals regulation of 1998:

- T1 - Regional sign
- T2 - Heritage (used on motorways, prior to appropriate exits. Shown is the example for the city of Tomar, showing the Manueline Window of the Convent of Christ)
- T3 - Natural heritage (in the example, a sign for the River Zêzere)
- T4a - Touristic circuit identification (the example shown is for a "Circuit of Castles")
- T4b - Touristic circuit direction
- T5a - Touristic route identification (the example shown is for a "Route of the Megalithic")
- T5b - Touristic route direction
- T6 - Touristic signage for a settlement (typically used on municipal borders)

=== Indication signage (list) ===
The following figures are present in Table XXXIX annexed to the traffic signals regulation of 1998 and are mostly used around unforeseen route changes and/or construction:

- ST1a - Number of lanes and direction (one way)
- ST1b - Number of lanes and direction (two lanes, one direction)
- ST1c - Number of lanes and direction (one lane in each direction)
- ST1d - Number of lanes and direction (two lanes with another lane in the opposite direction)
- ST2 - Supression of road lane, with distance shown
- ST3 - Supression of road shoulder, with distance shown
- ST4 - Lane diversion, with distance shown
- ST5 - Lane diversion into opposing direction
- ST6 - Narrowing of road lane
- ST7 - Advanced notice of detour
- ST8a - Route detour with the word "Desvio" (detour) and destination
- ST8b - Route detour variant with two destinations instead of the "detour" information
- ST9 - End of detour
- ST10 - Alternating circulation (due to road work)
- ST11 - "Traffic subject to delay" (with space for the specific road section)
- ST12 - Emergency telephone
- ST13 - Accident
- ST14 - End of road work

=== Complementary devices (list) ===
At the end of the annexes in Table XL of the regulations, several temporary or remote devices are codified:

- ET1 - Signalling rackets
- ET2 - Directional bays
- ET3 - Positioning bay
- ET4 - Alignment marker
- ET5 - Positioning markers
- ET6 - Cones (two variants)
- ET7 - Clearance markers
- ET8 - Set of sequential wireless markers
- ET9 - Set of wired sequential markers
- ET10 - Movable plastic profile
- ET11 - "Robot" (Moving figure with signal)
- ET12 - Marker trailer
- ET13 - Luminous arrow

== Pictograms ==
The first of the illustrated annexes of the regulations set the several groupings of pictograms for ease of circulation on the road, in Table XXI. A few of the approved pictograms are similar in design to those used in Spain and other countries in the Mediterranean area, albeit sometimes separated with different lines or weight/thickness:

=== I - User support ===
==== Emergency ====
The following are to be inserted against blue background signage:

- 1.1 - Hospital
- 1.2 - Hospital with emergency services
- 1.3 - First-aid post
- 1.4 - Pharmacy
- 1.5 - Fire station
- 1.6 - GNR - national guard post
- 1.7 - PSP - police station
- 1.8 - Car garage
- 1.9 - Petrol station with GPL pumps
- 1.10 - Petrol station
- 1.11 - Telephone

==== Other indications ====
The following are to be inserted against white background signage:

- 2.1 - Car park
- 2.1A - Parking garage
- 2.2 - Church/sanctuary
- 2.3 - Cemetery
- 2.4 - Market (although typically used for commercial areas in general)
- 2.5 - School
- 2.6 - Post office
- 2.7 - Town/city centre
- 2.8 - Pedestrian area
- 2.9 - Neighbourhood (bairro)
- 2.10 - Metro (Note: Modelled after the Lisbon Metro logo "M" in existence in 1998 when the original regulation was approved.)
- 2.11 - Railway station
- 2.12 - Bus station
- 2.13 - Taxis
- 2.14 - Car-rental
- 2.15 - "Ferry-boat"
- 2.16 - Boarding quay
- 2.17 - Port
- 2.18 - Airport or aerodrome
- 2.19 - Heliport
- 2.20 - Municipality
- 2.21 - Motorway
- 2.22 - Disabled
- 2.23 - Pedestrian grade-separated crossing (ramp)
- 2.24 - Pedestrian grade-separated crossing (stairs)
- 2.25 - Lavatories (WC variant)
- 2.25A - Lavatories (figures variant)
- 2.26 - Car inspection centre
- 2.27 - Road reserved to cars and motorcycles
- 2.28 - Fountain

=== II - Touristic indications ===
The following are to be inserted against a blue background:

- 1 - Caravan and camping park
- 2 - Camping park
- 3 - Caravan park
- 4 - "Pousada" or inn
- 5 - Hostel ("Albergue")
- 6 - Youth hostel
- 7 - Hotel/Motel/Residential
- 8 - Information post/booth
- 9 - Restaurant
- 10 - Bar
- 11 - Zoo
- 12 - Rural tourism (typically related to accommodation)
- 13 - Thermal baths/springs
- 14 - Aquarium
- 15 - Local craftwork
- 16 - Bullring
- 17 - Private accommodation
- 18 - Marina
- 19 - Cape or promonotory (depicting a lighthouse)
- 20 - Casino
- 21 - Exhibition centre/park

=== III - Geographical and ecological indications ===
The following are to be inserted against a brown background:

- 1 - River/lake/reservoir
- 2 - Mountain/mountain range ("serra")
- 3 - Caves
- 4 - Park or garden
- 5 - Beach
- 6 - Pinewood
- 7 - Picnic area
- 8 - Pedestrian routes/trails
- 9 - Belvederes or viewpoints
- 10 - Agricultural area
- 11 - Vinicultural area
- 12 - Protected area, natural park or nature reserve
- 13 - National park (or forest (Note: Also used by some forests in the country, namely the Monsanto Forest Park in Lisbon in its A5 exit.))

=== IV - Cultural indications ===
The following are also to be used against a brown background:

- 1 - Monument, (palace) or castle
- 2 - Museum
- 3 - Library
- 4 - Ruins
- 5 - Pre-historic monument
- 6 - Theatre
- 7 - UNESCO World Heritage Site
- 8 - Preserved village
- 9 - Pillory or cross
- 10 - Bridge
- 11 - "Solar" (noble manor house)
- 12 - "Aldeia Histórica de Portugal", historic village network

=== V - Sporting indications ===
The following are also to be used against an orange background. Some, as well as the overall language in representing the sports, are based on the 1972 Munich Olympic Games' pictograms, designed by the team led by Otl Aicher:

- 1 - Sailing
- 2 - Stadium
- 3 - Hippodrome (horse track)
- 4 - Golf course
- 5 - Autodrome (racetrack)
- 6 - Tennis
- 7 - Swimming pool
- 8 - Sport fishing
- 9 - Sporting centre/complex
- 10 - Shooting range
- 11 - Ski
- 12 - Waterpark
- 13 - "Kartódromo" - kart track
- 14 - Equestrian sports centre
- 15 - Rowing
- 16 - Mountaneering
- 17 - Windsurfing
- 18 - (Sport) hunting
- 19 - Powerboating
- 20 - Canoeing
- 21 - Athletics

=== VI - Industrial indications ===
These pictograms are meant to be used against a grey background.

- 1 - Factory or industrial zone
- 2 - Fishing industry
- 3 - "TIR" terminal - truck terminal (TIR standing for Transporte Internacional Rodoviário, International Road Transport)
- 4 - National stud farm

== Historic signs ==
=== 1926 road signs ===
Uneven road

Series of bends

Crossroad

Level crossing with barriers

Level crossing without barriers

Danger

=== 1935 road signs ===
Uneven road

Series of bends

Crossroad

Level crossing with barriers

Level crossing without barriers

Danger

Danger

Yield

No vehicles

No entry

No motor vehicles with more than three wheels

No motorcycles

No motor vehicles

Weight limit

Speed limit

No stopping

No parking

No overtaking

No honking

Customs

Mandatory direction

Parking

Caution

First aid

=== 1954 road signs ===
==== Warning signs ====
Uneven road

Series of bends

Right curve

Left curve

Double right curve

Double left curve

Crossroad

Railway crossing with gates

Railway crossing without gates

Dangerous hill

Road narrows

Opening bridge

Roadworks

Slippery road

Pedestrian crossing

Animals

Children

Crossroad with priority

Danger

Yield

==== Prohibitory signs ====
No vehicles

No entry

No right turn

No left turn

No overtaking

No motor vehicles

No motor vehicles with more than three wheels

No motorcycles

No cycles

No handcarts

No trucks

Width limit

Height limit

Weight limit

Axle load limit

No honking

Speed limit

End of speed limit

Stop

Stop - customs

Stop - Toll

No parking

No stopping

==== Mandatory signs ====
Proceed straight

Turn right

Turn left

Proceed straight or right

Proceed straight or left

Bicycle path

Bridle path

==== Information signs ====
Parking

Hospital

First aid

Repair service

Public telephone

Filling station

=== 1959 road signs ===
==== Warning signs ====
Uneven road

Right curve

Left curve

Double right curve

Double left curve

Crossroad

Railway crossing with gates

Railway crossing without gates

Dangerous hill

Road narrows

Opening bridge

Roadworks

Slippery road

Pedestrian crossing

Children

Domesticated animals

Wild animals

Crossroad with priority

Two-way traffic

Danger

Yield

Countdown beacon

Countdown beacon

Countdown beacon

Countdown beacon

==== Prohibitory signs ====
No vehicles

No entry

No right turn

No left turn

No overtaking

End of no overtaking

No overtaking for trucks

End of no overtaking for trucks

No motor vehicles with more than three wheels

No motorcycles

No motor vehicles

No trucks

No cycles

No handcarts

Width limit

Height limit

Weight limit

Axle load limit

Maximum speed limit

End of maximum speed limit

Stop

Stop - customs

Stop - Toll

No stopping

No parking

No honking

No honking ends

Give way to oncoming traffic

==== Mandatory signs ====
Proceed straight

Turn right

Turn left

Proceed straight or right

Proceed straight or left

Roundabout

Bicycle path

Bridle path

Minimum speed limit

==== Information signs ====
Parking

Hospital

First aid

Repair service

Public telephone

Filling station

Camping

Priority over oncoming traffic

Priority road

Priority road ends

== Influences ==
- The design of road signs in Angola is largely similar to that used in Portugal, although they are transitioning to the SADC design.
- Road signs in Macau are predominantly based on the pre-1994 Portuguese signage design.
