= Road signs in Laos =

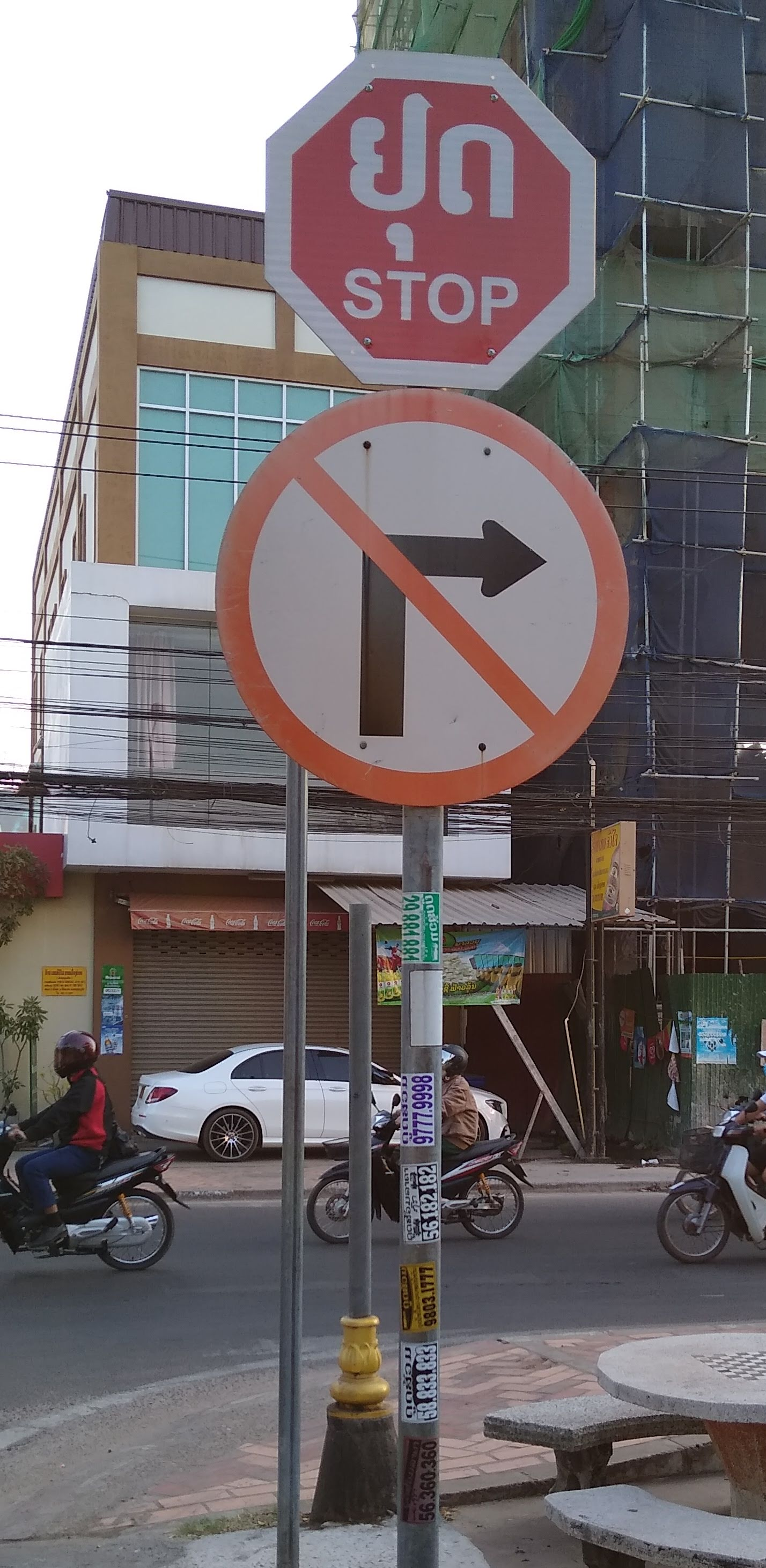
"Stop" and "No right turn" signs in Vientiane

Road signs in Laos generally both follow those used in China and most European countries as set out in the Vienna Convention on Road Signs and Signals. Despite this, the country itself has never signed the Vienna Convention on Road Signs and Signals. Inscriptions on traffic signs are in Lao, the national language of Laos. However, English is also used for stop and important public places such as tourist attractions, airports, railway stations, and immigration checkpoints. Both Lao and English are used on directional signage.

== Warning signs ==
Curve to left

Curve to right

Double curve, first to left

Double curve, first to right

Steep descent

Steep ascent

Road narrows

Road narrows on left side

Road narrows on right side

Opening bridge

Quayside or riverbank

Uneven road

Bump

Dip

Soft verges

Slippery road

Loose gravel

Falling rocks

Pedestrian crossing

Children

Cyclists

Cattle ahead

Deer ahead

Traffic lights ahead

Crossroads without priority

Crossroads with priority

Side road junction to left

Side road junction to right

Give way ahead

Stop ahead

Roundabout

Two-way traffic

Traffic queues

Level crossing with barriers ahead

Level crossing without barriers ahead

Single track level crossing

Multiple track level crossing

Level crossing countdown marker (150 m)

Level crossing countdown marker (100 m)

Level crossing countdown marker (50 m)

Low-flying aircraft

Crosswind

Accident

Other dangers

Traffic switchover point

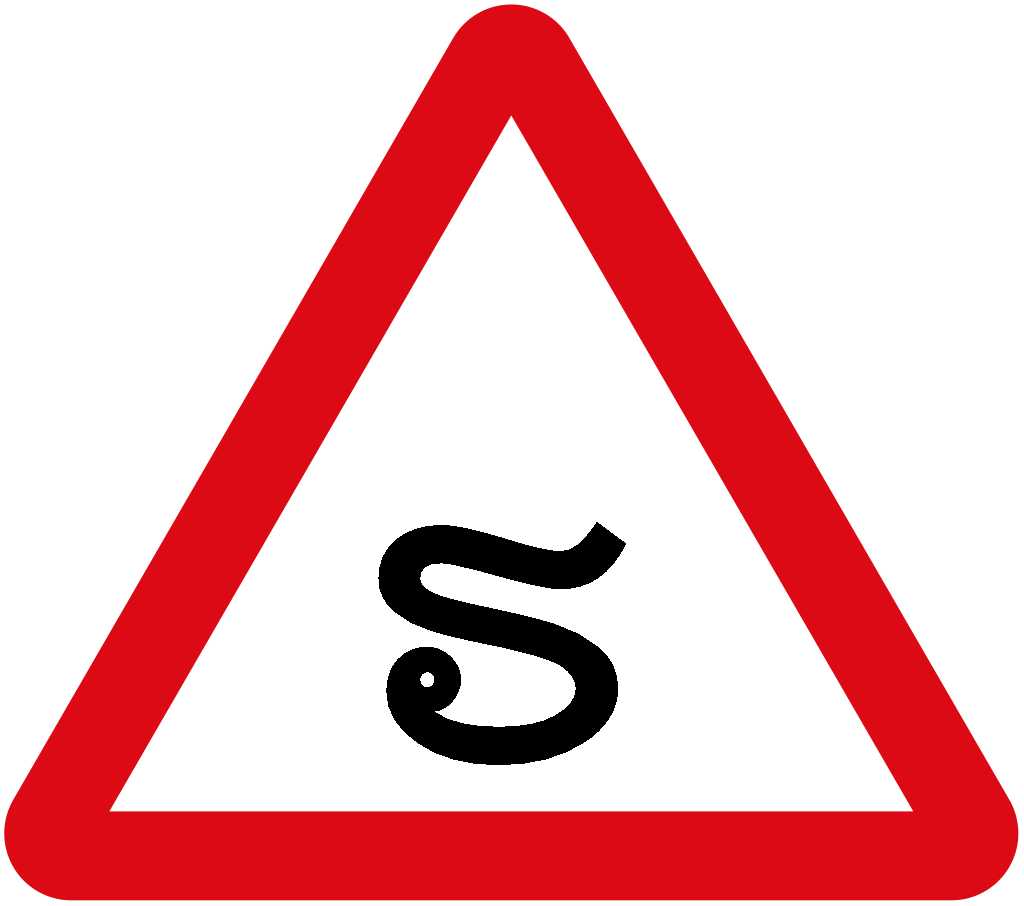
Learner driver

== Priority signs ==
Stop

Stop (Lao and English language)

Give way

Priority road

End of priority road

Priority for oncoming traffic

Priority over oncoming traffic

== Prohibition signs ==
No entry

Closed for all vehicles

No motor vehicles, except motorcycles

No motorcycles

No cyclists

No mopeds

No trucks

No animal-drawn vehicles

No handcarts

No pedestrians

No agricultural vehicles

No vehicles carrying explosives

No vehicles carrying dangerous water pollutants

No vehicles carrying dangerous goods

No motor vehicles

No motor and animal-drawn vehicles

Maximum length

Maximum weight

Maximum width

Maximum height

Maximum speed limit

End of maximum speed limit

No left turn

No right turn

No U-turn

No straight

No overtaking

No overtaking by trucks

End of no overtaking

End of no overtaking by trucks

No parking or waiting

No stopping or standing

No parking at odd days

No parking at even days

No horns

End of all restrictions

Customs

== Mandatory signs ==
Proceed straight

Turn left

Turn right

Turn left ahead

Turn right ahead

Proceed straight or turn left

Proceed straight or turn right

Turn left or right

Pass onto left

Pass onto right

Pass either side

Roundabout

Bike path

Pedestrian path

Bridle path

Shared pedestrian and cycle path

Segregated pedestrian and cycle path

Snow chains mandatory

Minimum speed limit

End of minimum speed limit

Route for vehicles carrying dangerous goods (straight)

Route for vehicles carrying dangerous goods (left)

Route for vehicles carrying dangerous goods (right)

== Informatory signs ==
Pedestrian crossing

One-way street

One-way street

One-way street

Living street

End of living street

Parking

Parking (Downtown Vientiane)

Bus stop

Tram stop

Tunnel

End of tunnel

Hospital

First aid

Dead end

Petrol station

Telephone

Emergency telephone

Hotel

Breakdown service

Camping or caravan

Restaurant

Expressway

End of expressway

Emergency stopping lot

Emergency ramp

Minimum speed limit for different lane

Maximum speed limit for different lane

Bus only lane

Split traffic lane

Merging traffic lane

Preselection lane

Motorway

End of motorway

Countdown marker (300 m)

Countdown marker (200 m)

Countdown marker (100 m)

== Temporary signs ==
Roadworks

Temporary traffic lights ahead

Slippery road

Soft verges

Road narrows

Road narrows on left side

Road narrows on right side

Two-way traffic

Loose gravel

Traffic queues

Other dangers

Preselection lane

== Additional plates ==
Box junction ahead

Distance

Side extension

Side extension

Side extension

Length

Beginning

Continuation

End

Sign of applies to trucks

Sign of applies to tralier

Direction of priority road

Disabled parking

== Traffic lights ==
Red

Red yellow

Green

Yellow
