= Road signs in China =

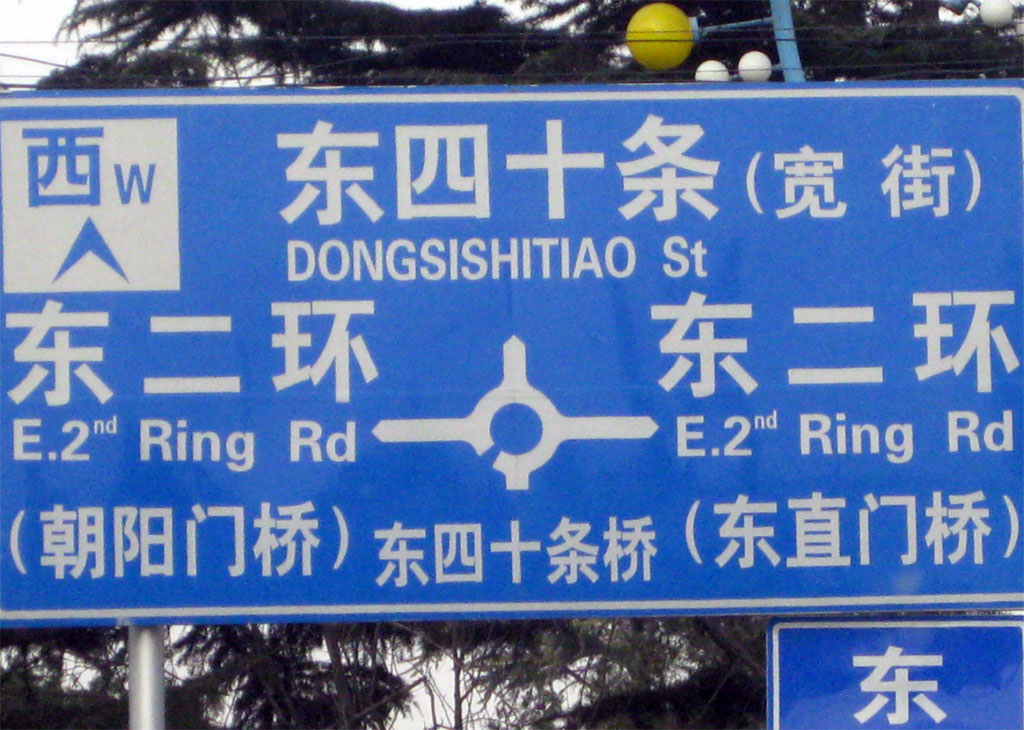
Road signs in Beijing

Road signs in the People's Republic of China are specified in the Guobiao standard GB 5678-2022.

China's traffic signs closely follow those used in Europe, the US, and Japan. However, China is not a signatory to the Vienna Convention on Road Signs and Signals. Road signs in China use a modified version of the FHWA Highway Gothic font.

The road signs used in the special administrative regions of Hong Kong and Macau differ from those used in Mainland China due to colonialism.

Warning signs are triangular in shape, as in Europe, but unlike European countries, warning signs in China have a black border and a yellow background instead of a red border and a white or yellow background. This makes it one of the few countries in the world to use this type of warning sign.

China drives to the right.

== Gallery ==
=== Warning signs ===
Intersection

Offset junctions (Left)

Offset junctions (Right)

Fork road merges (Left)

Fork road merges (Right)

Fork road ahead (Left)

Fork road ahead (Right)

T-junction ahead

Side road junction ahead (Left)

Side road junction ahead (Right)

Roundabout

Curve (Left)

Curve (Right)

Double curve (Right, then left)

Double curve (Left, then right)

Multiple curves

Multiple curves (Alt.)

Steep ascent

Steep descent

Continued descent

Road narrows on both sides

Road narrows on right

Road narrows on left

Narrow bridge

Two-way traffic ahead

Pedestrian crossing ahead

Children ahead

Traffic lights ahead

Domestic animals

Wild animals (option 1)

Wild animals (option 2)

Falling debris (Left)

Falling debris (Right)

Dangerous crosswinds

Slippery road

Mountain road (Left)

Mountain road (Right)

Riverbank (Right)

Riverbank (Left)

Cross-village road

Tunnel ahead

Ferry

Hump bridge

Bumpy road

Bump

Dip

Flooded road

Railway crossing ahead (with safety barriers)

Railway crossing ahead (without safety barriers)

Railroad crossing (single track)

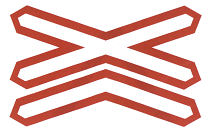
Railroad crossing (multiple tracks)

Cyclists

Wheelchairs ahead

Accident area

Slow

Turn left and/or right to detour

Turn left to detour

Turn right to detour

Caution

Roadworks ahead

Manual traffic control

Advisory speed

Turn on lights for driving through tunnel

Lane with tidal drive

Keep a safe distance

Crossroads with a dual carriageway

T-junction with a dual carriageway

Merging traffic on left

Merging traffic on right

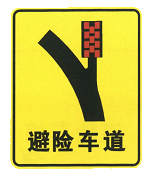
Escape lane

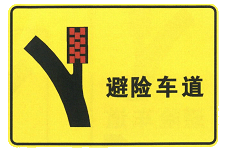
Escape lane (Alt.)

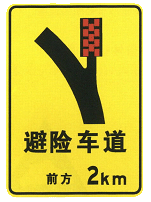
2km to escape lane

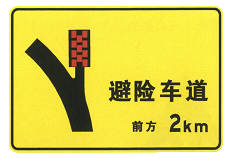
2km to escape lane (Alt.)

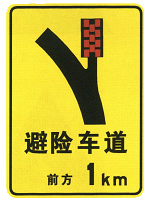
1km to escape lane

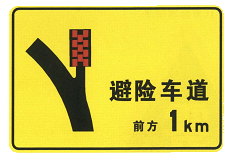
1km to escape lane (Alt.)

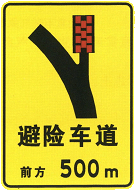
500m to escape lane

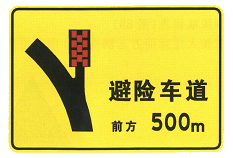
500m to escape lane (Alt.)

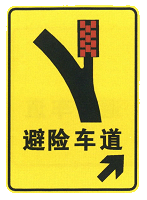
Escape lane on right

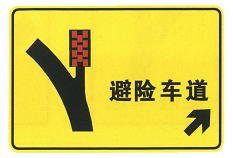
Escape lane on right (Alt.)

Snow ahead

Rain ahead

Fog ahead

Thunderstorm ahead

Traffic queues likely ahead

Traffic emergency ahead

=== Prohibitory signs ===
Stop

Yield/give way

Yield to oncoming traffic

No entry for both vehicular traffic and pedestrians

No entry for vehicular traffic

No motor vehicles

No freight vehicles

No electric scooters

No buses

No cars

No trailers

No tractors

No three-wheelers

No motorcycles

No freight vehicles and tractors

No bicycles

No horse-drawn vehicles

No passenger bikes

No freight bikes

No handcarts

No pedestrians

No left turns

No left turns for freight vehicles

No right turns

No right turns for cars

Do not proceed straight

No left and right turns

Do not proceed straight and no left turns

Do not proceed straight and no right turns

No U-turns

No overtaking

End of no overtaking area

No stopping

No parking

No honking

Maximum width

Maximum height

Maximum weight

Maximum weight per axle

Maximum speed limit (20)

Maximum speed limit (30)

Maximum speed limit (40)

Maximum speed limit (50)

Maximum speed limit (60)

Maximum speed limit (70)

Maximum speed limit (80)

Maximum speed limit (90)

Maximum speed limit (100)

End of maximum speed limit

Security check

No vehicles carrying dangerous goods

Customs

Speed limit zone

End of speed limit zone

No parking zone

End of no parking zone

No stopping zone

End of no stopping zone

=== Indicative signs ===
Proceed straight

Turn left

Turn right

Proceed straight and/or turn left

Proceed straight and/or turn right

Turn left and/or right

Keep to the right

Keep to the left

Proceed straight and turn left via ramp of Cloverleaf interchange

Proceed straight and turn right via ramp of interchange

Roundabout

One-way street to right

One-way street

Pedestrians only

Honking allowed

Minimum speed limit

Priority at junction

Priority over oncoming vehicles

Crosswalk

Lane for turn right

Lane for right turns

Lane for proceeding straight

Lane for proceeding straight and right turns

Lane for proceeding straight and left turns

Lane for U-turns

Lane for U-turn and left turns

Bus lane

Limited-access road

Lane for automobiles

Bicycles only

Lane for bicycles

Lane for Bus rapid transit

High-occupancy vehicle lane

Keep right for trucks

Parking spot

Parking spot to left

Parking place to right

Curb parking

U-turn

=== Informational signs ===
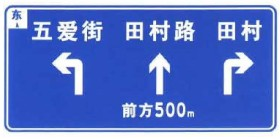
Directional sign with distance shown

Directional sign with distance shown and with lane divides

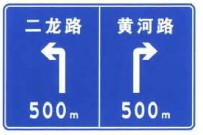
T-junction directional sign with distance shown

Intersection with distance shown

Intersection with distance shown (Example 2)

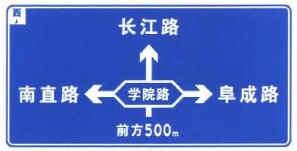
Intersection from campus road with distance shown

Intersection

Intersection (Example 2)

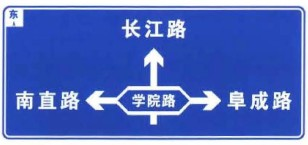
Intersection from campus road

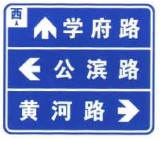
Directional sign to roads given

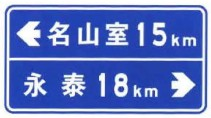
Directional sign with distances to places given

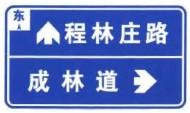
Directional sign to places given

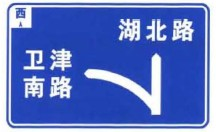
Ramp (Left)

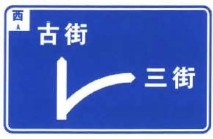
Ramp (Right)

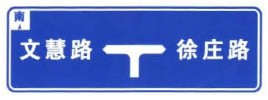
T-junction

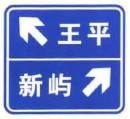
Exits to left and right

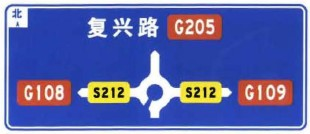
Roundabout

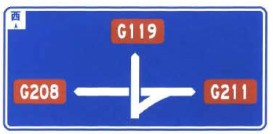
National Highway interchange

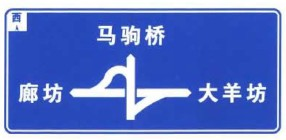
Interchange

Exit (Left)

Exit (Right)

National Highway

Provincial Highway

County Highway

Rural Highway

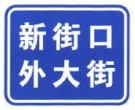
Street sign

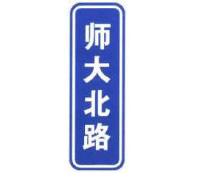
Vertically-written street sign

Street sign with directions and address numbers on either side

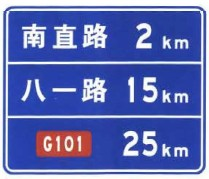
Distance to roads given

Place name

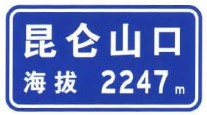
Place name with elevation

City limits

Road maintenance team

Road maintenance team (Example 2)

Hospital ahead

Low-flying aircraft

Fuel station and car wash

Parking

Parking ahead

Emergency curb

Pedestrian overpass

Pedestrian underpass

Disabled parking

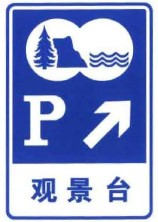
Sightseeing area and parking (Right)

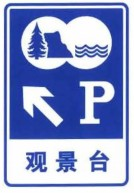
Sightseeing area and parking (Left)

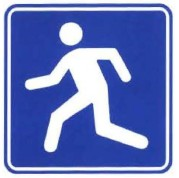
Emergency shelter

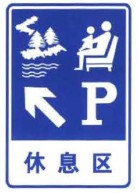
Rest area (left)

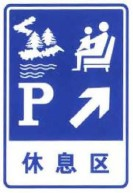
Rest area (right)

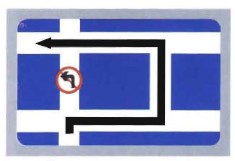
Alternative route to street desired

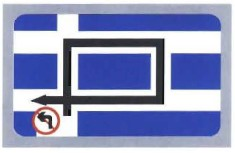
Alternative route to street desired

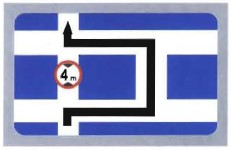
Alternative route for height-restricted vehicles

Cul-de-sac/dead end

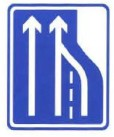
3-lane road merges to 2 lanes

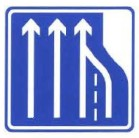
4-lane road merges to 3 lanes

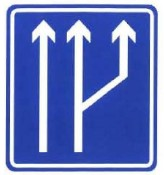
2-lane road expands to 3 lanes

Traffic cameras ahead

Tunnel ends in 2500m

Tunnel ends in 2500m (left)

Chevron (Left)

Chevron (Left)

Chevron with two arrows (Left)

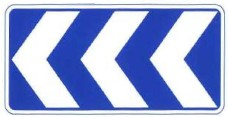
Chevron with three arrows (Left)

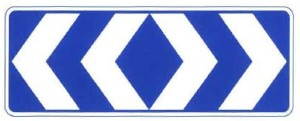
T-junction both ways

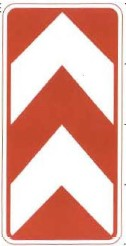
Hazard marker or pass either side

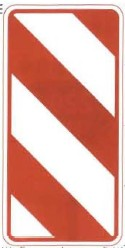
Hazard marker (Right)

Hazard marker (Left)

Exit (Left)

Exit (Right)

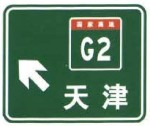
Exit to highway (Left)

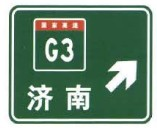
Exit to highway (Right)

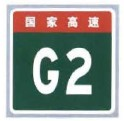
National Highway sign without name below

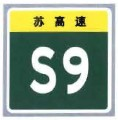
Provincial Highway sign without name below

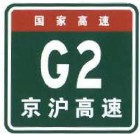
National Highway sign with name below

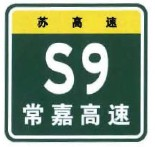
Provincial Highway sign with name below (S9 should not be Changjia (G1521))

Highway name

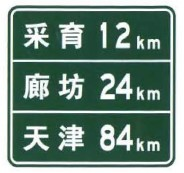
Distance to cities given

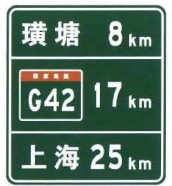
Distance to cities and highway given

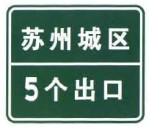
Area name with number of exits within

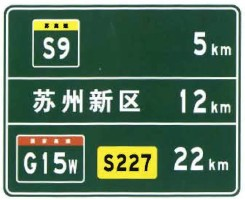
Distance to cities and highway given (example 2)

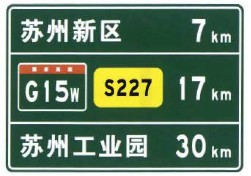
Distance to cities and highway given (example 3)

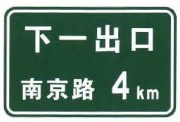
Next exit with road name only

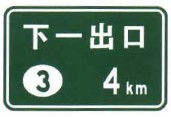
Next exit with exit number only

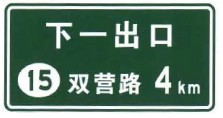
Next exit with both exit number and road name

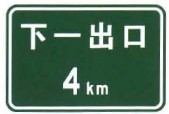
Next exit in without either exit number and road name

Exit number

Exit number (Left exit)

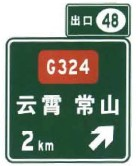
Highway Exit in 2km

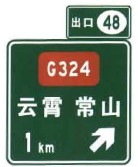
Highway Exit in 1km

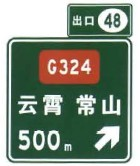
Highway Exit in 500m

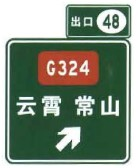
Highway Exit

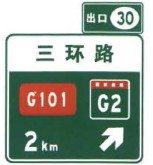
Highway Exit in 2km (Example 2)

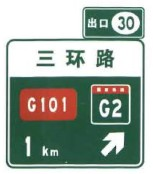
Highway Exit in 1km (Example 2)

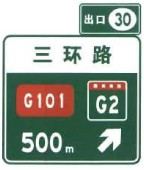
Highway Exit in 500m (Example 2)

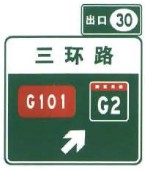
Highway Exit (Example 2)

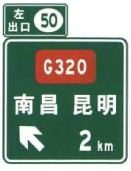
Highway Exit in 2km (Left)

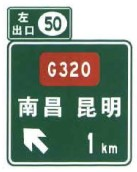
Highway Exit in 1km (Left)

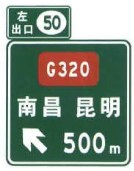
Highway Exit in 500m (Left)

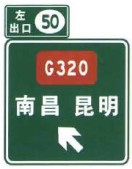
Highway Exit (Left)

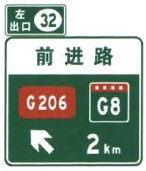
Highway Exit in 2km (Left) (Example 2)

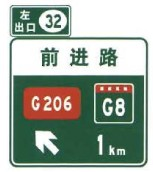
Highway Exit in 1km (Left) (Example 2)

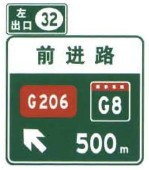
Highway Exit in 500m (Left) (Example 2)

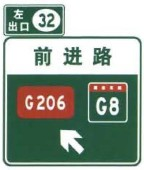
Highway Exit (Left) (Example 2)

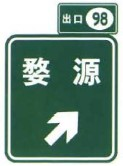
Exit with exit number

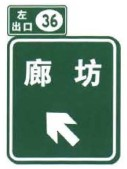
Exit with exit number (Left)

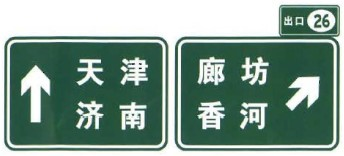
Overhead highway sign plus exit

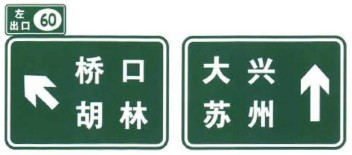
Overhead highway sign plus exit (Left)

National Highway

National Highway branch

Highway name

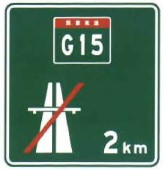
National Highway ends in 2km

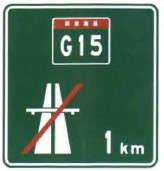
National Highway ends in 1km

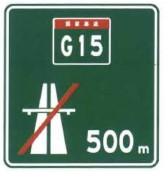
National Highway ends in 500m

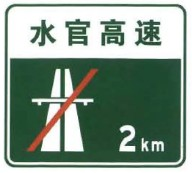
Highway ends in 2km

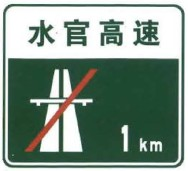
Highway ends in 1km

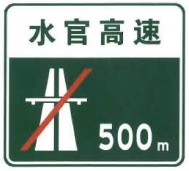
Highway ends in 500m

National Highway ends

National Highway branch ends

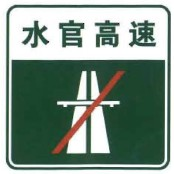
Highway ends

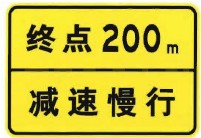
Highway ends in 200m; Reduce speed

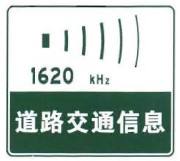
Tune to 1620kHz for traffic information

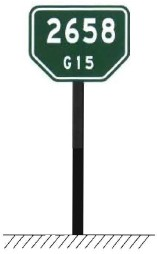
Milestone with highway designation

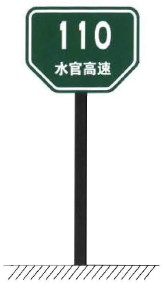
Milestone with highway name

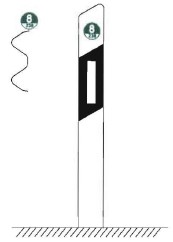
Milestone

Park to receive toll ticket

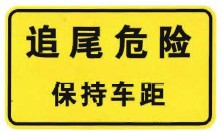
Danger of tailgating (i.e. high traffic zone); Keep your distance

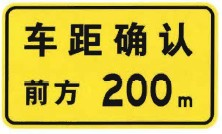
Maintain a distance of 200m from vehicles ahead

0 meters marker

50 meters marker

100 meters marker

Advisory speed in fog

Advisory speed in fog: 50 km/h

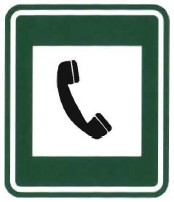
Emergency telephone

Emergency telephone in 400m (Left)

Emergency telephone in 400m (Right)

Emergency telephone on both sides in 500m

Rescue telephone

Rescue telephone (Example 2)

2km to toll gate

1km to toll gate

500m to toll gate

Toll gate

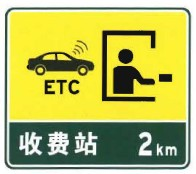
2km to toll gate that supports ETC

1km to toll gate that supports ETC

500m to toll gate that supports ETC

Toll gate that supports ETC

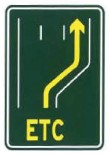
ETC lane to shoulder

ETC lane straight ahead

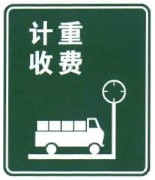
Weigh station with tolls

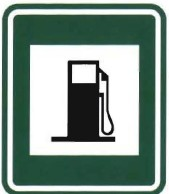
Gas station

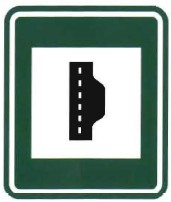
Emergency curb

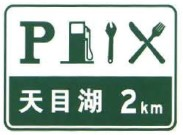
Full service area and restaurant in 2km

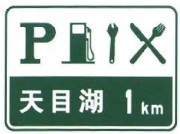
Full service area and restaurant in 1km

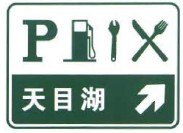
Full service area and restaurant exit

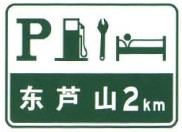
Full service and lodging area in 2km

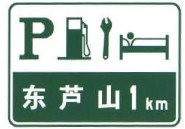
Full service area and lodging in 1km

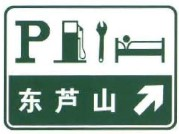
Full service area and lodging exit

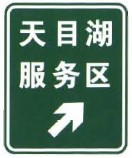
Service area exit

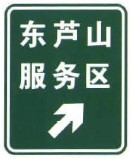
Service area exit (Example 2)

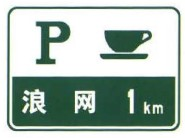
Exit to parking and cafe in 1km

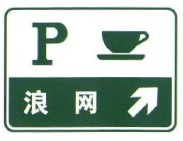
Exit to parking and cafe

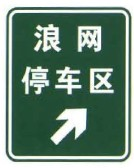
Rest area exit

Parking in 1km

Parking exit

Parking exit (Small)

Outdoor parking area

Indoor parking area

Climbing lane for large trucks

Climbing lane (Right lane) for large trucks

Climbing lane

Climbing lane ends

Weigh station in 2km

Weigh station in 1km

Weigh station in 500m

Weigh station exit

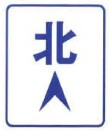
Compass direction

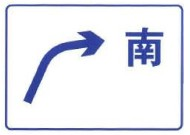
Straight exit to compass direction given

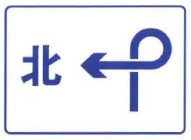
Cloverleaf exit to compass direction given

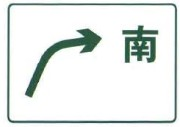
Straight exit to compass direction given (Green)

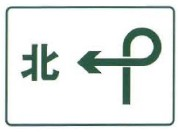
Cloverleaf exit to compass direction given (Green)

Compass direction (Green)

=== Tourist signs ===
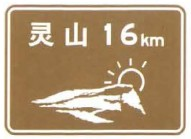
Distance to peak

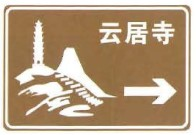
Temple to right

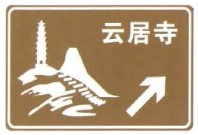
Temple exit

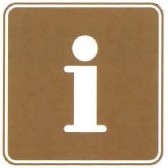
Information

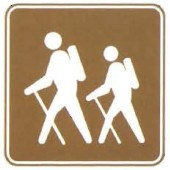
Hiking

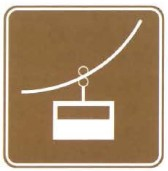
Cable car

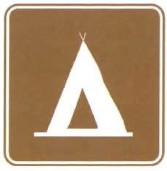
Camp

Campsite

Playground

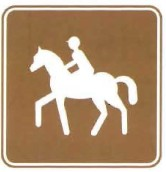
Horseback riding

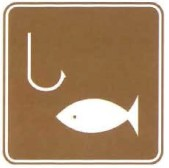
Fishing

Golf

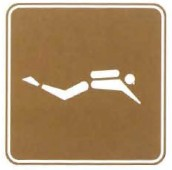
Diving

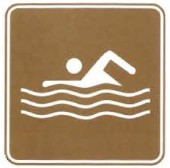
Swimming

Rowing

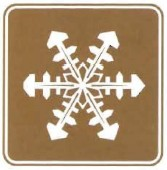
Site has snow

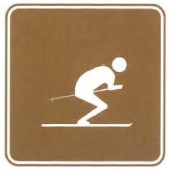
Skiing

Ice-skating

=== Other signs ===
Duration for traffic

Multiple durations for traffic

All traffic except for buses

Car traffic

Truck traffic

Truck and tractor traffic

Reserved for private use

One way (straight)

Two way

One way (right)

One way (left)

Keep left

Keep right

Turn right

Turn left

Distance (Straight)

Distance (Left)

Distance (Both ways)

Distance (Right)

Area inside road given

Distance marker

School

Customs

Accident

Collapse

Driving practice route

Driving test route

School bus stop

Trucks only in 100m in time given

=== Other advisory signs ===
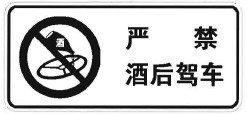
No drunk driving

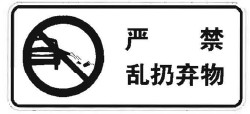
No littering

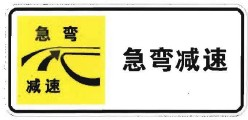
Slow; sharp bend (Right)

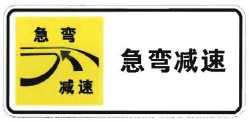
Slow; sharp bend (Left)

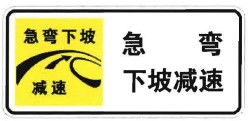
Slow; sharp bend and dip (Right)

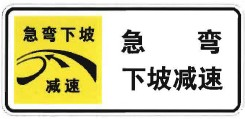
Slow; sharp bend and dip (Left)

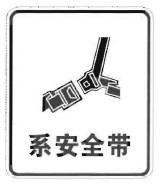
Fasten your seatbelt

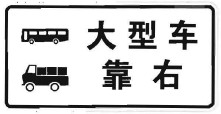
Large vehicles keep right

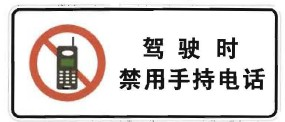
Do not use phones while driving

School bus stop

== Retired signs ==
=== 1934 road signs ===
Uneven road

Series of bends

Crossroad

Level crossing with barriers

Level crossing without barriers

Danger

No vehicles

No entry

No motor vehicles with more than three wheels

No motor vehicles

No parking

Mandatory direction

Weight limit

Speed limit

Parking

Caution

First aid

=== 1955 road signs ===
No turns

Proceed left

Watch for pedestrians

Proceed right

U-turn permitted

Parking

Crossroad

Curves

Railroad crossing

Danger

Do not enter

No vehicles

No parking

No motor vehicles except motorcycles

No trucks

No motor vehicles

Weight limit

Height limit

No U-turns

No motorcycles

No overtaking

Speed limit

No horse-drawn carts

=== 1972 road signs ===
==== Warning signs ====
Road narrows (both sides)

Road narrows (right side)

Road narrows (left side)

Two-way traffic

Pedestrian crossing ahead

Children

Traffic lights

Rockfall

Crosswinds

Slippery surface

Dangerous road alongside a mountain on the right

Embankment

Residential area

Tunnel

Ferry

Arch bridge

Ford

Railway crossing

Crossroads

T-junction

Left side road

Right side road

Roundabout

Left curve

Right curve

Double curve

Triple curve

Steep ascent

Steep descent

Roadworks

Danger

==== Prohibitory signs ====
No vehicles

No entry

No motor vehicles

No trucks

No three-wheeled vehicles

No buses

No trailers

No tractors

No motorcycles

No trucks and tractors

No bicycles

No horse-drawn vehicles

No freight bikes

No handcarts

No pedestrians

No left turn

No right turn

No U-turn

No overtaking

End of no overtaking

No honking

Maximum width

Maximum height

Maximum weight

Maximum weight per axle

Maximum speed limit

End of maximum speed limit

Inspection

Stop

Yield

Yield to oncoming traffic

==== Indicative signs ====
Proceed straight

Turn left

Turn right

Proceed straight and or Turn left

Proceed straight and or Turn right

Turn right or left

Keep right

Keep left

Proceed straight and turn left via ramp

Proceed straight and turn right via ramp of interchange

Roundabout

One-way street to right

One-way street

Limited-access road

Bicycle path

Pedestrian path

Honking allowed

Priority intersection

Priority over oncoming vehicles

Lane for proceeding straight

Lane for turn right

Lane for proceeding straight and right turns

Pedestrian crossing

=== 2009 road signs ===
Maximum Speed limit (40km/h)

End of maximum speed limit (40km/h)
