= Road signs in Mauritius =

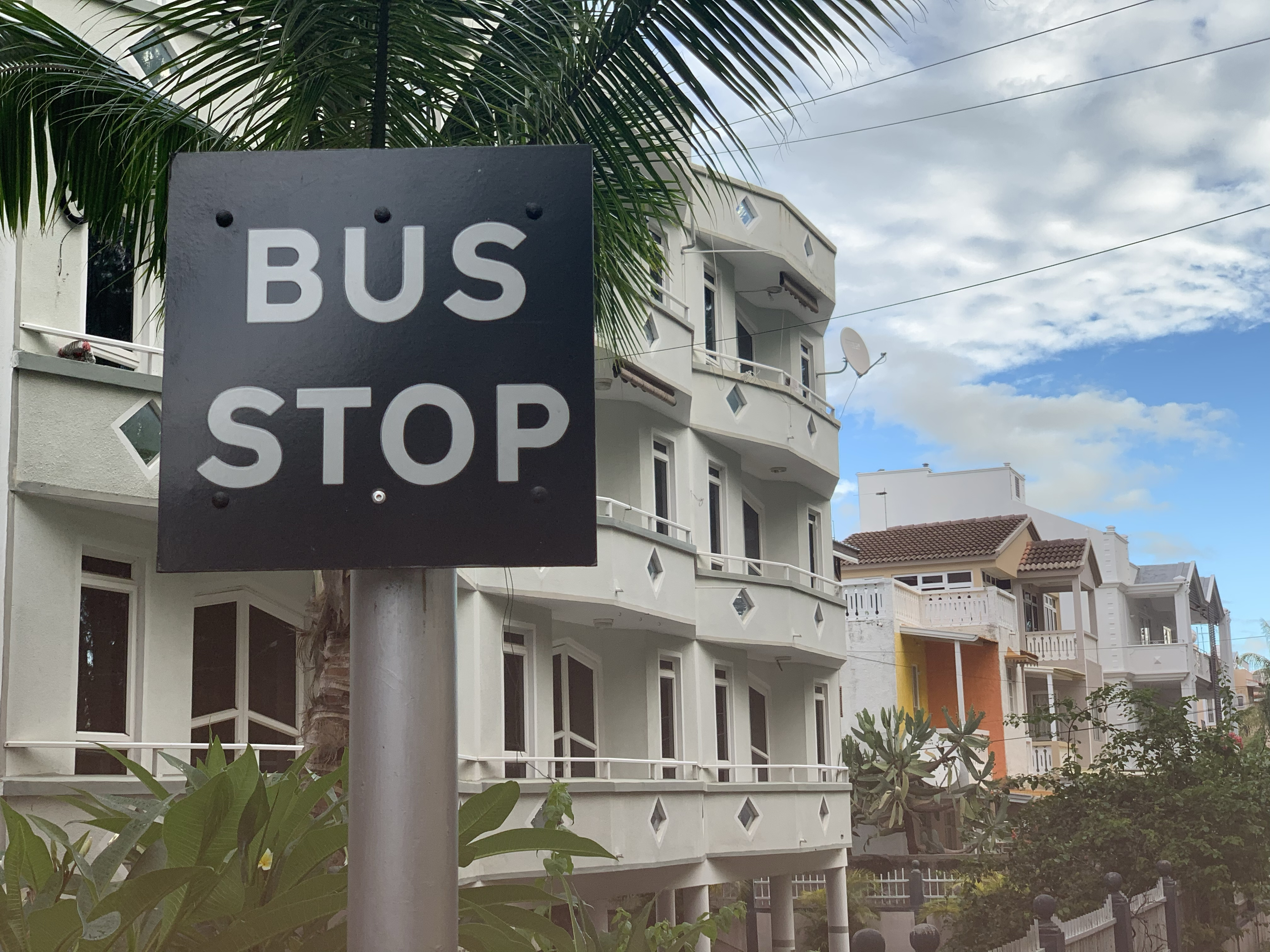
A bus stop sign at Flic en Flac.

Road signs in Mauritius are standardised traffic signs used in Mauritius according to the Traffic Signs Regulations 1990 (French: Règlement sur la Signalisation Routière 1990). They are heavily modelled on road signs in the United Kingdom, since Mauritius is a former British colony, making Mauritius one of the few Southern African Development Community member states who have not adopted its system of road signing.

== Signing system ==
The traffic signs are divided into three classes: circles give orders, triangles warn of possible dangers and rectangles give information. Different colours are used within these shapes; blue circles are mandatory signs, which give positive instructions, while red circles are prohibitory signs, which give negative instructions. Blue rectangles give general information while green rectangles are used for direction signs on main roads. However, there are three exceptions for these shapes and colour rules; these are the octagonal stop sign, the diamond priority road sign and the inverted red triangle give way sign.

== Warning signs ==
Warning signs indicate a hazard ahead on the road that may not be readily apparent to a driver.

Curve to the right

Double curve to the right

Chevrons

Crossroad

Side road (right)

T-Junction

Staggered junction

Traffic merging from the left

Traffic signals ahead

Roundabout ahead

Pedestrian crossing ahead

Pedestrians in the road ahead

Children

Roadworks ahead

Cyclists

Domestic animals (cattle)

Wild animals (deer)

Slippery road

Loose gravel

Falling rocks

Hump bridge

Hump

Uneven surface

Quayside

Steep ascent

Steep descent

Low-flying aircraft

Crosswinds

Ungated level crossing

Gated level crossing

Two-way traffic across one-way road

Two-way traffic ahead

Road narrows on right side

Road narrows on both sides

Right lane ends

Other dangers nearby

== Priority signs ==
Priority signs are intended to instruct road users on what they must or should do (or not do) under a given set of circumstances.

Give way

Stop

Priority road

Priority road ends

Give way to oncoming vehicles

Priority over oncoming vehicles

Temporary closure of road - Go

Temporary closure of road - Stop

== Prohibitiory signs ==
Prohibitory signs are used to prohibit certain types of manoeuvres or some types of traffic. The No symbol surrounding a pictogram is used to indicate something that is not permitted.

No vehicles - Vehicular traffic prohibited in both directions except for cyclists being pushed by pedestrians

No entry

No motor vehicles

No entry for motorcycles

No trucks

No buses and coaches

No agricultural vehicles (Tractors)

No cyclists

No entry for handcarts

No entry for pedestrians

Weight Limit

Axle weight limit

Height limit

Width limit

Length limit

No left turn

No right turn

No U-turns

No overtaking

No overtaking for lorries

No motor noise

Maximum speed limit (50 km/h)

End of all prohibitions

Maximum speed limit zone

No parking

No stopping (Clearway)

Prohibition of passing without stopping

Prohibition of passing without stopping - Police

Prohibition of passing without stopping - Customs

Prohibition of passing without stopping - Children

== Mandatory signs ==
Mandatory signs are used to set the obligations of all traffic which use a specific area of road. Unlike prohibitory or restrictive signs, mandatory signs tell traffic what it must do, rather than must not do.

Left turn only

Right turn only

Vehicular traffic must turn to the left ahead

Vehicular traffic must turn to the right ahead

Ahead only (turning left and right is prohibited)

Pass on the left

Pass on the right

Pass either side

Roundabout - Vehicles entering the junction must give way to traffic to vehicles coming from the right

Pedestrians only

Cyclists only

Buses only

Minimum speed limit (30 Km/h)

End of minimum speed limit (30 Km/h)

== Information signs ==
Information signs informs people.

Hump

Pedestrian crossing

One-way traffic

No through road

No through road to the right

No through road to the left

In

Out

No entry to a designated area

No exit to a designated area

Parking

Hospital

Sign notifying an entry to a motorway

Sign notifying an exit from a motorway

Dual carriageway

Speed camera ahead, reminder of speed limit is 60 km/h

Bus stop
