= Road signs in Angola =

Road signs in Angola are heavily modelled on road signs in Portugal, since Angola is a former Portuguese colony. They are regulated in Código de Estrada and conform to the general pattern of road signs as set out in the Vienna Convention on Road Signs and Signals. Despite this, Angola is not a signatory to this convention, but Portugal is.

Despite being a member of the Southern African Development Community, Angola's road signs are yet to be harmonised with the traffic sign system used in fellow member states, though intentions have been expressed to transition to this system. Angola drives on the right.

== Warning signs ==
Dangerous curve to right

Dangerous curve to left

Double curve, first to right

Double curve, first to left

Bump

Dip

Uneven road or series of bumps ahead

Steep hill downwards

Steep hill upwards

Road narrows on both side

Road narrows on left

Road narrows on right

Slippery road

Loose chippings

Dangerous shoulder on right

Dangerous shoulder on left

Unprotected quayside or riverbank ahead

Falling rocks

Opening or swing bridge

Ice or snow

Sidewinds

Reduce visibility

Children

Elderly people crossing

Pedestrian crossing

Pedestrians

Cyclists

Equestrians

Cattle

Deer

Tunnel

Low-flying aircraft

Traffic signals ahead

Roadworks

Crossroad without priority

Two-way traffic

Level crossing with gates or barriers

Level crossing without gates or barriers

Tramway

Other dangers

Traffic queues likely

Accident

== Priority signs ==
Give way

Stop

Priority road

End of priority road

Priority for oncoming traffic

Priority over oncoming traffic

Roundabout ahead

Crossroad with priority

Side road with priority on left

Side road with priority on right

Merging traffic on left

Merging traffic on right

== Prohibition signs ==
No entry

Closed all vehicles directions both

No motor vehicles

No dangerous good

No lorries

No lorries over 3.5 tonnes

No motorcycles or mopeds

No mopeds

No cycles or mopeds

No agricultural vehicles

No animal-drawn vehicles

No hand-carts

No pedestrians

No equestrians

No trailers

No trailers over 2 tons

No vehicles carrying dangerous goods

No vehicles carrying explosives

No vehicles carrying polluted water

No buses

No motor vehicles

No lorries and trailers

No motor vehicles and animal-drawn vehicles

No trucks and animal-drawn vehicles

No pedestrians, mopeds, animals, and handcarts

No bicycles, mopeds, and motorcycles

No trucks and buses

Axle limit

Weight limit

Length limit

Width limit

Height limit

Driving vehicles distance

No right turn

No left turn

No U-turn

Maximum speed limit

No overtaking

No overtaking by lorries

No overtaking by motorcycles

No parking

No standing or parking

No hooting

Customs

Toll

National speed limit

End of maximum speed limit

End of overtaking prohibition

End of overtaking by lorries prohibition

End of no overtaking by motorcycles

End of no parking

End of hooting prohibition

== Mandatory signs ==
Turn right

Turn left

Straight ahead

Turn left ahead

Turn right ahead

Straight ahead or turn left

Straight ahead or turn right

Turn left or right

Pass on right

Pass on left

Roundabout

Trucks only

Heavy vehicles only

Buses only

Cycles only

Pedestrians only

Equestrians only

Domesticated animals only

Pedestrians and cycles only

Pedestrians to the right and cycles to the left

Minimum speed limit

Snow chains on tires

Headlights on

End of trucks only

End of heavy vehicles only

End of buses only

End of bicycles only

End of pedestrians only

End of equestrians only

End of domesticated animals only

End of pedestrians and cycles only

End of pedestrians to the right and cycles to the left

End of minimum speed limit

End of snow chains on tires

Headlights off

== Information signs ==
Parking

Hospital

One way

No thru road

Advisory speed limit

Pedestrian crossing

Bus stop

Tram stop

Motorway

Expressway

Escape lane

U-turn permitted

Tunnel

Living street

Chevron left/right

Multiple chevron left/right

Curve to the (T)

Barrier

== Additional signs ==
Distance

Distance for stop sign
