= Clinton Riggs =

American law enforcement innovator and educator

Clinton E. Riggs
- Born: July 15, 1910; Fairview, Oklahoma, US
- Died: May 22, 1997 (aged 86); Tulsa, Oklahoma, US
- Occupation: Law enforcement officer
- Years active: 36
- Known for: Inventor of "Yield" sign

Clinton E. Riggs (July 15, 1910–May 22, 1997) was a law enforcement innovator and educator who retired from the Tulsa Police Department officer as Administrative Chief in 1970 after 36 years of service. He conceived and implemented several improvements in the area of traffic enforcement, he is most noted for his invention of the first Yield Right of Way sign used in the United States.

== Biography ==
Clinton Riggs was born July 15, 1910, in Fairview, Oklahoma, in 1910. His family moved to Tulsa, where he graduated from Central High School in 1929. He joined the Tulsa Police Department (TPD) in 1934, but left to join the Oklahoma Highway Patrol in 1934. He was in the Army Air Corps during World War II, serving in intelligence and plant protection. After the war, he returned to the TPD, rising to the rank of administrative assistant chief. While employed at TPD, he also attended and graduated from the University of Tulsa College of Law in 1954. He retired from TPD in 1970. He later taught classes at University of Tulsa and at Tulsa Junior College (now called Tulsa Community College). TPD renamed its Uniform Division Southwest as the Clinton Riggs Police Station South in his honor.

Riggs was 86 years old when he died May 27, 1997, in Tulsa, Oklahoma.

== Achievements in law enforcement ==
Riggs had several significant achievements during his law enforcement. Undoubtedly the most notable, though controversial, was his invention of the Yield sign, used as a traffic control tool.

=== Original yield sign ===

In 1950, Riggs designed the first yield signs used in the United States, which he wanted to place at the intersection of First Street and Columbia Avenue. This was considered to be one of Tulsa's more dangerous intersections. (Note: Within a year, this intersection was rated as the seventh most dangerous in the city.) The sign was shaped like a keystone and painted yellow. Black lettering said, "Yield Right of Way." The signs were later removed. One is possessed by Thomas Riggs, the inventor's son. (Note: Modern Yield signs have a triangular shape and a red background, with the word "Yield" in black lettering.)

Riggs conceived of the concept while employed as a state trooper, attending Chicago's Northwestern Traffic Institute in 1939, and developed the idea further over the next decade. One of the class discussions concerned a common problem of motorists rolling through an uncontrolled intersection and the fact that police were reluctant to issue a traffic ticket. Riggs continued to think about the problem. His goal was to create a sign that would both control traffic at an intersection, but affix civil liability for a driver that failed to yield.

Selling the idea to others proved to be a challenge. Riggs' classmates were not convinced that simply using the word "Yield" would be effective, even after Riggs added the words "Right of Way." Tulsa's city attorney was also negative about the whole idea. Riggs also contacted the National Safety Council, who took no interest. Ignoring the naysayers, Riggs and his assistant, Paul Rice, simply proceeded to install them at the intersection.

Some sources have credited Paul Rice with the invention.^{dead link} Paul was a Tulsa city engineer who worked under Riggs, the Traffic Director of TPD. Riggs later told a Pittsburgh, PA interviewer that Paul had helped him erect some of the first signs in Tulsa, but later took credit for the invention in an article in Evanston, Indiana. Riggs' name was not even mentioned in the article. Riggs said he wrote Rice a letter complaining about his omission, but never received a reply. As late as 1989, Rice was still being credited with the invention in other news articles.

In 1954, the Manual on Uniform Traffic Control Devices for Streets and Highways published another design to be used at unmarked intersections.

In 1971, the Riggs design was officially superseded by the standardized American version, which consists of a white triangle within a red triangle and the word YIELD in red letters, superimposed on the white background, as shown in the Manual on Uniform Traffic Control Devices for Streets and Highways - 2003 Edition.

=== Other achievements ===
- Designed the Tulsa Police Department's shoulder patch, patterned after Riggs' original yield sign.
- Created the Tulsa Police Academy.
- Established a university degree requirement for new officers.
- Wrote police handbooks:
  - Law of Arrest for Police Officers
  - The Police Officer Witness.

== See also ==
Yield sign
