= Road signs in the Southern African Development Community =

A harmonised system of road signs has been adopted by a number of member states of the Southern African Development Community (SADC) – Botswana, Eswatini, Lesotho, Malawi, Mozambique, Namibia, South Africa, Tanzania, Zambia and Zimbabwe. They are regulated in the Southern African Development Community Road Traffic Signs Manual.

Non-SADC member Rwanda has adopted its own road sign system which resembles the SADC design.

== Background ==
Ten SADC member states entered into a Protocol Agreement to develop cooperation in infrastructure and services in June 1995. The intention to harmonise traffic signs among member states was part of this agreement. South Africa offered to take care of the harmonisation process, developing the Road Traffic Signs Manual based on two existing manuals – the Southern Africa Transport and Communications Commission Road Traffic Signs Manual, published in November 1990, and the South African Road Traffic Signs Manual, published in January 1993 – both of which were very similar and based on European traffic signing strategies.

As of 2025, not all SADC member states make use of this system – Comoros, the Democratic Republic of the Congo, Madagascar, Mauritius and Seychelles all make use of their own systems, whereas Angola is transitioning to the SADC design.

The typeface used on SADC road signs is DIN 1451.

=== National variants ===
The Road Traffic Signs Manual notes that complete uniformity is unachievable due to differing needs across its member states, such as language and the side of the road on which traffic travels:

- Most SADC member states drive on the left, but Angola, the Democratic Republic of the Congo, the Comoros, Madagascar and non-SADC member Rwanda drive on the right.
- Most SADC member states speak English as an official language, but Portuguese is the only official language in Angola and Mozambique.

The manual therefore prescribes 'national variants' to cater for these needs, included in sections at the end of each applicable chapter, indicating the permitted text and mirrored variants.

== Permanent road signs ==
=== Regulatory signs ===
==== Control signs ====
Stop

Stop. Two stop

Stop. But drivers turning left must give way / yield

Stop (3-way)

Stop (4-way)

Stop / Go manual control sign

Give Way / Yield

Give Way / Yield to pedestrians

Give way / Yield to Equestrians

Give way / Yield to pedestrians and equestrians

Give Way / Yield at roundabout

No entry

One-way roadway

One-way roadway

One-way roadway

Pedestrian priority zone

Give Way / Yield to oncoming traffic

==== Command signs ====
Minimum speed limit

Vehicles exceeding 10 tonnes GVM only

Keep Left

Keep Right

Turn Left

Turn Right

Proceed Straight

Turn left ahead

Turn right ahead

Pedestrians only

Cyclists only

Cyclists and pedestrians only

Cyclists and pedestrians only

Cyclists and pedestrians only

Cyclists and pedestrians only

Motorcycles only

Motorcars only

Taxis only

Mini-buses only

Midi-buses only

Buses only

Delivery vehicles only

Goods vehicles exceeding 3500 kg only

Goods vehicles exceeding 10 tonnes GVM only

Construction vehicles only

Vehicles transporting dangerous substances only

Abnormal vehicles only

Rickshaws only

Tour buses only

Agricultural vehicles only

Animal-drawn vehicles only

Toll road

Switch headlamps on

Buses and mini-buses only

Buses and midi-buses only

Buses, midi-buses and mini-buses only

Roundabout

Trams only

Buses and trams only

Buses, trams and mini-buses only

==== Prohibition signs ====
Speed limit of 5 km/h

Speed limit of 10 km/h

Speed limit of 20 km/h

Speed limit of 30 km/h

Speed limit of 40 km/h

Speed limit of 50 km/h

Speed limit of 60 km/h

Speed limit of 70 km/h

Speed limit of 75 km/h

Speed limit of 80 km/h

Speed limit of 90 km/h

Speed limit of 100 km/h

Speed limit of 120 km/h

Vehicles exceeding 12 tonnes GVM prohibited

End of weight limit

Vehicles exceeding 2 tonnes on a single axle prohibited

Vehicles exceeding 4.42 metres in height prohibited

Vehicles exceeding 15 metres in length prohibited

Excessive noise prohibited / Hooting prohibited

Hitch-hiking prohibited

Unauthorised vehicles prohibited

Left turn prohibited ahead

Right turn prohibited ahead

Left turn prohibited

Right turn prohibited

U-turn prohibited

Overtaking prohibited

Overtaking prohibited for heavy vehicles

Parking prohibited

Stopping prohibited

Pedestrians prohibited

Cyclists prohibited

Cyclists and pedestrians prohibited

Motorcycles prohibited

Motorcars prohibited

Taxis prohibited

Mini-buses prohibited

Midi-buses prohibited

Buses prohibited

Delivery vehicles prohibited

Goods vehicles exceeding 3500kg prohibited

Goods vehicles exceeding 10 tonnes GVM prohibited

Construction vehicles prohibited

Vehicles transporting dangerous substances prohibited

Abnormal vehicles prohibited

Rickshaws prohibited

Tour buses prohibited

Agricultural vehicles prohibited

Animal-drawn vehicles prohibited

Horses and riders prohibited

Vehicles exceeding 2.1 metres in width prohibited

Towed vehicles prohibited

Hawkers prohibited

Motorcycles and motorcars prohibited

Vehicles exceeding 12 tonnes on a tandem axle / bogie axle prohibited

==== Reservation signs ====
Reserved for buses

Reserved lane for buses

Start of a reserved lane for buses

Reserved lane for bicycles

Reserved for motorcycles

Reserved for motorcars

Reserved for taxis

Reserved for mini-buses

Reserved for midi-buses

Reserved for delivery vehicles

Reserved for goods vehicles

Reserved for goods vehicles exceeding 10 tonnes GVM

Reserved for construction vehicles

Reserved for vehicles transporting dangerous substances

Reserved for abnormal vehicles

Reserved for rickshaws

Reserved for tour buses

Reserved for high-occupancy vehicles

Reserved for ambulances / emergency vehicles

Reserved for police vehicles

Reserved for vehicles carrying disabled passengers

Reserved for diplomatic vehicles

Reserved for buses and mini-buses

Reserved lane for buses and mini-buses

Start of a reserved lane for buses and mini-buses

Reserved for buses and midi-buses

Reserved lane for buses and midi-buses

Start of a reserved lane for buses and midi-buses

Reserved for buses, midi-buses and mini-buses

Reserved lane for buses, midi-buses and mini-buses

Start of a reserved lane for buses, midi-buses and mini-buses

Reserved lane for high-occupancy vehicles

Start of a reserved lane for high-occupancy vehicles

Reserved for trams

Reserved lane for trams

Start of a reserved lane for trams

Reserved for buses and trams

Reserved lane for buses and trams

Start of a reserved lane for buses and trams

Reserved for buses, trams and mini-buses

Reserved lane for buses, trams and mini-buses

Start of a reserved lane for buses, trams and mini-buses

Reserved lane for buses

Reserved lane for buses and mini-buses

Reserved lane for buses and trams

Reserved lane for buses, trams and mini-buses

Reserved lane for high-occupancy vehicles

Reserved lane for authorised vehicles

Reserved lane for authorised vehicles

==== Parking signs ====
Parking for buses

Parking for bicycles

Parking

Parking with a 60-minute limit

Parking for motorcycles

Parking for motorcars

Parking for taxis

Parking for mini-buses

Parking for midi-buses

Parking for delivery vehicles

Parking for goods vehicles

Parking for goods vehicles exceeding 10 tonnes GVM

Parking for construction vehicles

Parking for vehicles transporting dangerous substances

Parking for abnormal vehicles

Parking for rickshaws

Parking for tour buses

Parking for high-occupancy vehicles

Parking for ambulances / emergency vehicles

Parking for police vehicles

Parking for vehicles carrying disabled passengers

Parking for diplomatic vehicles

Parking for buses and mini-buses

Parking for buses and midi-buses

Parking for buses, midi-buses and mini-buses

==== Comprehensive signs ====
Dual-carriageway freeway begins

Single-carriageway freeway begins

Living Street / Woonerf begins

==== Selective restriction signs ====
Applies during the specified hours

Applies during the specified hours

Applies during the specified days and hours

Applies during the specified days and hours

Parking is permitted within the days and hours specified, with a 30-minute limit

Parking is permitted within the hours specified, with a 60-minute limit

Applies during the day-time hours

Applies during the night-time hours

Applies to the left

Applies to the right

Applies to the left and right

Pay and display parking

Applies to vehicles exceeding 16 tonnes GVM

Applies to motorcycles with an engine size up to 125 cc

Traffic requiring local access also permitted

Applies for 5 kilometres

Maximum number of spaces in a parking reservation

Applies to buses

Applies to cyclists

Applies to motorcycles

Applies to motorcars

Applies to taxis

Applies to mini-buses

Applies to midi-buses

Applies to delivery vehicles

Applies to goods vehicles

Applies to goods vehicles exceeding 10 tonnes GVM

Applies to construction vehicles

Applies to vehicles transporting dangerous substances

Applies to abnormal vehicles

Applies to rickshaws

Applies to tour buses

Applies to high-occupancy vehicles

Applies to ambulances / emergency vehicles

Applies to police vehicles

Applies to vehicles carrying disabled passengers

Applies to diplomatic vehicles

Applies to agricultural vehicles

Applies to animal-drawn vehicles

Applies to towed vehicles

Applies to trams

==== De-restriction signs ====
End of minimum speed limit

End of toll route

Switch headlamps off

End of dual-carriage freeway

End of single-carriage freeway

End of living street / woonerf

=== Warning signs ===
Crossroad ahead

Crossroad ahead with priority

Crossroad ahead without priority

T-junction ahead

Skewed T-junction ahead

Skewed T-junction ahead

Side-road junction ahead

Side-road junction ahead

Staggered side-road junctions ahead

Staggered side-road junctions ahead

Sharp junction ahead

Sharp junction ahead

Sharp junction ahead

Sharp junction ahead

Fork ahead

Dual-carriageway ends ahead

Dual-carriageway ends ahead

Dual-carriageway begins ahead

Dual-carriageway begins ahead

Roundabout ahead

Gentle curve ahead

Gentle curve ahead

Sharp curve ahead

Sharp curve ahead

Hairpin curve ahead

Hairpin curve ahead

Winding road ahead

Winding road ahead

Series of curves ahead

Series of curves ahead

Two-way traffic ahead

Two-way traffic crossing ahead

Right lane ends ahead

Left lane ends ahead

Concealed driveway ahead

Concealed driveway ahead

Concealed driveways ahead

Traffic signal ahead

Stop control ahead

Give Way / Yield control ahead

Pedestrian crossing ahead

Pedestrians ahead

Children ahead

Cyclists ahead

Cattle ahead

Horses ahead

Sheep ahead

Antelopes ahead

Gate ahead

Motor gate ahead on right

Motor gate ahead on left

Motor gate ahead

Railway crossing ahead

Tunnel ahead

Height restriction ahead

Length restriction ahead

Steep descent ahead

Steep ascent ahead

Slow moving heavy vehicles ahead

Unpaved road surface ahead

Narrow bridge ahead

Single vehicle width passage ahead

Roadway narrows from both sides ahead

Roadway narrows from the right side ahead

Roadway narrows from the left side ahead

Uneven road surface ahead

Speed hump ahead

Slippery road ahead

Falling rocks ahead

Falling rocks ahead

Warning

"Danger" flashing light sign

Unprotected jetty edge or river bank ahead

Crosswinds ahead

Drift / Ford ahead

Low flying aircraft ahead

Agricultural vehicles ahead

Reduced visibility ahead

Traffic congestion ahead

Horse riders ahead

Elephants ahead

Warthogs ahead

Hippos ahead

Width restriction ahead

Danger of electrical shock

Trams ahead

Paved road surface ahead

Moveable bridge ahead

Railway crossing

Railway crossing with 2 or more tracks

Sharp curve marker

Sharp curve marker

Sharp curve marker

Sharp curve marker

T-junction marker

Dead end or road closure marker

Gore marker

Gore marker

=== Information signs ===
Dead end

Dead end

Dead end

Priority road ahead

Co-ordinated traffic signals at indicated speed

Multi-phase traffic signals

Bus stop ahead

Bus stop

Bus stop for all buses

Bus stop for authorised buses with line number

Bus stop for authorised buses with line numbers

Mini-bus stop

Mini-bus stop

Mini-bus stop for authorised mini-buses with line number

Mini-bus stop for authorised mini-buses with line numbers

Right-of-way over oncoming vehicles

Information centre

Park and Ride

Park and Ride

Modal transfer point

Modal transfer point

Modal transfer point

Pedestrian crossing (new)

Pedestrian crossing (old)

=== Combo signs ===
Speed limit of 120 km/h during the day

Speed limit of 100 km/h during the night

== Temporary road signs ==
Temporary road signs are largely the same as permanent ones, with the main exception that they feature a yellow background rather than white.

== See also ==
- Road signs in Angola
- Road signs in Mauritius
