= Road signs in Macau =

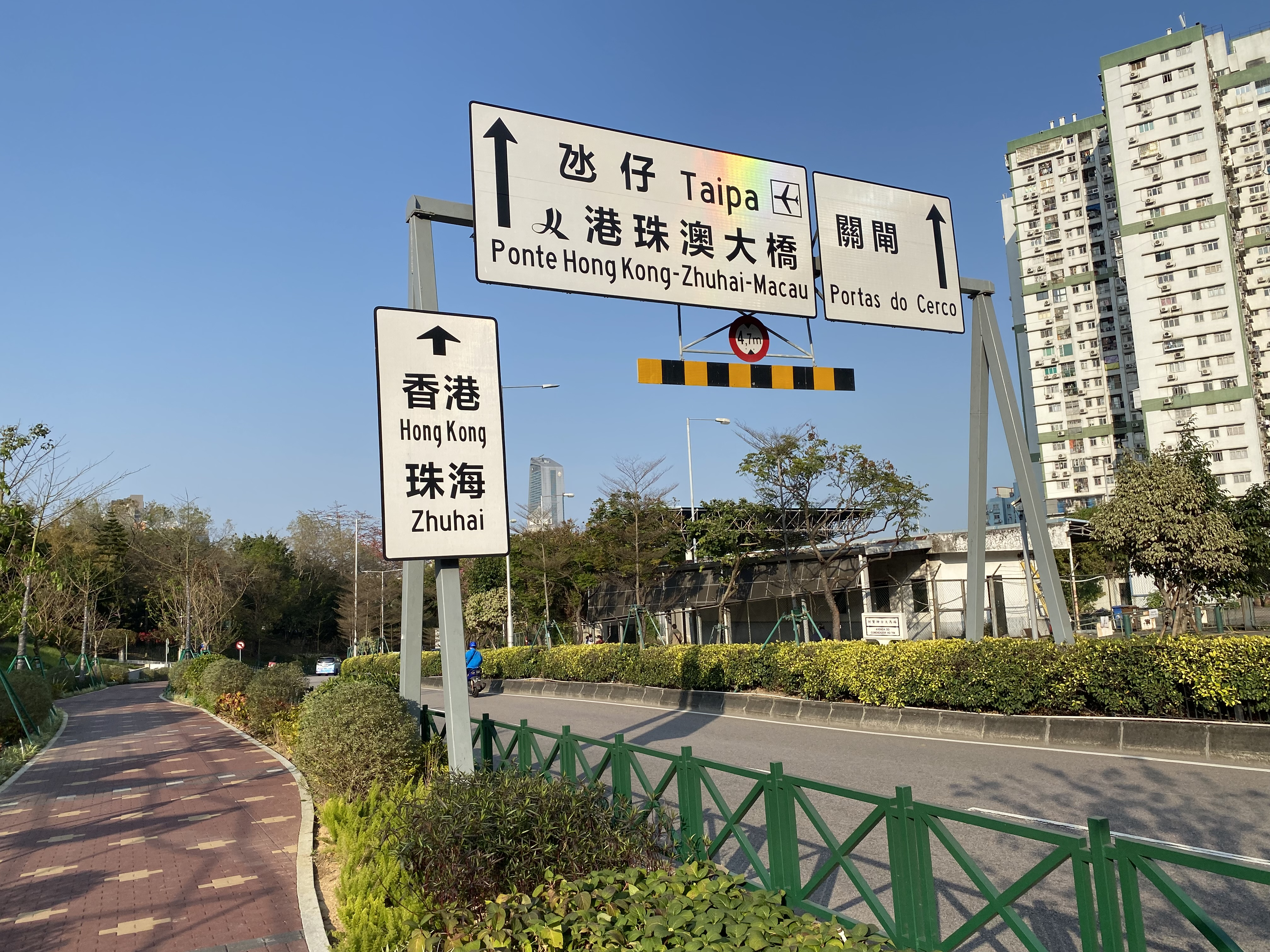
Traffic sign in Macau

Road signs in Macau are regulated in the Regulamento do Trânsito Rodoviário (Chinese: 道路交通規章) and standardised by the Secretary for Transport and Public Works. Due to being a former Portuguese territory, the road signage in Macau is similar to road signs used in Portugal until 1998, with the addition of traditional Chinese characters and some signs reversed to reflect driving on the left. After the transfer of sovereignty over Macau in 1999, the old style of Portuguese road signs was retained and still used to this day. Road signs conform to the general pattern of those as set out in the Vienna Convention on Road Signs and Signals and used in most European countries, although Macau is not a signatory to it, but Portugal is. Macau drives on the left.

== Warning signs ==
1a) — Curve to the right

1b) — Curve to the left

1c) — Curve to the right and then to the left

1d) — Curve to the left and then to the right

2a) — Crossroads or junction

2b) — Crossroads with a road that does not have priority

2c) — Junction with a road that does not have priority

2d) — Junction with a road that does not have priority

2e) — Merging traffic on the left

2f) — Merging traffic on the right

3a) — Bump

3b) — Dip on road

3c) — Uneven road

3d) — Soft shoulder

3e) — Tunnel

4a) — Children

4b) — Pedestrian crossing ahead

4b) — Pedestrian crossing ahead

5a) — Road narrows

5b) — Road narrows on the left

5c) — Road narrows on the right

6a) — Steep descent

6b) — Steep ascent

7a) — Roadworks

7b) — Loose chippings

7c) — Slippery surface

7d) — Falling rocks

7e) — Drawbridge

7f) — Unprotected quayside or river bank

7g) — Crosswinds

7h) — Traffic signals ahead

7i) — Roundabout ahead

7j) — Cyclists

7m) — Airstrip

8a) — Give way

9a) — Two-way traffic

10a) — Other dangers nearby

== Prohibitory signs ==
12a) — No throughfare

12b) — No entry

13a) — No right turn

13b) — No left turn

13c) — No U-Turns

14a) — No overtaking

14b) — No overtaking by trucks

15a) — Stop

15b) — Customs

15c) — Toll

16a) — No parking

16b) — No stopping

16c) — No parking on odd days

16d) — No parking on even days

16e) — Time-limited parking zone

17a) — No motor vehicles except motorcycles

17b) — No motorcycles

17c) — No motor vehicles

17d) — Prohibition of pedestrians, animals, mopeds and bicycles

18a) — No vehicles over 3.5 metres in height

18b) — No vehicles over 2 metres in width

18c) — Prohibited to drive with a distance of less than 70 metres between your vehicle and the vehicle in front

18d) — No vehicles over 10 metres in length

18e) — No cargo vehicles weighing more than 5.5 tonnes

18f) — No vehicles weighing more than 5.5 tonnes

18g) — No vehicles weighing more than 2.4 tonnes per axle

19a) — 50 km/h maximum speed limit

19b) — No audible noise

19c) — Give way to oncoming vehicles

20a) — No pedestrians

20b) — No heavy vehicles

20c) — No vehicles pulling a trailer with 2 or more axles

20h) — No bicycles

20i) — No mopeds

21a) — No vehicles carrying explosives

21b) — No vehicles carrying dangerous water pollutants

21c) — No vehicles carrying dangerous goods or materials under special signage regulations

22a) — Parking zone

22b) — No parking zone

22c) — No parking zone except for loading and unloading

22d) — No stopping zone

22e) — Speed limit zone

22f) — No traffic zone

23a) — End of 50 km/h maximum speed limit

23b) — End of no audible noise

23c) — End of no stopping or parking prohibition

23d) — End of all previously signed prohibitions and restrictions

23e) — End of no overtaking

23f) — End of no overtaking by trucks

23g) — End of time-limited parking zone

== Mandatory signs ==
24a) — Turn left

24b) — Proceed straight

24c) — Turn right ahead

24d) — Proceed straight or turn left

24e) — Turn right

24f) — Turn left ahead

24g) — Proceed straight or turn right

25a) — Pass on the left

25a) — Pass on the right

25b) — Roundabout

25c) — Pass on either side

26a) — 30 km/h minimum speed limit

27a) — Bus lane

27b) — Bicycle path

27d) — Pedestrian footpath

27e) — End of 30 km/ h minimum speed limit

== Information signs ==
28a) — Parking

28b) — Parking is permitted for certain vehicles or vehicles used by public agencies or entities in accordance with the instructions on the sign

28b) — Permit for heavy vehicle parking

29) — Hospital

30) — Dead end

31) — One-way traffic

32) — Priority over oncoming vehicles

33) — Pedestrian crossing

34) — Priority road

35) — Advisory speed limit

36a) — Dedicated lanes for public transport vehicles

37a) — Priority road direction

37b) — Priority road direction

45a) — Lane use sign

45b) — Lane use sign

45c) — Lane use sign

== Other signs ==
S01) — Chevron

S02) — Taxi stand

S03) — Parking time auxiliary

S04) — A time-limited auxiliary sign excluding the loading and unloading of passengers and cargo areas

S05) — Parking time

S05) — Parking time

S05) — Parking time

S06) — Licensed vehicle parking time

S07) — Licensed vehicle exclusion

S08) — Public bus exclusion auxiliary

S09) — Red light is on, you must stop

S10) — Video surveillance

S11) — Violation Detection

S11) — Illegal parking detection

S12) — Speed detection

S13) — Diagonal pedestrian crossing

S14a) — Auxiliary signage for signs, styles 12a and 12b

S14b) — Auxiliary signage for signs, styles 12a and 12b

S16) — Taxi pick-up / drop-off area
