= Yield sign =

Traffic sign warning drivers of a junction

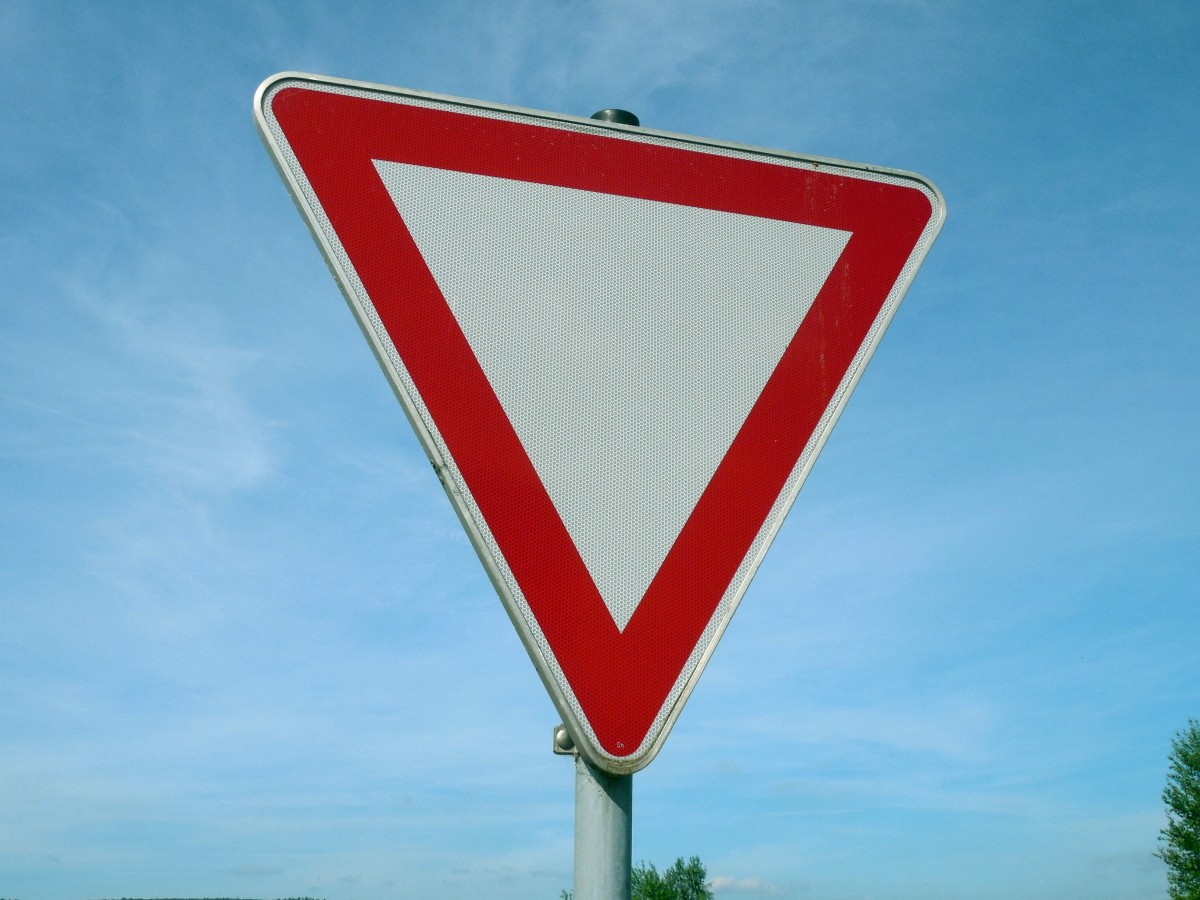
A modern yield sign

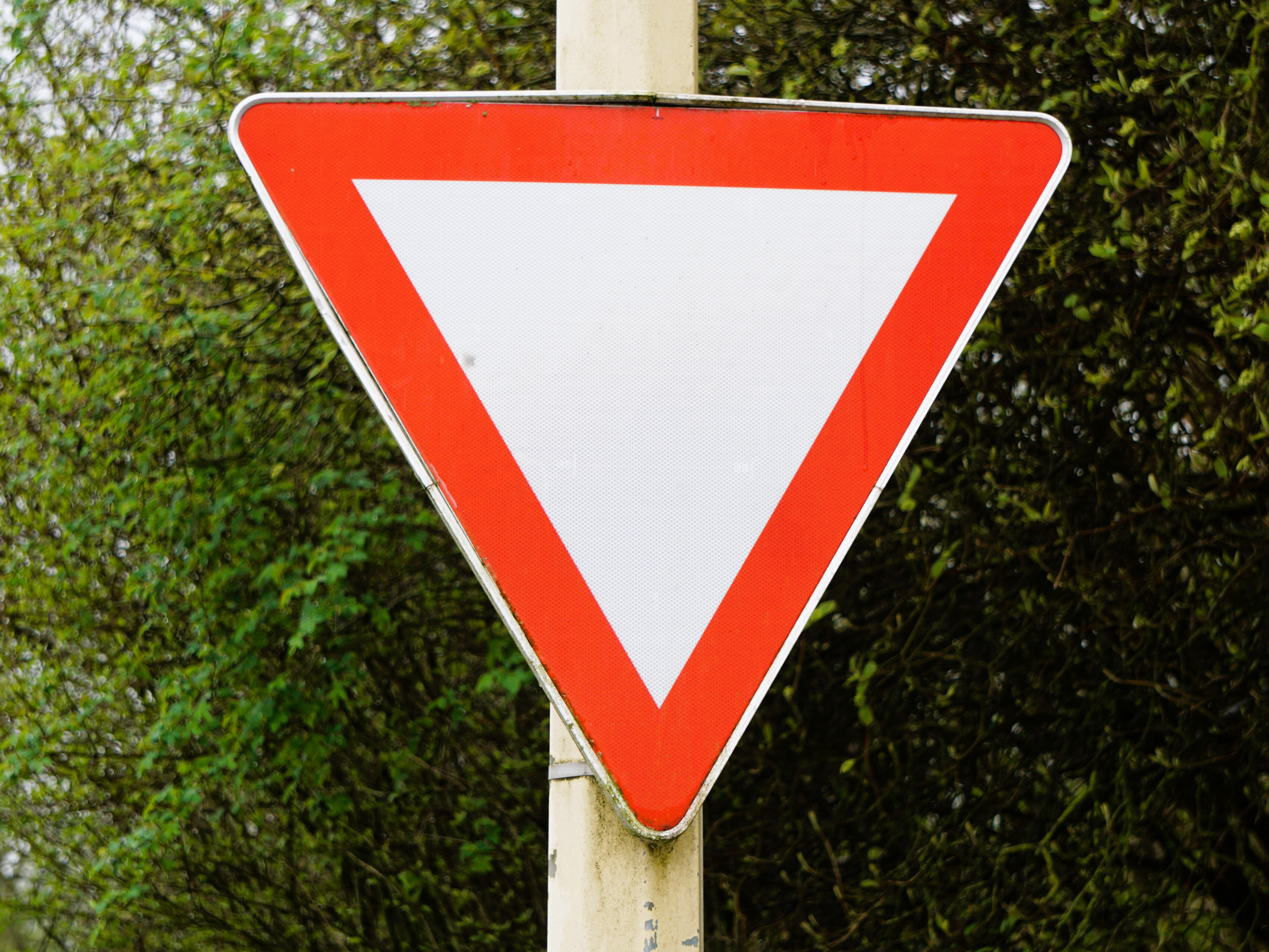
A modern yield sign on a streetlight.

In road transport, a yield or give way sign indicates that merging drivers must prepare to stop if necessary to let a driver on another approach proceed. A driver who stops or slows down to let another vehicle through has yielded the right of way to that vehicle. In contrast, a stop sign requires each driver to stop completely before proceeding, whether or not other traffic is present. Under the Vienna Convention on Road Signs and Signals, the international standard for the modern sign is an inverted equilateral triangle with a red border and either a white or yellow background. Particular regulations regarding appearance, installation, and compliance with the signs vary by some jurisdiction.

== Terminology ==
While give way and yield essentially have the same meaning in this context, many countries have a clear preference of one term over the other. The following table lists which countries and territories use which term. This chart is based on official government usage in the English language and excludes indirect translations from other languages.

=== Areas where give way is used ===
- Anguilla
- Antigua and Barbuda
- Austria
- Australia
- The Bahamas
- Bahrain
- Bangladesh
- Barbados
- Bermuda
- Bhutan
- Brunei
- Cayman Islands
- Cyprus
- Dominica
- Egypt
- Ethiopia
- Falkland Islands
- Fiji
- The Gambia
- Ghana
- Gibraltar
- Grenada
- Guernsey
- Guyana
- Hong Kong SAR
- India
- Iran
- Isle of Man
- Israel
- Jamaica
- Jersey
- Jordan
- Kenya
- Kiribati
- Kuwait
- Malawi
- Malaysia
- Maldives
- Malta
- Mauritius
- Montserrat
- Nauru
- Nepal
- New Zealand
- Nigeria
- Pakistan
- Papua New Guinea
- Philippines
- Qatar
- Rwanda
- Saint Kitts and Nevis
- Saint Lucia
- Saint Vincent and the Grenadines
- Samoa
- Seychelles
- Singapore
- Solomon Islands
- Sri Lanka
- Tanzania
- Thailand
- Tonga
- Trinidad and Tobago
- Turks and Caicos
- Tuvalu
- Uganda
- United Arab Emirates
- United Kingdom
- Vanuatu
- Yemen
- Zambia
- Zimbabwe

=== Areas where yield is used ===
- Belize
- British Virgin Islands
- Canada
- Guam
- Ireland
- Liberia
- Marshall Islands
- Myanmar
- Namibia
- Northern Mariana Islands
- Palau
- Saudi Arabia
- Sierra Leone
- Somalia
- Somaliland
- South Africa
- South Korea
- Taiwan
- United States
- United States Virgin Islands

== History ==
Blue give-way sign as used in Czechoslovakia, 1938

A black triangle (within the standard down-arrow-shape of stop signs) was a symbol of "stop for all vehicles" from about 1925 in Germany. The triangular yield sign was used as early as 1937, when it was introduced in Denmark in red and white (matching the Danish flag), in 1938 when it was codified in Czechoslovakia in a blue-white variant without words, and in 1939 in the Protectorate of Bohemia and Moravia which adopted the current red-white variant. In the United States, the first yield sign was erected in 1950 in Tulsa, Oklahoma, designed by Tulsa police officer Clinton Riggs; Riggs invented only the sign, not the rule, which was already in place. Riggs' original design was shaped like a keystone; later versions bore the shape of an inverted equilateral triangle in common use today. The inverted equilateral triangle was then adopted by the Vienna Convention on Road Signs and Signals as the international standard.

== Country specifics ==
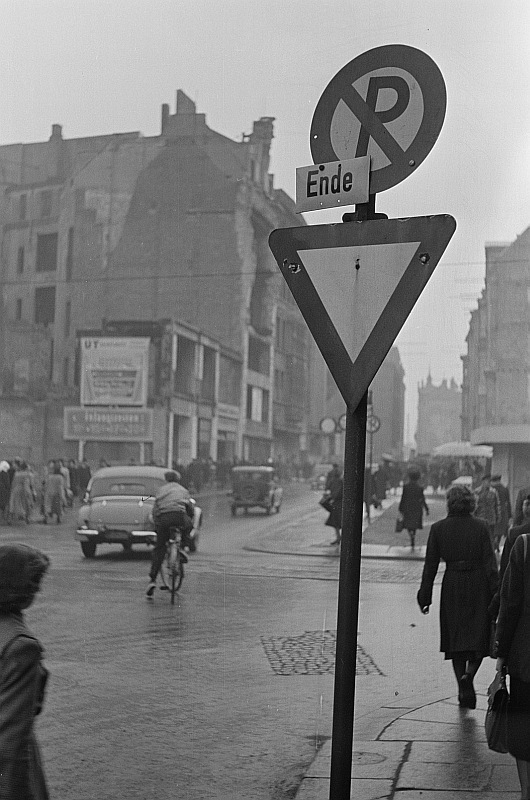
Yield sign Leipzig, East Germany 1951

=== Australia ===
In Australia, the give way sign evolved similarly to its counterpart in the United States. During the 1940s and 1950s, the sign was a yellow circle. In 1960, the sign changed to a red triangle. In the 1980s, the sign adopted its modern design and gained a counterpart for use at roundabouts. On Home Island in the Cocos (Keeling) Islands, give way signs are bilingual in English and Cocos Malay.

Original design (1940's–1960)

Second version (1960–1974)

Modern design since 1974

Cocos (Keeling) Islands design

=== Ireland ===
In Ireland, the yield sign reads yield in most areas, although in Gaeltacht (Irish-speaking) areas the text is géill slí ("yield right of way") instead. Signs erected from 1962 until 1997 read yield right of way, which remains legally permitted. Signs 1956–1962 had a blank white interior.

1956–1962

1962–1997

English-language version (1997 – present)

Irish-language version (1962 – present)

=== New Zealand ===
In New Zealand, the original design also used the keystone shape as in the US but used a black background with a red border. In 1987, the modern design was taken. On sealed roads, the give way sign is always accompanied by a white line painted on the road to clarify the rule to road users even if the sign is obscured or missing.

Original design (1966–1987)

Modern design since 1987

=== South Africa ===
In South Africa, the original version of the sign in red-bordered triangle pointed down in a red circular border. In 1974, the second version using a blue triangle pointed down with a red border. In 1993, the current version using a white triangle pointed down with a red border.

Original design (1951–1974)

Second version (1974–1993)

Modern design since 1993

=== United Arab Emirates ===
In the mid-2010s, the text on the give way sign were removed from the sign, making it blank.

Original design (19??-mid 2010s)

Modern design since the mid-2010s

=== United Kingdom ===
The United Kingdom's give way sign

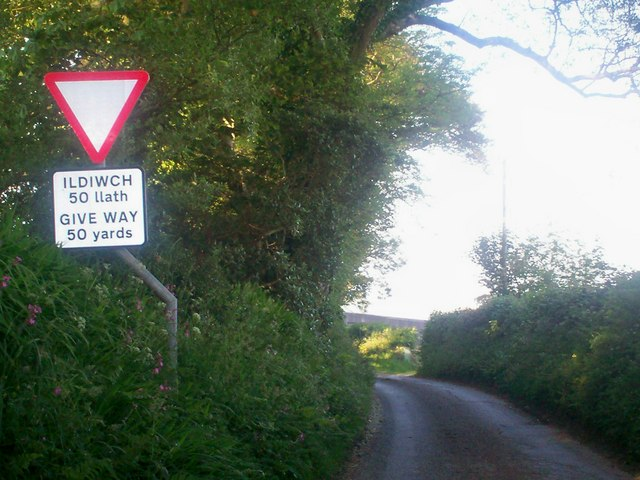
A bilingual sign in Welsh and English, warning of a "give way" junction 50 yards (46 metres) ahead

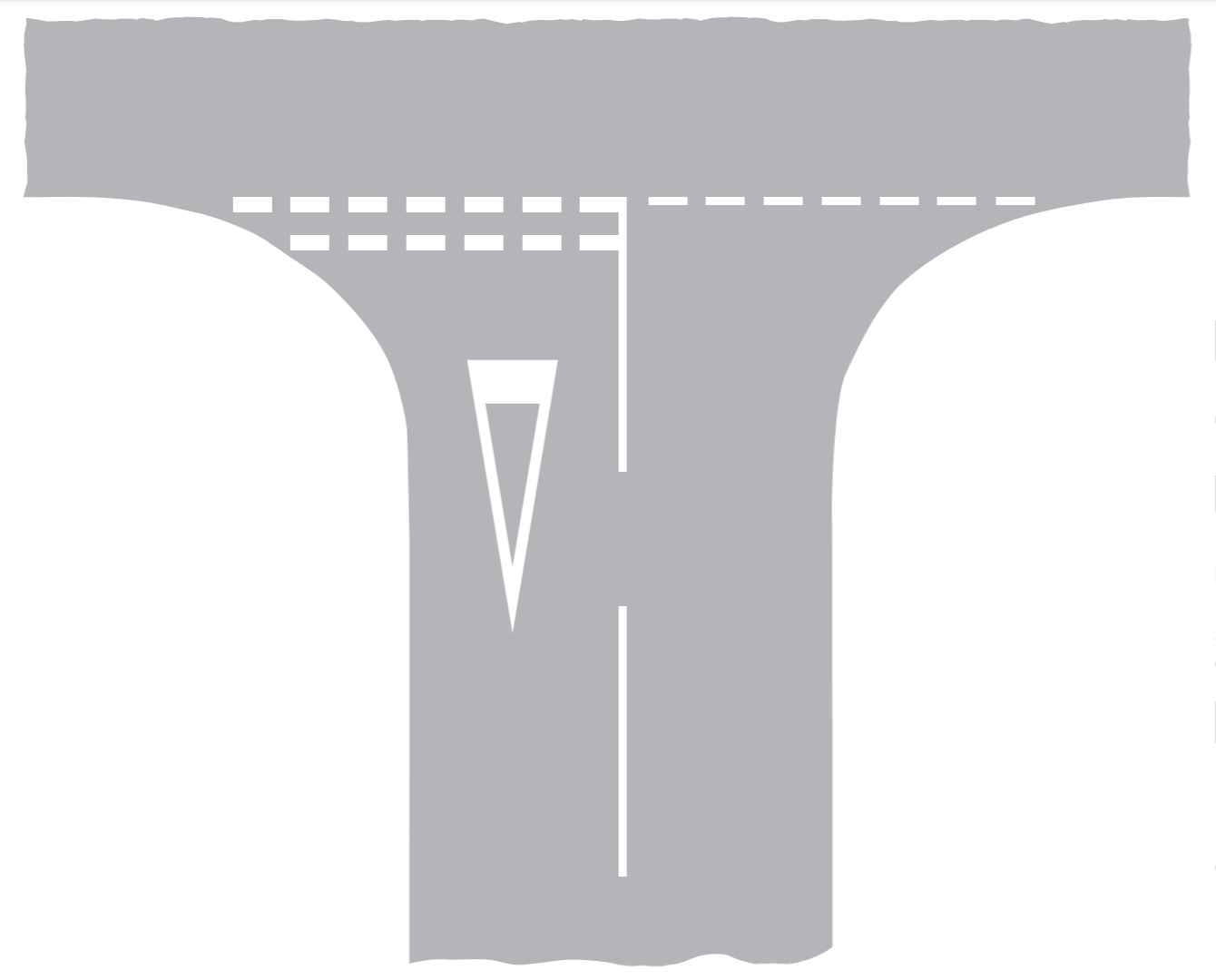
Accompanying road markings for a give way sign as found in the UK

The United Kingdom's Road Traffic Act calls for give way signs and road markings at junctions (crossroads) where the give-way rule is to apply. The road marking accompanying the sign consists of a large inverted triangle painted just before the place to give way, which is marked by broken white lines across the road.

In Wales, some signs bear a bilingual legend: the Welsh ildiwch appears above give way.

In the United Kingdom, a stop or give-way sign may be preceded by an inverted, blank, triangular sign with an advisory placard such as give way 100 yards.

=== United States ===
In the Federal Highway Administration's Manual on Uniform Traffic Control Devices, a yield sign may be warranted

"if engineering judgment indicates that one or more of the following conditions exist:

1. When the ability to see all potentially conflicting traffic is sufficient to allow a road user traveling at the posted speed, the 85th-percentile speed, or the statutory speed to pass through the intersection or to stop in a reasonably safe manner.
2. If controlling move type movement on the entering roadway where acceleration geometry and/or sight distance is not adequate for merging traffic operation.
3. The second crossroad of a divided highway, where the median width at the intersection is 30 ft or greater. In this case, a STOP sign may be installed at the entrance to the first roadway of a divided highway, and a YIELD sign may be installed at the entrance to the second roadway.
4. An intersection where a special problem exists and where engineering judgment indicates the problem to be susceptible to correction by the use of the YIELD sign."

The sign went through several changes from its original design to the sign used today. Originally invented in 1950 and added to the MUTCD in 1954, the sign used the "keystone" shape before adopting the more readily recognized triangular shape. In 1971, the sign evolved into its modern version and changed from yellow to red, paralleling the same change that had earlier been made by STOP signs.

Early design (1950–1954)

Second version (1954–1961)

Third version (1961–1971)

Modern design as agreed to in 1971

=== Zimbabwe ===
In 2016, a white triangle pointed down with a red border of this sign replacing a circular version in red with the word "GIVE WAY" in a yellow triangle.

Original design (1965–2016)

Modern design since 2016

=== Other countries ===
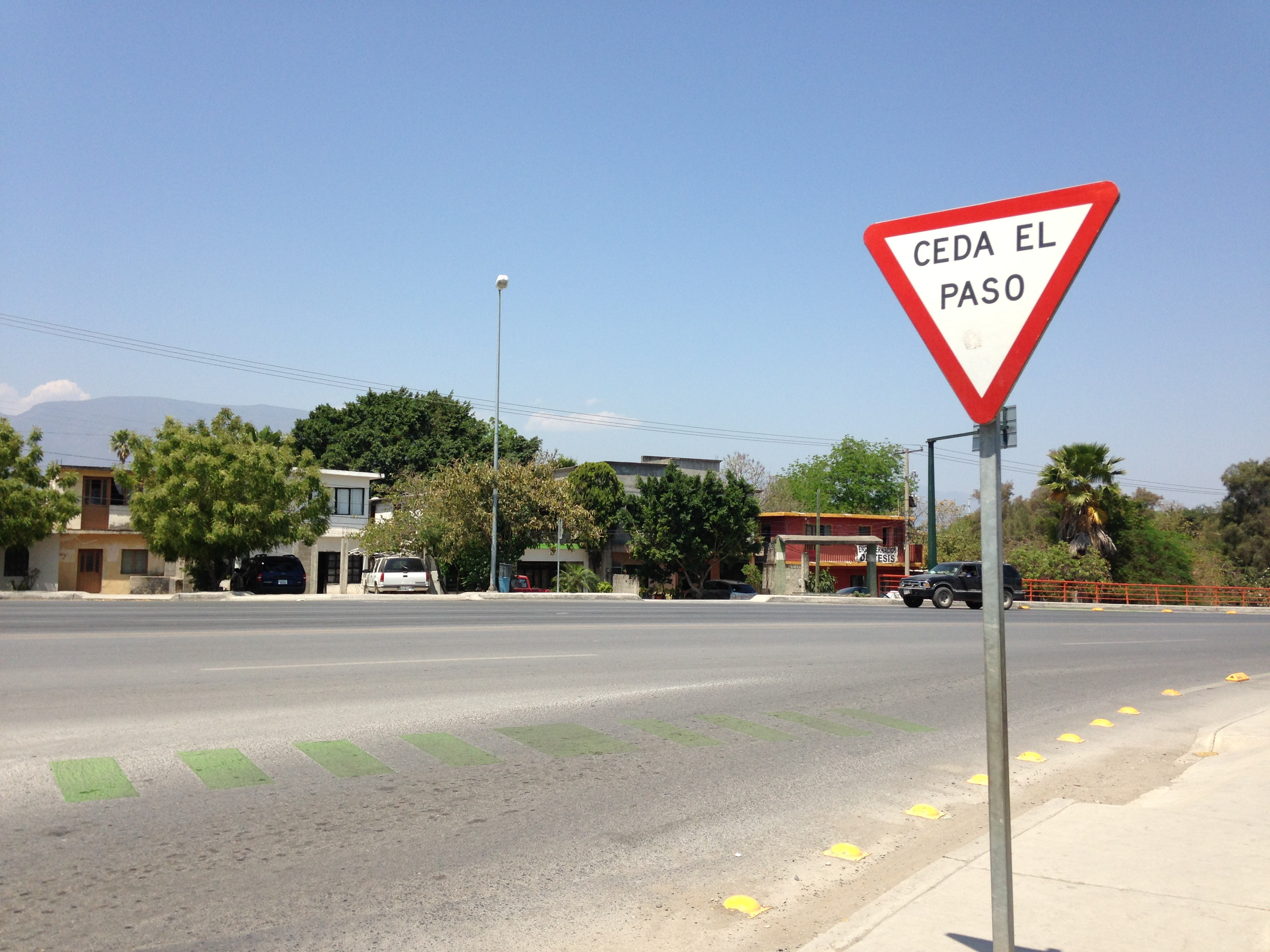
Yield sign in Mexico.

- Most countries around the world use a red and white inverted triangle with no text.
- Cuba, Finland, Greece, Iceland, Kuwait, Nigeria, Poland, Sweden and Vietnam use a red and yellow version of the sign.
- United Kingdom, British Overseas Territories and Crown Dependencies, Bhutan and most Commonwealth nations use a version of the sign that reads give way.
- Dominica, Fiji, Liberia, New Zealand, and Samoa display text in red.
- Singapore places the sign inside a white round square.
- Belize, Brazil, Canada and Romania use a much thicker red border.
- Argentina, Bolivia, Colombia, Costa Rica, Dominican Republic, Ecuador, El Salvador, Mexico, Nicaragua, Panama, Paraguay, Peru, Uruguay and Venezuela use ceda el paso.
- Puerto Rico uses a version of the American sign translated into Spanish which reads ceda.

== Gallery ==
International standard with white background (Note: Most countries around the world use this version.)

International standard with yellow background (Note: Finland, Greece, Iceland, Kuwait, Poland, Sweden, Vietnam.)

Brazil, Canada, Romania

SACU standard (Note: Botswana, Eswatini, Lesotho, Namibia, South Africa. No longer used, the blue background has since been phased out in favour of white.)

=== Signs with text in English ===
Anglophone Africa, Anglophone Caribbean (Lesser Antilles), India, Mauritius, Pakistan, Seychelles, Sri Lanka, United Kingdom

Australia, Guyana, Papua New Guinea, Vanuatu

Dominica

Fiji, New Zealand, Samoa

Ireland

Jamaica

Liberia

Nigeria

Singapore

Tonga

United States

=== Signs with text in Spanish ===
Argentina

Central America

Colombia

Cuba

Ecuador

Mexico

Panama

Peru

United States (Puerto Rico)

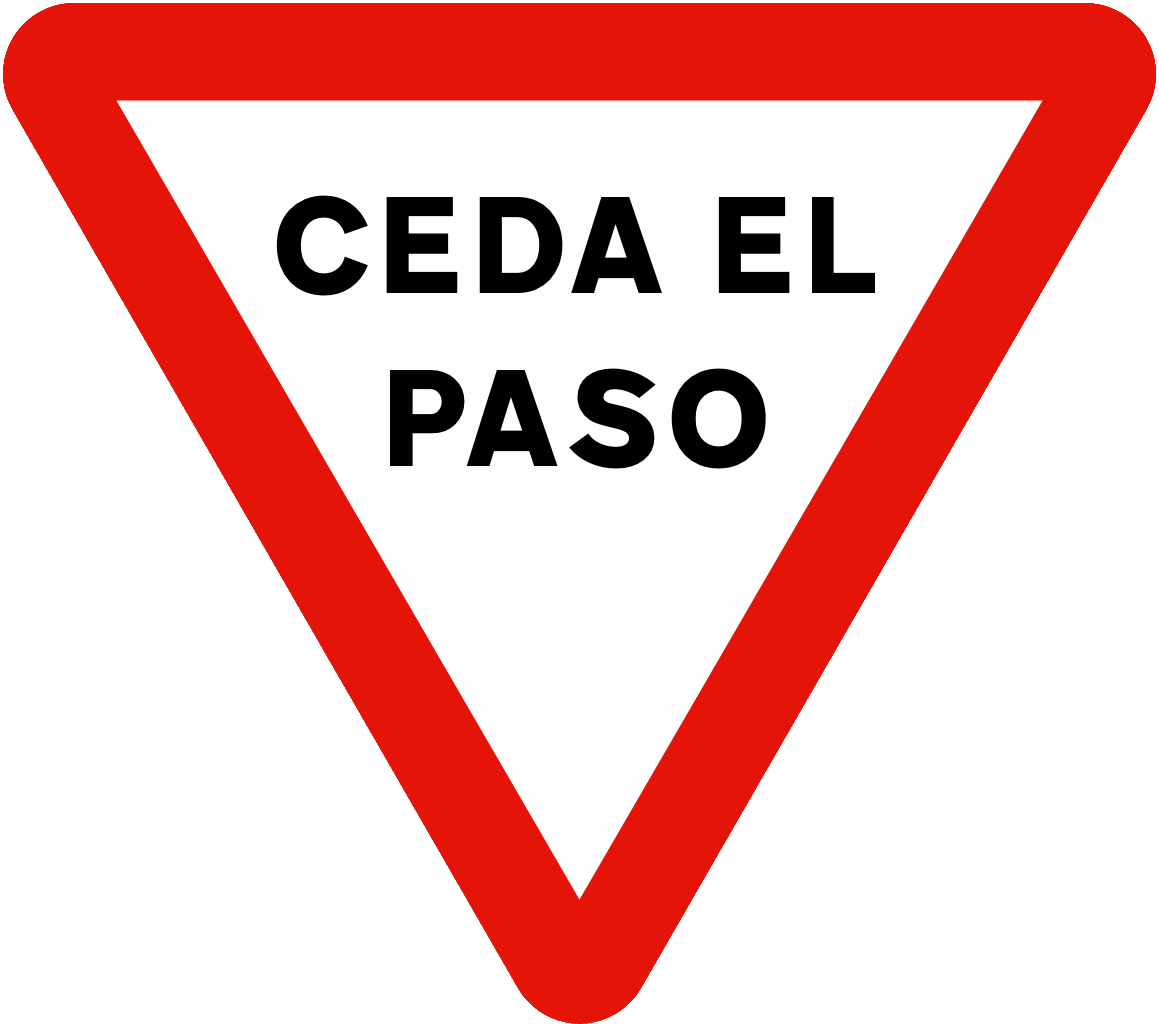
Spain (Note: No longer used, the oldest ones use the French typeface Caractères instead of CCRIGE.)

=== Signs with text in other languages ===
Brunei (Malay)

China (Mandarin)

France, Francophone Africa, Monaco (French)

Haiti (French)

Ireland (Gaeltacht; Irish)

Malaysia (Malay)

Maldives (Maldivian)

Somaliland (Somali)

Taiwan (Mandarin)

Thailand (Thai)

=== Signs with bilingual text ===
Australia (Cocos (Keeling) Islands; English and Cocos Malay)

Bahrain (Arabic and English)

Canada (Ontario; English and French)

Egypt, Qatar, Yemen (Arabic and English)

France (Brittany; French and Breton)

Hong Kong (English and Cantonese)

Kuwait (Arabic and English)

Mauritania and Morocco (Arabic and French)

Philippines (English and Filipino)

South Korea (Korean and English)

Tunisia (Tunisian Arabic and French)

United Arab Emirates (Arabic and English)

Wales (Welsh and English)

== See also ==
- Stop sign
- Traffic sign
