= Road signs in Greece =

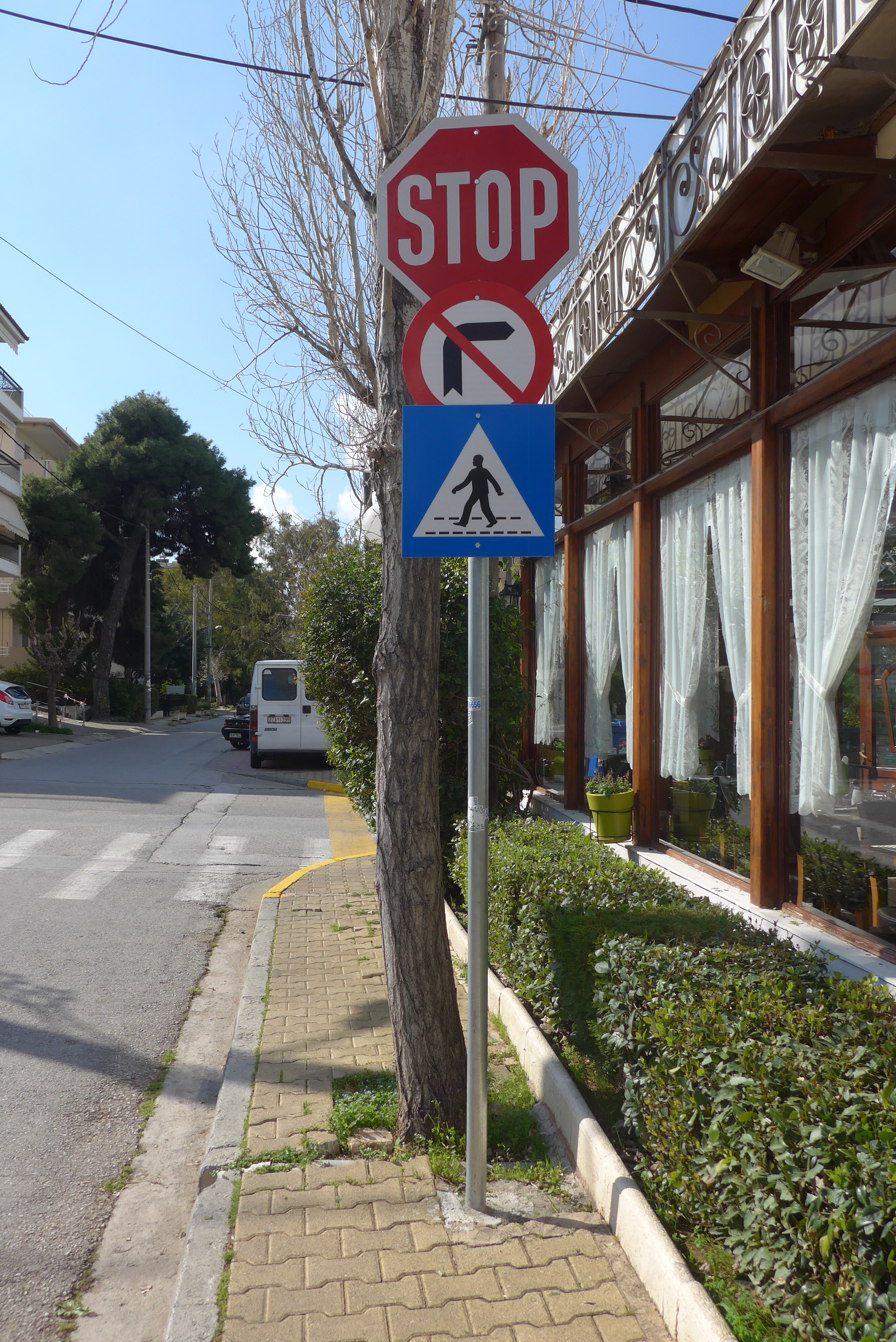
Greek road signs P-2, P-28 and П-21 in Pefki, Attica.

Road signs in Greece are regulated by the Ministry of Transport and the Hellenic Traffic Police, according to the Greek Highway Code (Κ.Ο.Κ., Greek: Κώδικας Οδικής Κυκλοφορίας).

Signs follow the general European conventions concerning the use of shape and colour, for every sign category. Signs indicating dangers are triangular with a red border, those giving orders are almost all circular (white on blue for mandatory instructions, black on white with a red border for prohibitions), and those providing information are rectangular. Most signs use pictograms to convey their particular meaning.

As is customary in European countries, all signs are partly or fully reflectorized or are provided with their own night-time illumination. Signs used for temporary regulations may have an bright orange background colour.

Greek road signs depict people with realistic (as opposed to stylized) silhouettes.

Greece acceded to the Vienna Convention on Road Signs and Signals on December 18, 1986.

== History ==
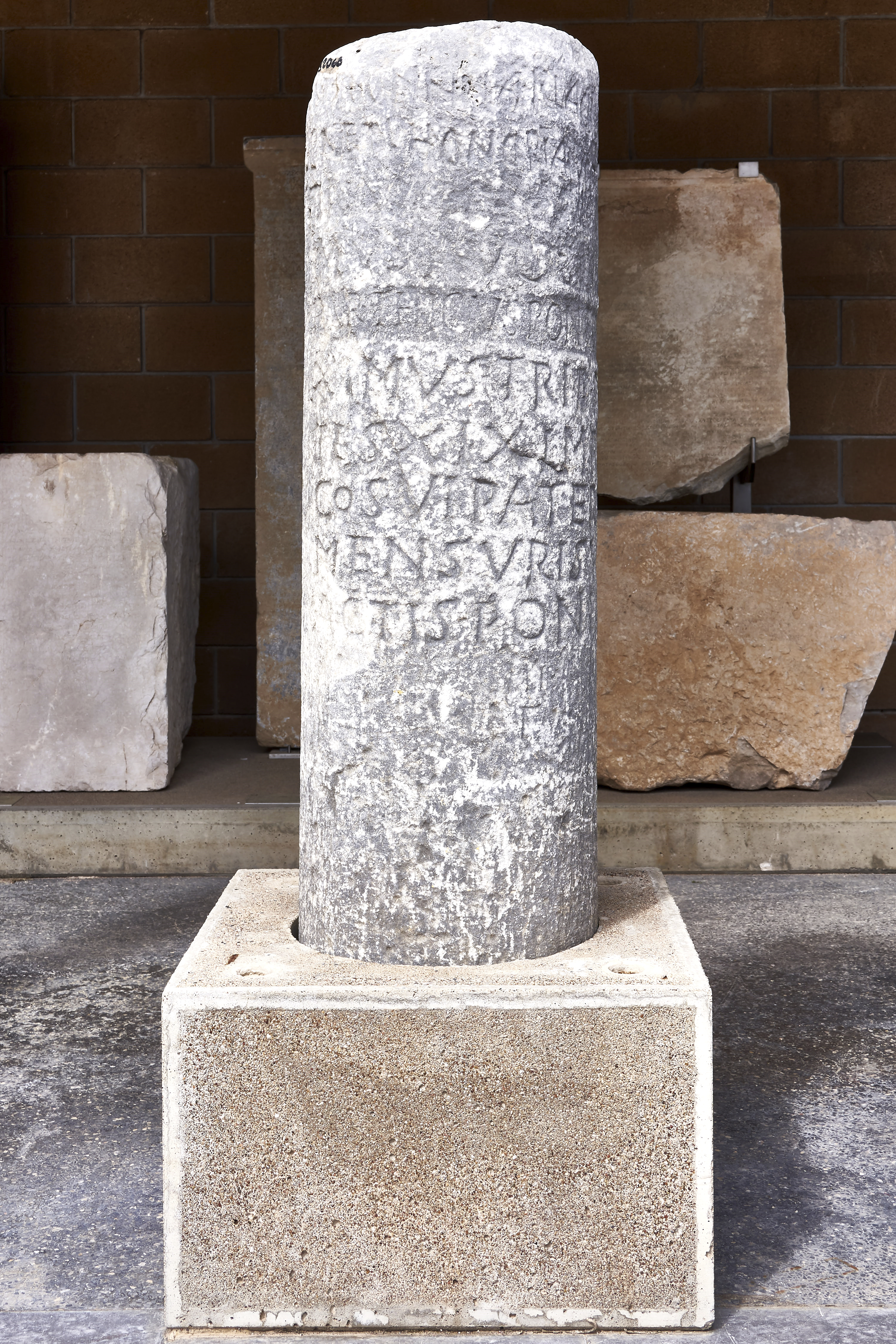
Roman milestone (milliario) from Boeotia (2 century BC)

The history of road signaling in Greece dates back to Antiquity. The first road signaling included marble columns with the head of Hermes, protector of the wayfarers. Those signs were known as ἑρμαῖ ("Hermai"). There were also milestones for measuring street length in stadions. Similar columns were also used in Roman times, but had miles as a unit of measurement.

The first road signage on Greek roads with contemporary signs was made in 1924 by ELPA (Elliniki Leschi Periigiseon kai Aftokinitou, lit. translated: Hellenic Club of Tours and Car), which took over the road network's signage until 1957, when it was taken over by the state. The signs were subject to the provisions of the Geneva Protocol on Road Signs and Signals.

On July 25, 1962, and with Government Gazette A '110/62, it was announced in paragraph 1 of article 14 that "by joint decisions, issued by the Ministers of Transport, Public Works and Interior, all matters relating to the road signs, road markings, the type of signals, the characteristics of the road signage and the manner of its application shall be defined," while in paragraph 2 of the same article that "the provisions of the International Geneva Protocol on Road Signs and Signals of September 1949, with its supplements, are temporarily valid and up-to the apply of the referenced of the paragraph 1 of this article."

Finally, on July 6, 1974, 12 years after the initial announcements and with the Government Gazette B '676/74, the first serious signaling standards were established, which are still valid today. It was the first time that sign diagrams were included in a Government Gazette. Since the publication of the relevant Government Gazette, the "provisions of paragraph 2 of article 14 of Law 4332/62 "on the ratification of the Road Traffic Code" have been abolished. However, within five years of its publication, six of the old signs from the Geneva Protocol were still valid, as "temporarily preserved signs."

The ΠΤΠ (Standard Technical Specifications, Greek: Πρότυπες Τεχνικές Προδιαγραφές) Σ301-75, and Σ301-302-75 (ΦΕΚ 99 B '/ 1976) established the quality of the aluminum of the sign, the ΠΤΠ of ΦΕΚ 1061 B' / 1980, as corrected by the order BM5 / 0/40229 / 27-10-1980 the support poles, the ΠΤΠ of the ΦΕΚ 589 / Β / 1980 the signalling of performed intercity road works, the ΠΤΠ of the ΦΕΚ 121 / Β / 1983 the signalling of performed city road works, the ΠΤΠ Σ310 and Σ311 the membranes of the signs, the technical specification ΔΚ8 of ΕΗ3 / 0/107 / 22-1-1976 the poles for eccentric plates and the Greek standard ΕΛΟΤ- 743/87 the conversion of the Greek alphabet into Latin characters for the information signs, the Technical Description Δ3γ / 0/15/11-Ω / 28-2-1991 the illuminated signs, the Directive of ΔΜΕΟε / οικ / 720 / 13-11-92 the issues of road signs that are not covered by the previous specifications, the Community Directives and the corresponding Circulars of the Ministry TEM and the KME and ΤΣΥ the signaling and the types of safety equipment on the motorways and the relevant legislation of the Highway Code for advertisement signs. At the same time, in 1976 and 1981, the Katharevousa and the Polytonic System, respectively, were abolished and replaced by new dialects and writing systems (Dimotiki and Monotonic). The Road Design Studies Instructions (OMOE) for the Motorway Signs and Signals (ΚΣΑ) and for the Marking of Performed Works (ΣΕΕΟ), concern the signs for these issues. (ΦΕΚ 905/2011 / B ') Finally, many recent laws (mainly laws of the Highway Code), have introduced new signs of various categories, which mainly concern vehicles that appear for the first time (e.g. trams or electric cars).

== Design ==
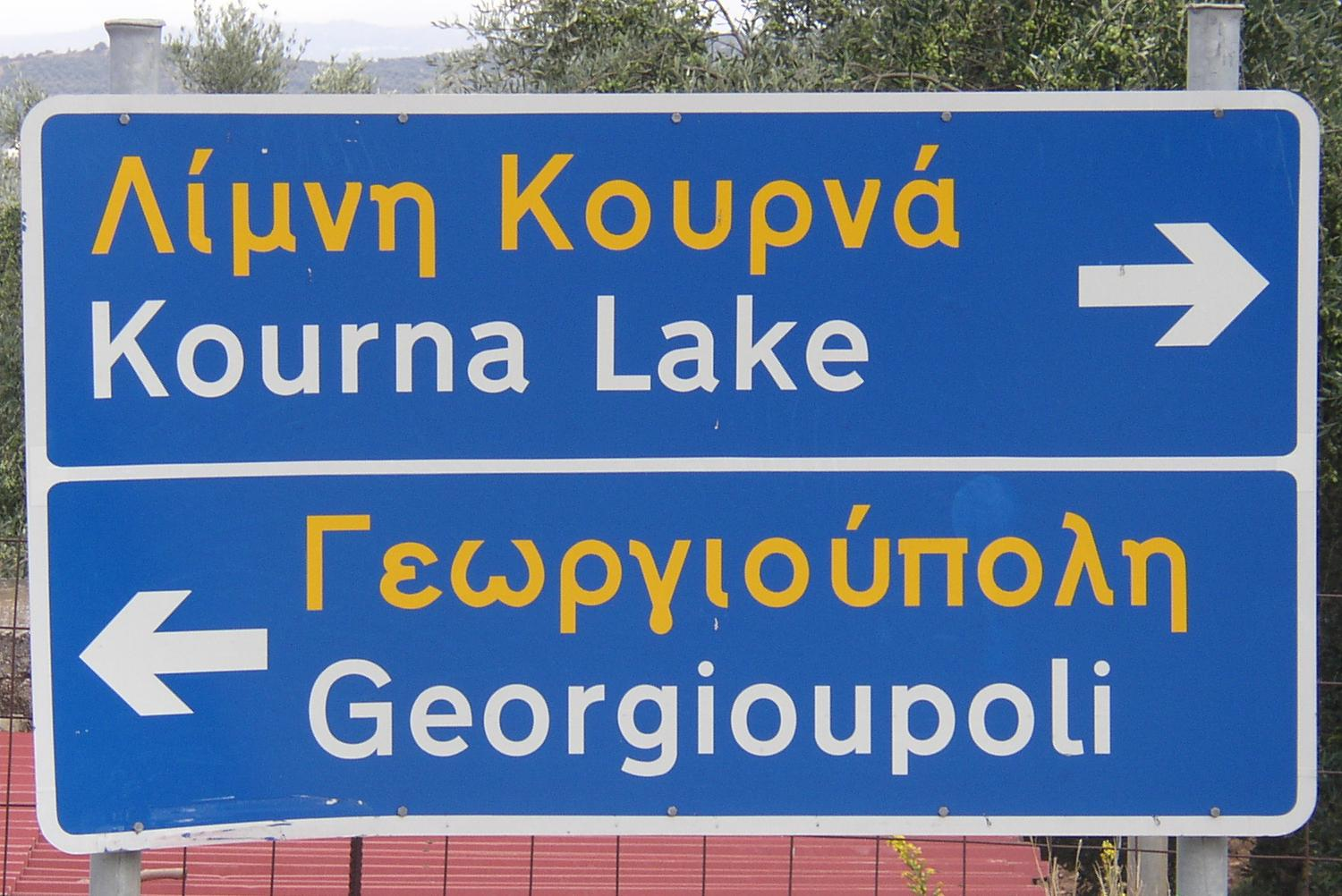
National road sign near Georgioupoli, Chania

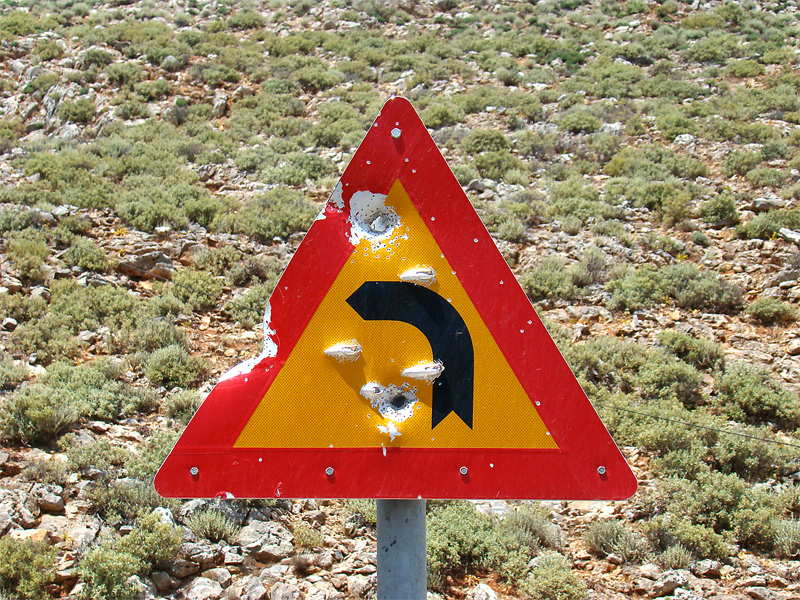
Curve to the left warning sign between Chora Sfakion and Aradena, Chania

=== Shape and colour ===
Warning signs mostly have a triangular shape. Their borders are red and their background is yellow, with pictograms being black. Prohibitory and mandatory signs are mostly round in shape. Prohibitory signs have red borders and a white background, with pictograms being black. For mandatory signs, their background is blue and pictograms are white.

=== Font ===
The font on the signs since 1974 is Transport, which also appears on the signs of other European countries. On motorways, the DIN 1451 font is used.

=== Language ===
Signs in Greece are displayed in two languages: Greek (Greek alphabet) and English (Latin alphabet). Previously, the signs were in the Katharevousa form of the Greek language (using the polytonic system), until 1976 and 1981, when it was replaced by Demotic Greek (using the monotonic system).

=== Retroreflection ===
Signs during the night are either:

- Internally illuminated – that is, of suitable translucent materials, illuminated by internal illumination systems. The application of these signs is restricted mainly to urban areas and to specific high-risk interurban networks.
- Externally illuminated – that is, they are illuminated by lamps facing them. These signs are applied at places where the light beam of cars is difficult to reach, such as the road sign gantries.
- With reflective materials – that is, part or all of which is of a suitable reflective film. They may not be reflective (at roads that are lit at night), semi-reflective (only symbols are reflective) or fully reflective (except symbols).

Finally, there are fluorescent reflective membranes, used in special circumstances, as a backdrop for school signs or signs indicating significant hazards.

=== Material ===
According to ΦΕΚ 99/76 B, the plates are made of aluminum sheets, "of alloy type AIMg 2 according to DIN 1725 Blatt I" or aluminum "type SIC 114 according to BS 873: PART 1: 1970 > 3 mm." To prevent corrosion, "they are calculated with a safety factor in terms of their mechanical strength, above 1.61."

=== Poles ===
According to ΦΕΚ 1061 B '/ 1980, the poles of the signs are metal and are made of steel pipes or pipes made of aluminum alloy. The steel pipes have Carbon (0.17% to 0.30%), Sulfur (0.050% to 0.060%) and Phosphorus (0.050% to 0.060%), while the aluminum pipes, which are made of type 6005-A aluminum alloy according to the French AFNOR specification, silicon (0.60% to 0.90%), iron (0.35% maximum), manganese (0.50% maximum) and magnesium (0.40% to 0.70%) and their height is about 2.50 to 3.30 meters (8.2 to 10.8 ft). The poles are usually made of steel, in the form of hollow beams, or of lightly reinforced concrete in circular sections. Two or more poles can also be used on larger signs.

=== Dimensions ===
The signs have the following sizes:

1. Small – the circular ones have a diameter of 450 millimeters (18 in), the equilateral triangular sides 600 millimeters (24 in), the informative ones with letters height 100 millimeters (3.9 in) and the octagonal STOP diameter 600 millimeters (24 in). They are found mainly in villages, small towns, private and rural roads, as well as in private areas. They are rarely placed on provincial roads, and if approved by the Competent Service.
2. Medium – the circular ones have a diameter of 650 millimeters (26 in), the equilateral triangular sides 600 millimeters (24 in), the informative ones with letters height 100 millimeters (3.9 in) and the octagonal STOP diameter 900 millimeters (35 in). They are found mainly in large cities and on provincial and / or national roads.
3. Large – the circular ones have a diameter of 900 millimeters (35 in), the equilateral triangular sides 1,200 millimeters (47 in), the informative ones in letters height 200 millimeters (7.9 in) and the octagonal STOP diameter 1,200 millimeters (47 in). They are found mainly on expressways.

On motorways, the size of the sign and the letters, as well as the font, require special treatment due to the different driving requirements on these roads.

== Categorization ==
All signs are identified by a Greek capital letter (for each category) and a number. Signs that indicate the same meaning but in a different direction have the same capital letter and number but are additionally differentiated by a lowercase letter (e.g. α, β, γ, δ, ... or α for left and δ for right).

=== Warning signs (ΚΟΚ series Κ) ===
Κ-1α
Curve (left)

Κ-1δ
Curve (right)

Κ-2α
Double curve (left)

Κ-2δ
Double curve (right)

Κ-3
Steep hill downwards

Κ-4
Steep hill upwards

Κ-5
Road narrows

K-6α
Road narrows on left

K-6δ
Road narrows on right

K-7
Moveable bridge

K-8
Quayside or river bank

K-9
Uneven road

K-10
Speed refluction bumps

K-11
Dip

K-12
Slippery road

K-13
Loose chippings

K-14
Rockfall from right

K-14
Rockfall from left

K-15
Pedestrian crossing ahead

K-16
Children

K-17
Cyclists

K-18
Domesticated animals

K-19
Wild animals

K-20
Roadworks

K-21
Traffic signals

K-22
Low-flying aircraft

K-23
Crosswind

K-23
Crosswind

K-24
Two-way traffic

K-25
Other dangers

K-26
Intersection with priority to the right

K-27
Intersection with priority

K-28α
Junction with a side-road from the left

K-28δ
Junction with a side-road from the right

K-29α
Merging traffic from the left

K-29δ
Merging traffic from the right

K-30
Roundabout ahead

K-31
Level crossing with a barrier or gate

K-32
Level crossing without a barrier or gate

K-33
Distance to level crossing (farthest)

K-34
Distance to level crossing (middle)

K-35
Distance to level crossing (closest)

K-36
Single-track railway

K-37
Multi-track railway

K-38α
Dangerous verges on the left

K-38δ
Dangerous verges on the right

K-39
Traffic queues

K-40
Tunnel ahead

K-41
Tramway

K-42
Fog

K-42α
Fog

K-43
Parallel pedestrian and cyclist crossing

K-44
Common pedestrian and cyclist crossing

Κ-45α
Steep hill downwards for cyclist

Κ-45δ
Steep hill upwards for cyclist

=== Regulatory signs (ΚΟΚ series Ρ) ===
Ρ-1
Give way

Ρ-2
Stop

Ρ-3
Priority road

Ρ-4
End of priority road

Ρ-5
Give priority to oncoming traffic

Ρ-6
Priority over oncoming traffic

Ρ-7
No entry

Ρ-8
Road closed for all vehicles

Ρ-9
No motor vehicles with 4 or more wheels

Ρ-10
No motorcycles

Ρ-11
No bicycles

Ρ-12
No mopeds

Ρ-13
No lorries

Ρ-14
No vehicles with a trailer

Ρ-15
No pedestrians

Ρ-16
No animal-drawn vehicles

Ρ-17
No handcarts

Ρ-18
No agricultural machineries

Ρ-19
No motor vehicles

Ρ-20
No motor vehicles and animal-drawn vehicles

Ρ-21
No vehicles over width shown (e.g. 2m)

Ρ-22
No vehicles over height shown (e.g. 3.5m)

Ρ-23
No vehicles over tonnes shown (e.g. 5t)

Ρ-24
No vehicles over axle weight limit (e.g. 2t)

Ρ-25
No vehicles over length shown (e.g. 10m)

Ρ-26
Minimum distance (e.g. 70m)

Ρ-27
No left turn

Ρ-28
No right turn

Ρ-29
No U-turn

Ρ-30
No overtaking

Ρ-31
No overtaking from vehicles over 3.5 tonnes

Ρ-32α
Maximum speed (10 km/h)

Ρ-32β
Maximum speed (20 km/h)

Ρ-32γ
Maximum speed (30 km/h)

Ρ-32δ
Maximum speed (40 km/h)

Ρ-32ε
Maximum speed (50 km/h)

Ρ-32στ
Maximum speed (60 km/h)

Ρ-32ζ
Maximum speed (70 km/h)

Ρ-32η
Maximum speed (80 km/h)

Ρ-32θ
Maximum speed (90 km/h)

Ρ-32ι
Maximum speed (100 km/h)

Ρ-32κ
Maximum speed (110 km/h)

Ρ-32λ
Maximum speed (120 km/h)

Ρ-32μ
Maximum speed (130 km/h)

Ρ-33
No use of horns

Ρ-34
Customs control

Ρ-35
Toll road

Ρ-36
End of restriction

Ρ-37
End of maximum speed (e.g. 60 km/h)

Ρ-38
End of no overtaking

Ρ-39
No parking

Ρ-40
No parking and stopping

Ρ-41
No parking on odd months

Ρ-42
No parking on even months

Ρ-43
No parking zone

Ρ-44
End of no parking zone

Ρ-45
No vehicles carrying explosives or flammable goods

Ρ-46
No vehicles carrying goods which could pollute water

Ρ-47
Turn left

Ρ-48
Turn right

Ρ-49
Keep straight

Ρ-50
Turn left or right ahead

Ρ-50α
Turn left ahead

Ρ-50δ
Turn right ahead

Ρ-51α
Turn straight or left ahead

Ρ-51δ
Turn straight or right ahead

Ρ-52
Cross either on left or right

Ρ-52α
Keep left

Ρ-52δ
Keep right

Ρ-53
Roundabout

Ρ-54
Bicycle lane

Ρ-55
Pedestrian lane (footpath)

Ρ-56
Bridleway

Ρ-57
Minimum speed (e.g. 30 km/h)

Ρ-58
End of minimum speed (e.g. 30 km/h)

Ρ-59
Snow chains compulsory

Ρ-60
Maximum speed zone (e.g. 50 km/h)

Ρ-61
End of maximum speed zone (e.g. 50 km/h)

Ρ-62
End of no overtaking from vehicles over 3.5 tonnes

Ρ-63
No trailers over tonnes shown (e.g. 3t)

Ρ-64
No vehicles carrying hazardous goods

Ρ-65
Segregated pedestrian and bicycle path

Ρ-65
Segregated pedestrian and bicycle path

Ρ-66
Shared path from pedestrians and bicycles

Ρ-66α
Shared path from bicycles and vehicles

Ρ-67
Exclusive bus or trolleybus crossing

Ρ-67α
Exclusive passage of buses, trolleybuses and bicycles

Ρ-68
End of exclusive bus or trolleybus crossing

Ρ-68α
End of exclusive passage of buses, trolleybuses and bicycles

Ρ-69
Controlled parking

Ρ-70
Parking of a certain category of vehicles (e.g. TAXI)

Ρ-71
Parking exclusively for vehicles of people with disabilities

Ρ-72
Parking exclusively for vehicles of people with disabilities, with a special license

Ρ-73α
Vehicles carrying hazardous goods should turn left

Ρ-73δ
Vehicles carrying hazardous goods should turn right

Ρ-74α
Vehicles carrying hazardous goods should turn left

Ρ-74δ
Vehicles carrying hazardous goods should turn right

Ρ-75
Attention to vehicles carrying goods which could pollute water

Ρ-76
Exclusive tram crossing

Ρ-77
End of exclusive tram crossing

=== Information signs (ΚΟΚ series Π) ===
Π-1
Directions on an expressway

Π-2
Directions on an expressway

Π-3
Primary or secondary road direction

Π-3α
Direction to urban area

Π-3β
Direction to tourist attraction

Π-4
Dead end on right

Π-5
Dead end on left

Π-6
Alternative direction

Π-7
Multi-lane lane warning sign at an intersection

Π-8α
Primary or secondary road direction

Π-8β
Primary or secondary road direction

Π-8γ
Primary or secondary road direction

Π-8δ
Direction to tourist attraction

Π-9
Primary or secondary road direction

Π-10
Direction to the airport

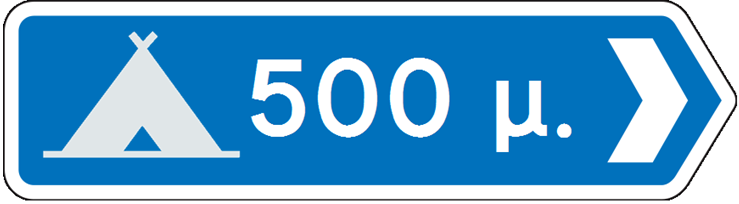
Π-11

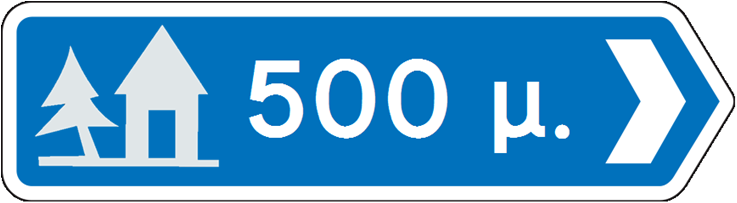
Π-12

Π-13 National road number

Π-14
E-road number

Π-15
Street mileage

Π-16
Street mileage

Π-17
Beginning of residential area

Π-18
End of residential area

Π-19
Toponymy

Π-21
Pedestrian crossing

Π-21α
Cyclist crossing

Π-21β
Parallel pedestrian and cyclist crossing

Π-21γ
Pedestrian and cyclist crossing

Π-22
Hospital

Π-23
One-way street

Π-24
One-way street (right)

Π-24
One-way street (left)

Π-25
Dead end

Π-26
Expressway

Π-26α
End of expressway

Π-27
Motorway

Π-27α
End of motorway

Π-28
Bus or trolleybus stop

Π-28α
Railway station

Π-29
Information about road condition of passes

Π-30
Snow chains or snow tyres are recommended (used on Π-29)

Π-31
Parking place

Π-31α
Parking area

Π-31β
End of parking area

Π-31γ
Direction to show parking area

Π-31δ
Bicycle parking

Π-32
First aid

Π-33
Repairs

Π-34
Telephone

Π-35
Petrol station

Π-36
Hotel or motel

Π-37
Restaurant

Π-38
Refreshments

Π-39
Picnic site

Π-40
Hiking trail

Π-41
Camping site

Π-42
Caravan site

Π-43
Camping and caravan site

Π-44
Youth hostel

Π-45
Information

Π-46
Bathing

Π-47
Lavatory

Π-48
Radio station for road and traffic information

Π-49
Tunnel

Π-50
Airport

Π-51
Helicopter

Π-52
Cable car

Π-53
Seaport

Π-54
Tourist port

Π-55
Port for hydrofoils

Π-56
Seaport for ferry

Π-57
Police

Π-58
Urban area

Π-59
End of urban area

Π-60
Disabled people

Π-61
Pedestrian overpass

Π-62
Pedestrian underpass

Π-63
Pedestrian ramp

Π-64
Advisory speed limit

Π-65
General speed limits

Π-66

Π-67

Π-68

Π-68

Π-69

Π-69

Π-69α

Π-70

Π-70α

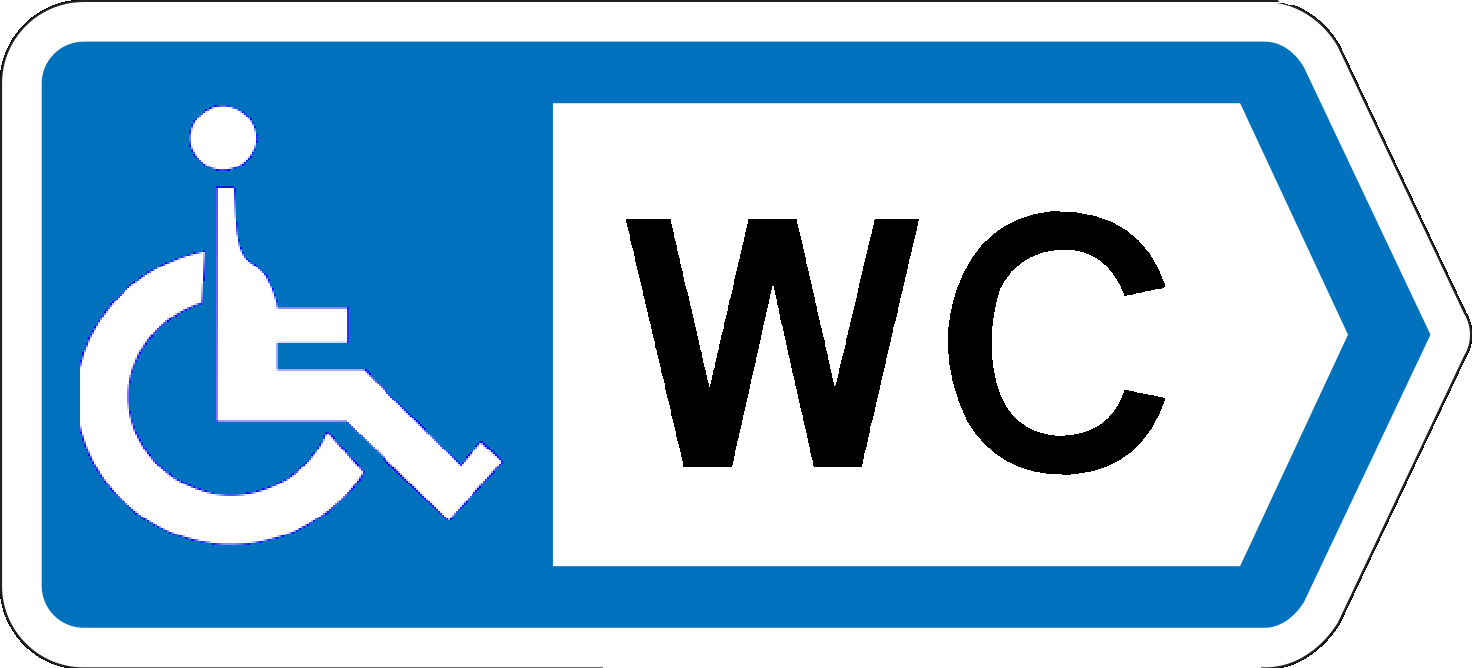
Π-71
Lavatory for people with disabilities

Π-72

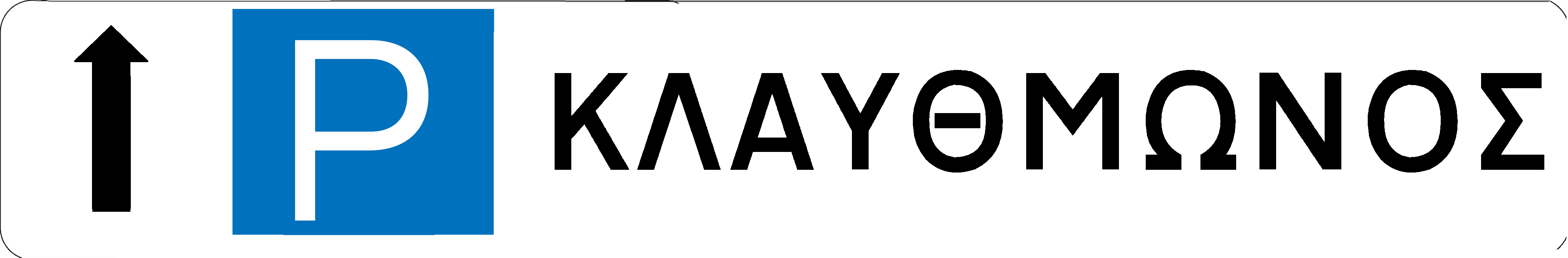
Π-73

Π-74
Obstacle marker (left)

Π-74
Obstacle marker (right)

Π-75
Sharp bend, left

Π-75
Sharp bend, right

Π-76
Barrier marker

Π-76
Barrier marker

Π-77
Obstacle marker (keep right)

Π-78
Obstacle marker (keep left)

Π-79
Cross either on left or right

Π-80
Interchange

Π-81

Π-82

Π-83

Π-84

Π-85

Π-86
Exit

Π-89

Π-90α
Distance marker before an exit (300 m)

Π-90β
Distance marker before an exit (200 m)

Π-90γ
Distance marker before an exit (100 m)

Π-91
Vehicles that carry more than a certain amount of explosives or flammable substances should use the exit

Π-92
Traffic calming zone

Π-92α
End of traffic calming zone

Π-93
Pedestrian crossing patrol

Π-94
Stopping and parking is prohibited, owner's vehicle will be towed

Π-94
Stopping and parking is prohibited, owner's vehicle will be towed

Π-95
Tram on road

Π-97

Π-98

Π-98α

Π-133
Fire extinguisher

Π-134α
Emergency layby

Π-134β
Emergency layby

=== Additional signs (ΚΟΚ series Πρ) ===
Additional signs are rectangular with a black border on a white background with a black pictogram and are always combined with other road signs.

Πρ-1
100 m ahead

Πρ-2
Length of a danger

Πρ-4α
Beginning of...

Πρ-4β
Continual of...

Πρ-4γ
End of...

Πρ-4δ
ΑμεΑ vehicles

Πρ-4ε
No ΑμεΑ vehicles

Πρ-5
Risk of snow/ice

Πρ-6
Rain

Πρ-7
Direction of priority road

Πρ-8
Direction of priority road

Πρ-9
Direction of priority road

Πρ-10
Direction of priority road

Πρ-11
Direction of priority road

Πρ-12
Direction of priority road

Πρ-13
Direction of priority road

Πρ-14α
Hard curve (left)

Πρ-14δ
Hard curve (right)

Πρ-15α

Πρ-15δ

Πρ-16α
Animal-drawn vehicle

Πρ-16β
Handcart

Πρ-16γ
Bicycle

Πρ-16δ
Moped

Πρ-16ε
Motorcycle

Πρ-16στ
Passenger vehicle

Πρ-16ζ
Passenger vehicle with a trailer

Πρ-16η
Agricultural machinery

Πρ-16θ
Bus or trolleybus

Πρ-16ι
Lorry

Πρ-16ια
Semi-trailer truck

Πρ-16ιβ
Semi-trailer truck with a trailer

Πρ-16ιγ
Lorry with a trailer

Πρ-16ιδ
Vehicle carrying explosives or flammable goods

Πρ-16ιε
Tram

Πρ-17 (α-ιδ)
No bus or trolleybus

Πρ-18α
TAXI

Πρ-18β
Except TAXI

=== Temporary signs ===
Temporary signs typically consist of a traffic sign placed on an orange background.

Κ-1α
Curve (left)

Κ-1δ
Curve (right)

Κ-2α
Double curve (left)

Κ-2δ
Double curve (right)

Κ-5
Road narrows

Κ-6α
Road narrows on left

Κ-6δ
Road narrows on right

Κ-9
Uneven road

Κ-10
Humps

Κ-11
Dip

Κ-12
Slippery road

Κ-13
Loose chippings

Κ-15
Pedestrian crossing ahead

Κ-16
Children

Κ-20
Roadworks

Κ-21
Traffic signals

Κ-24
Two-way traffic

Κ-25
Other danger

Κ-26
Intersection with priority to the right

Κ-27
Intersection with priority

Κ-28α
Junction with a side-road from the left

Κ-28δ
Junction with a side-road from the right

Κ-29α
Merging traffic from the left

Κ-29δ
Merging traffic from the right

Κ-30
Roundabout ahead

Κ-42
Fog

Ρ-1
Give way

Ρ-2
Stop

Ρ-5
Give priority to oncoming traffic

Ρ-6
Priority over oncoming traffic

Ρ-7
No entry

Ρ-8
Road closed for all vehicles

Ρ-8
Road closed for all vehicles except for construction site vehicles

Ρ-13
No lorries

Ρ-14
No vehicles with a trailer

Ρ-15
No pedestrians

Ρ-27
No left turn

Ρ-28
No right turn

Ρ-29
No U-turn

Ρ-30
No overtaking

Ρ-31
No overtaking from vehicles over 3.5 tonnes

Ρ-32α
Maximum speed (10 km/h)

Ρ-32β
Maximum speed (20 km/h)

Ρ-32γ
Maximum speed (30 km/h)

Ρ-32δ
Maximum speed (40 km/h)

Ρ-32ε
Maximum speed (50 km/h)

Ρ-32στ
Maximum speed (60 km/h)

Ρ-32ζ
Maximum speed (70 km/h)

Ρ-32η
Maximum speed (80 km/h)

Ρ-36
End of restriction

Ρ-38
End of no overtaking

Ρ-39
No parking

Ρ-40
No parking and stopping

Ρ-49
Keep straight

Ρ-50
Turn left or right ahead

Ρ-50α
Turn left ahead

Ρ-50δ
Turn right ahead

Ρ-51α
Turn straight or left ahead

Ρ-51δ
Turn straight or right ahead

Ρ-52
Cross either on left or right

Ρ-52α
Keep left

Ρ-52δ
Keep right

Ρ-62
End of no overtaking from vehicles over 3.5 tonnes

Π-21
Pedestrian crossing

Π-23
One-way street

Π-25
Dead end

Π-75
Obstacle marker (left)

Π-75
Obstacle marker (right)

Π-75
Obstacle marker (left)

Π-75
Obstacle marker (right)

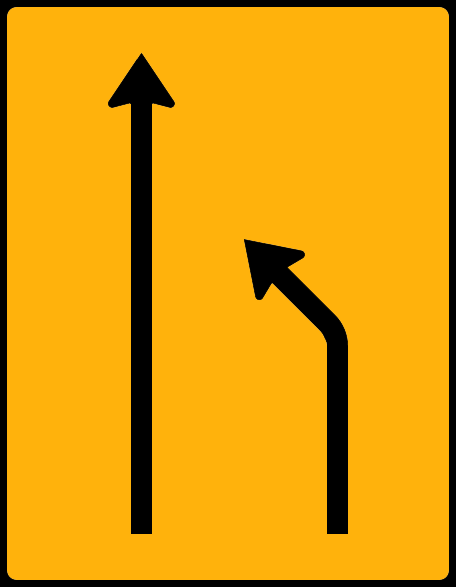
Π-70
Temporary right lane closed ahead

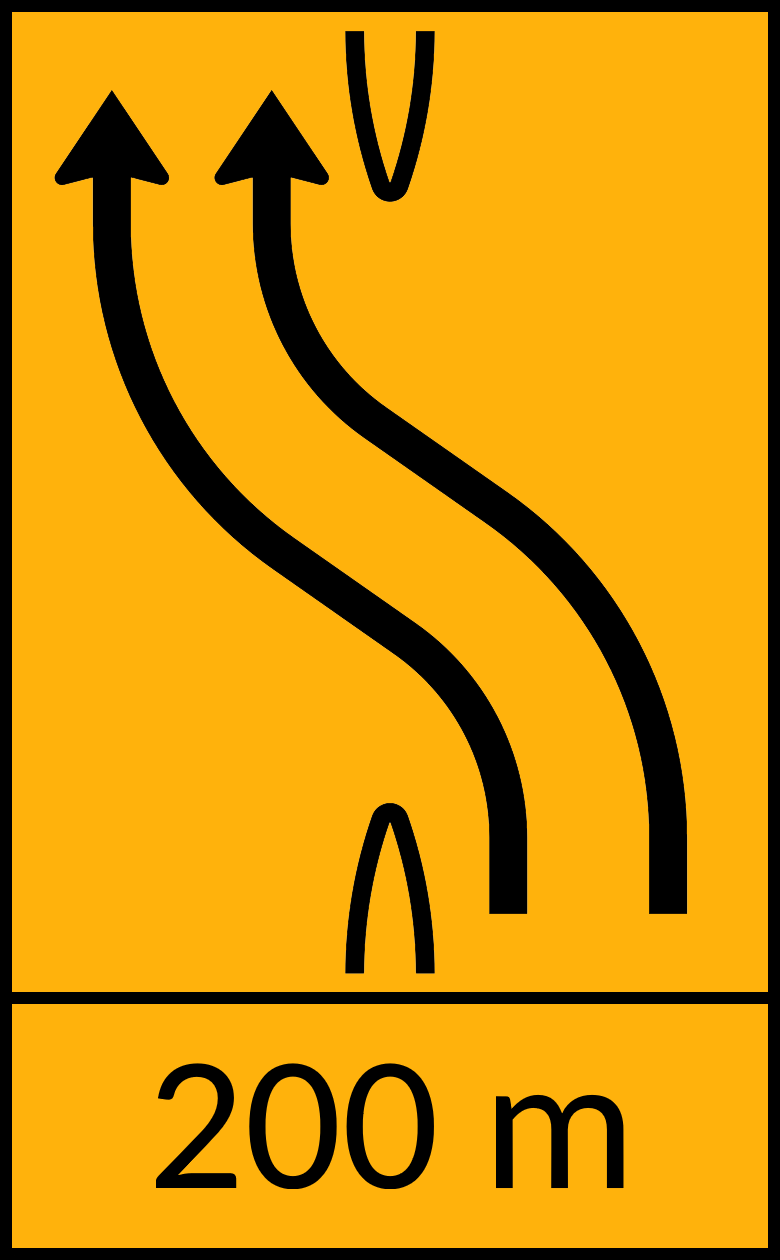
Π-103
Temporary onto opposite lane (200 m)

N/A
Caution, roadworks

N/A
Slow

N/A
Caution, entry-exit of construction site

N/A
Except construction vehicles

N/A
Diversion

N/A
Diversion

Π-9
Direction

N/A
End of roadworks from metro

N/A
Risk of falling

N/A
Movable trailer with flashers and a big arrow to indicate drivers where to go

N/A
Movable trailer with flashers and a big arrow to indicate drivers where to go

=== Other signs ===
The following signs are unofficial.

N/A
Border crossing

Κ-16
Children

Ρ-32γ
Maximum speed (30 km/h)

Π-21
Pedestrian crossing

N/A
Electrical hazard

N/A
Pedestrians

N/A
No lorries over tonnes shown (e.g. 6t)

N/A
No buses

N/A
No lorries and buses

N/A
No lorries turn left

N/A
No lorries turn right

N/A
Control

Ρ-39
No parking

N/A
No parking with arrows

N/A
No parking due to school

N/A
Start of no parking

N/A
End of no parking

N/A
Start of no parking and stopping

N/A
End of no parking and stopping

N/A
Vehicles of disabled lane

N/A
Motor vehicles lane

N/A
Lorries lane

N/A
Continuous pedestrian crossings

N/A
Children crossing

N/A
Speed bump

N/A
Caution, school

N/A
Caution, children are playing

N/A
Caution, children are playing

N/A
Left and right

N/A
Traffic camera

N/A
Direction to the Acropolis museum

N/A
Direction to the airport

=== Road markings ===
N/A
Keep straight

N/A
Turn straight, left or right ahead

N/A
Turn straight or left ahead

N/A
Turn straight or right ahead

N/A
Turn left or right ahead

N/A
Keep left

N/A
Keep right

=== Obsolete signs ===
Most of these signs are withdrawn or replaced with new diagrams of the same meaning. Others are entirely obsolete.

Κ-1α
Curve (left)

Κ-1δ
Curve (right)

Κ-2
Double curve

Κ-2
Double curve

Κ-3
Steep hill downwards

Κ-5
Road narrows

K-7
Moveable bridge

K-9
Uneven road

K-12
Slippery road

K-15
Pedestrian crossing ahead

K-18
Domesticated animals

K-20
Roadworks

K-25
Other danger

K-26
Intersection with priority to the right

K-27
Intersection with priority

K-29δ
Merging traffic from the right

K-31
Level crossing with a barrier or gate

K-32
Level crossing without a barrier or gate

N/A
Piraeus-Perama level crossing

K-33
Distance to level crossing (farthest)

K-34
Distance to level crossing (middle)

K-35
Distance to level crossing (closest)

K-36
Single-track railway

K-37
Multi-track railway

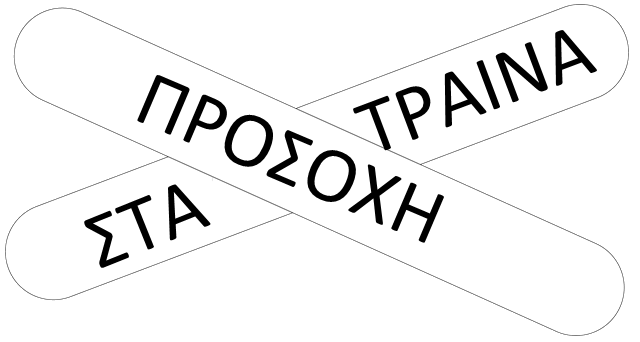
N/A
Attention to the trains

Ρ-1
Give way

Ρ-2
Stop

Ρ-7
No entry

Ρ-30
No overtaking (cars)

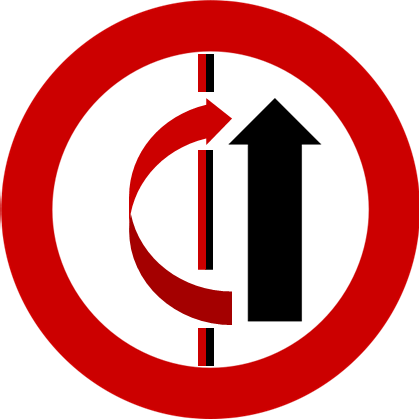
Ρ-30
No overtaking (arrows)

Ρ-34
Customs control

Ρ-39
No parking

Ρ-39
No parking

Ρ-41
No parking on odd months

Ρ-42
No parking on even months

Ρ-47
Turn left

Ρ-48
Turn right

Ρ-49
Keep straight

Ρ-50
Turn left or right ahead

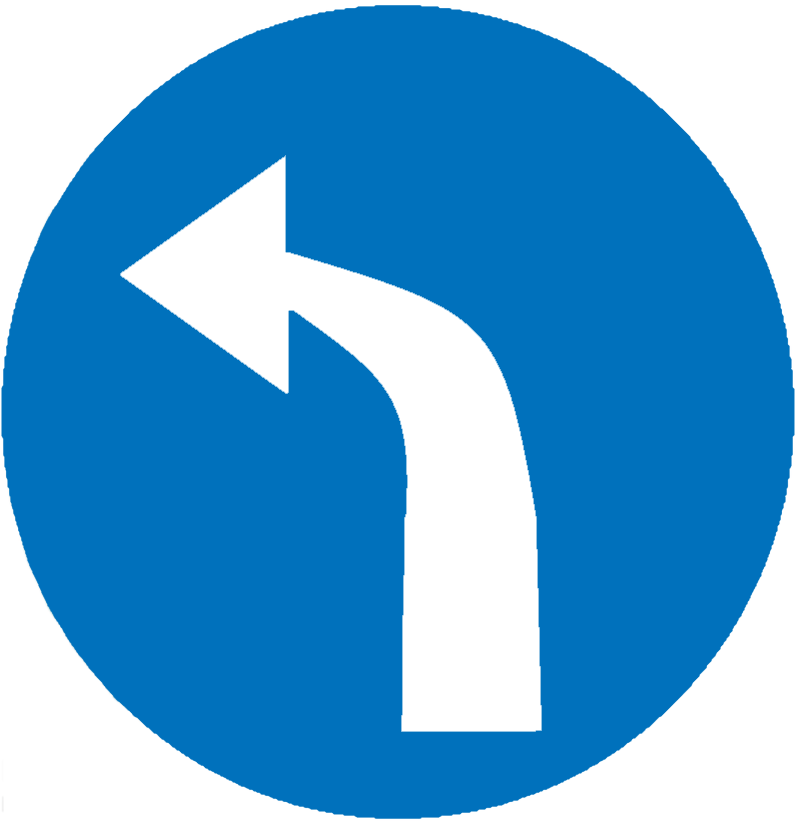
P-50α
Turn left ahead

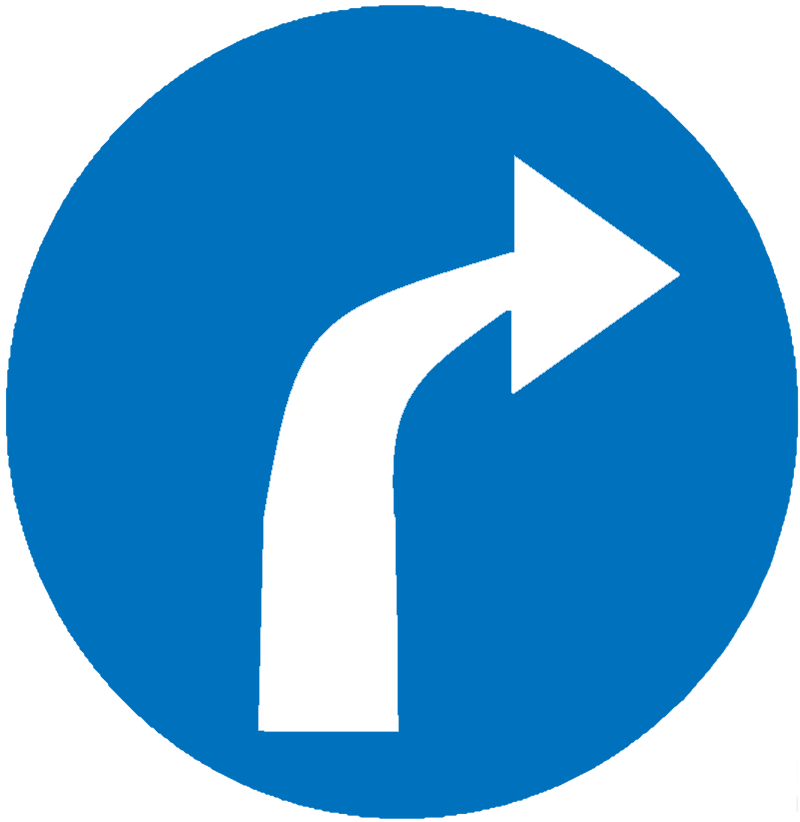
P-50δ
Turn right ahead

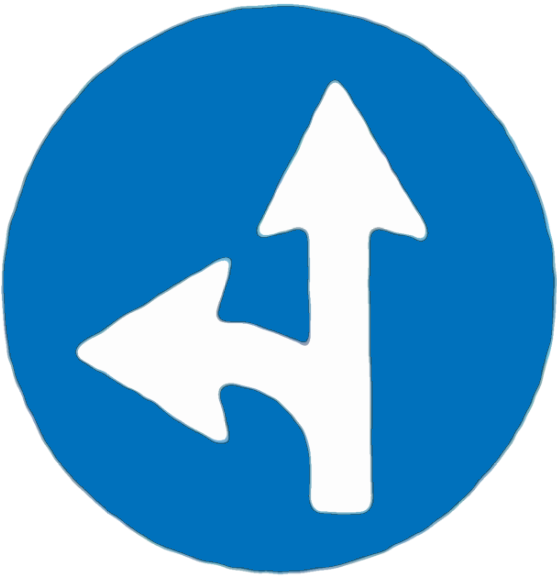
P-51α
Turn straight or left ahead

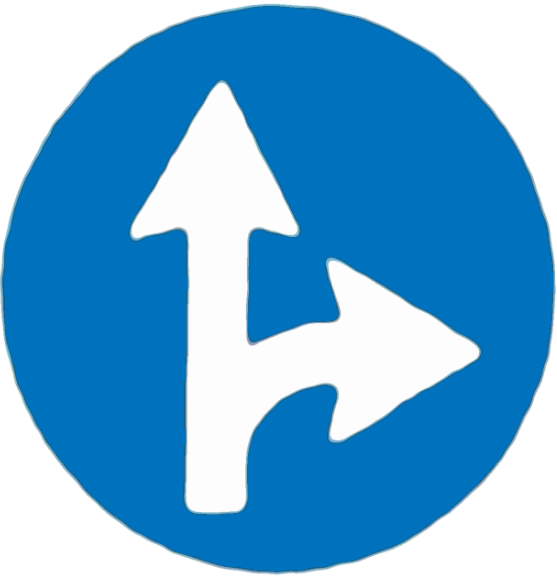
P-51δ
Turn straight or right ahead

P-52α
Keep left

P-52δ
Keep right

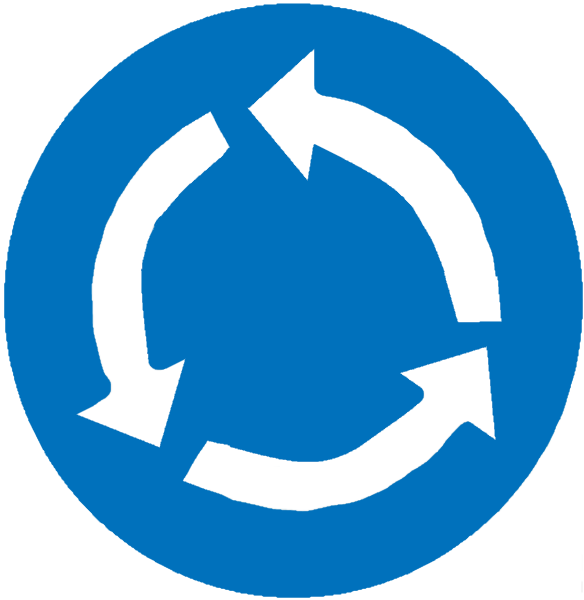
P-53
Roundabout

P-54
Bicycle lane

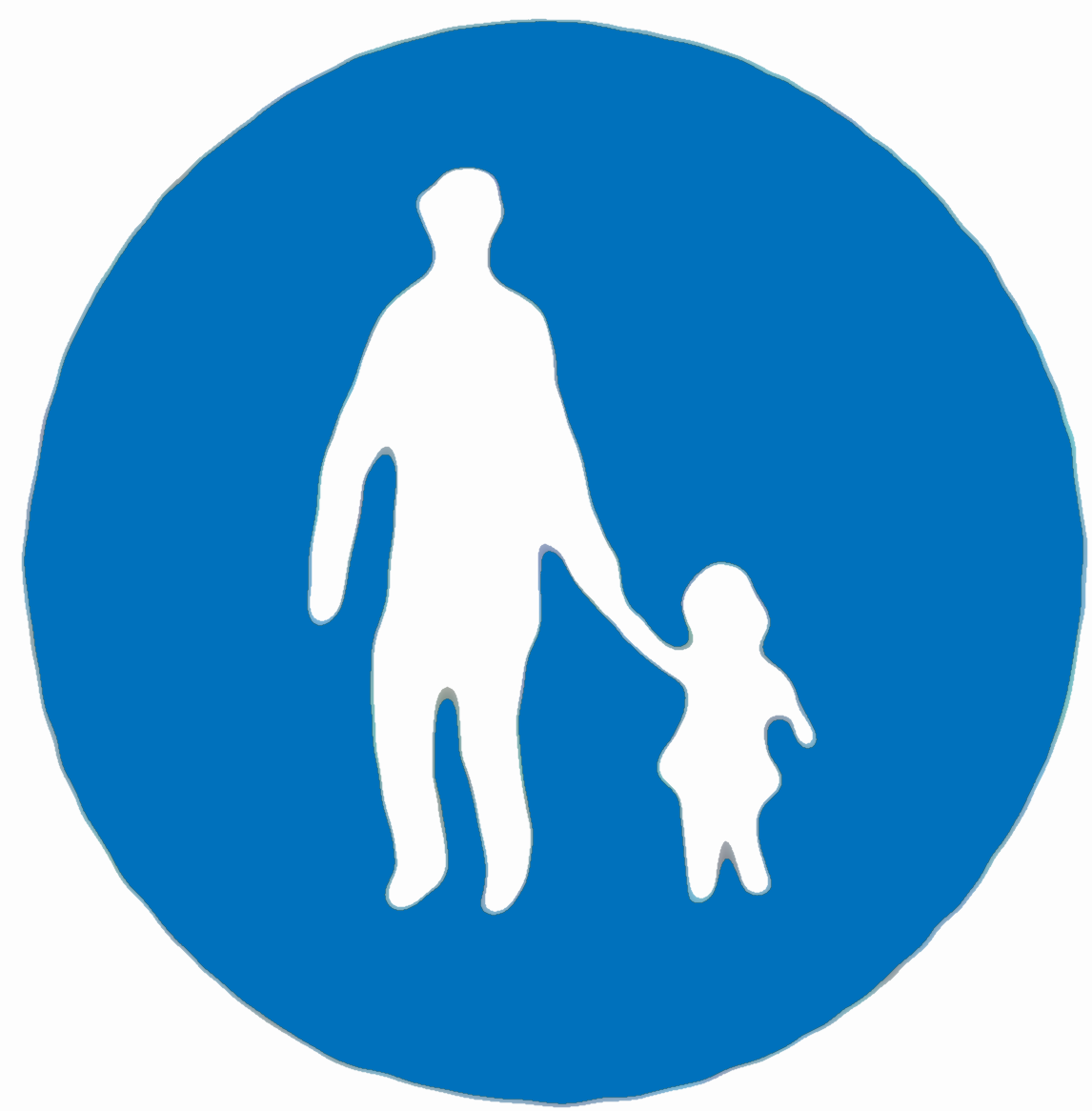
P-55
Pedestrian lane (footpath)

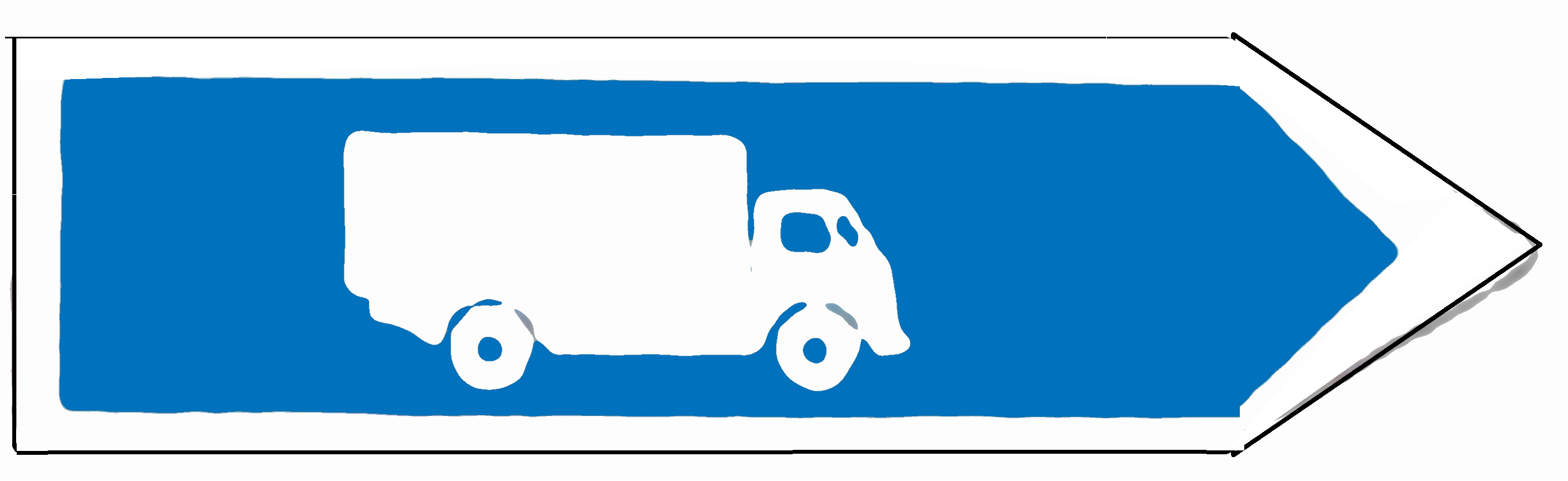
N/A
Obligatory run of the depicted vehicle

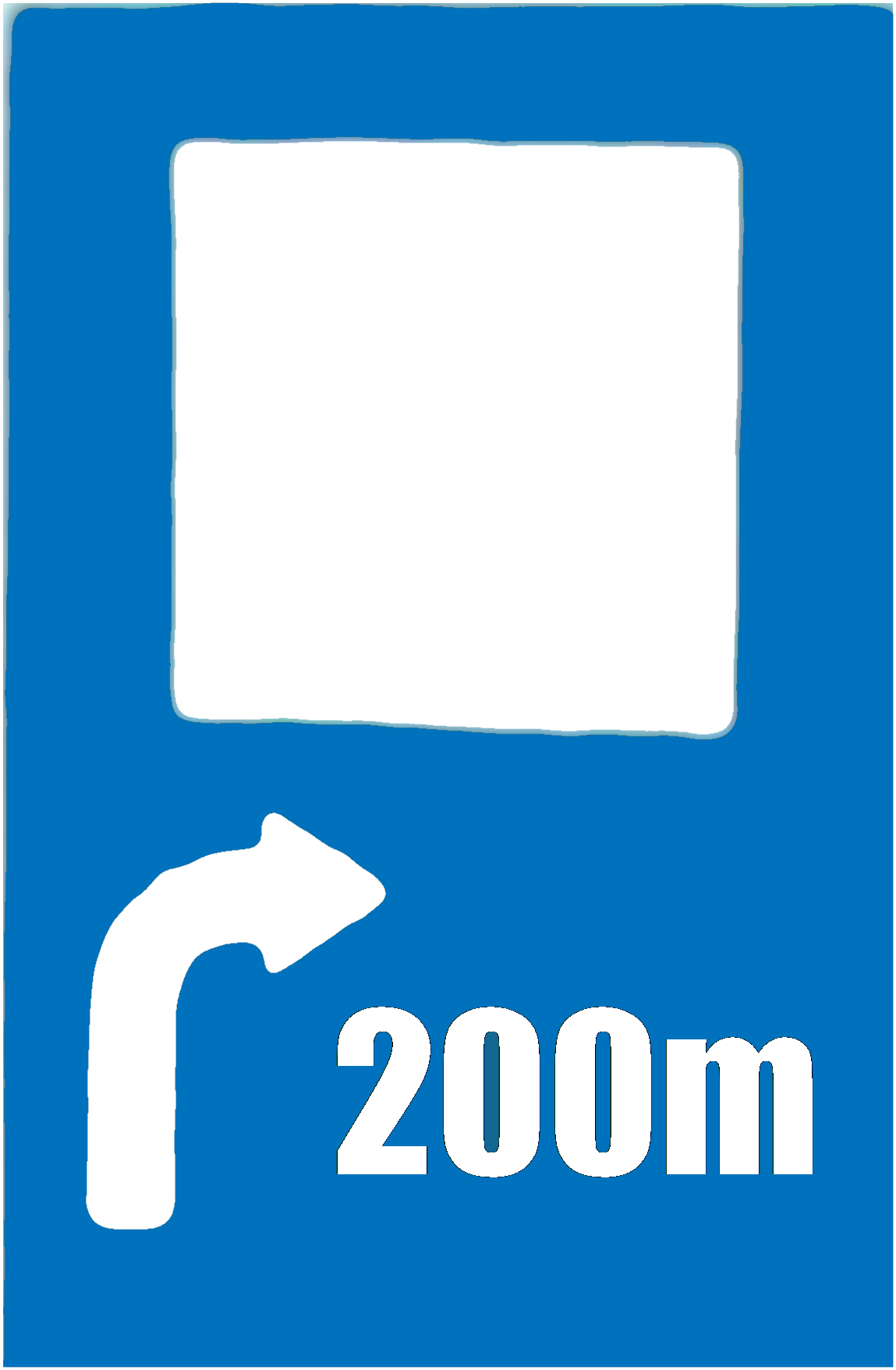
N/A
Special direction & distance sign of the vehicle shown in the white space

N/A
Slow

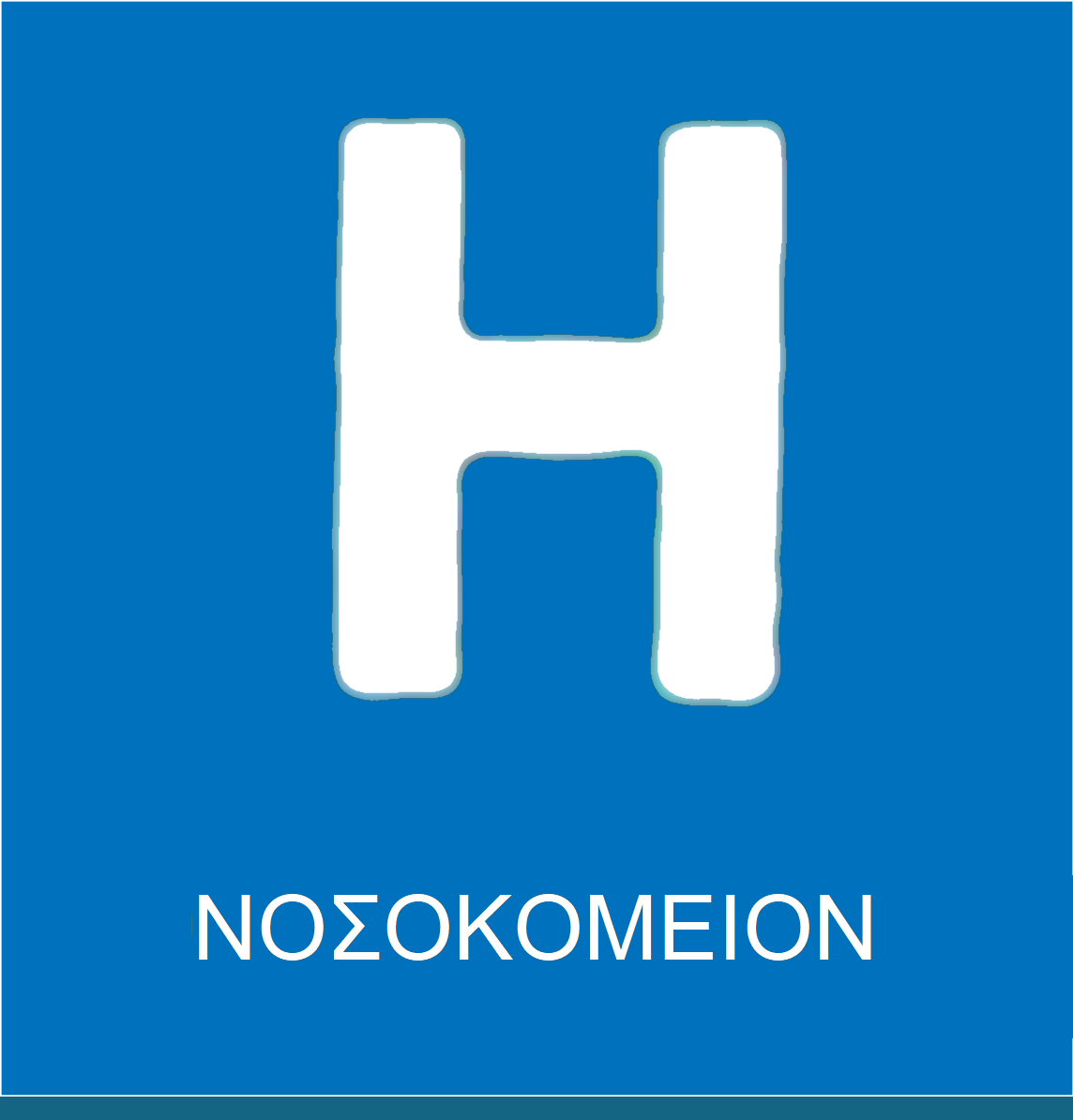
Π-22
Hospital

Π-27
Motorway

Π-27α
End of motorway

Π-31
Parking place

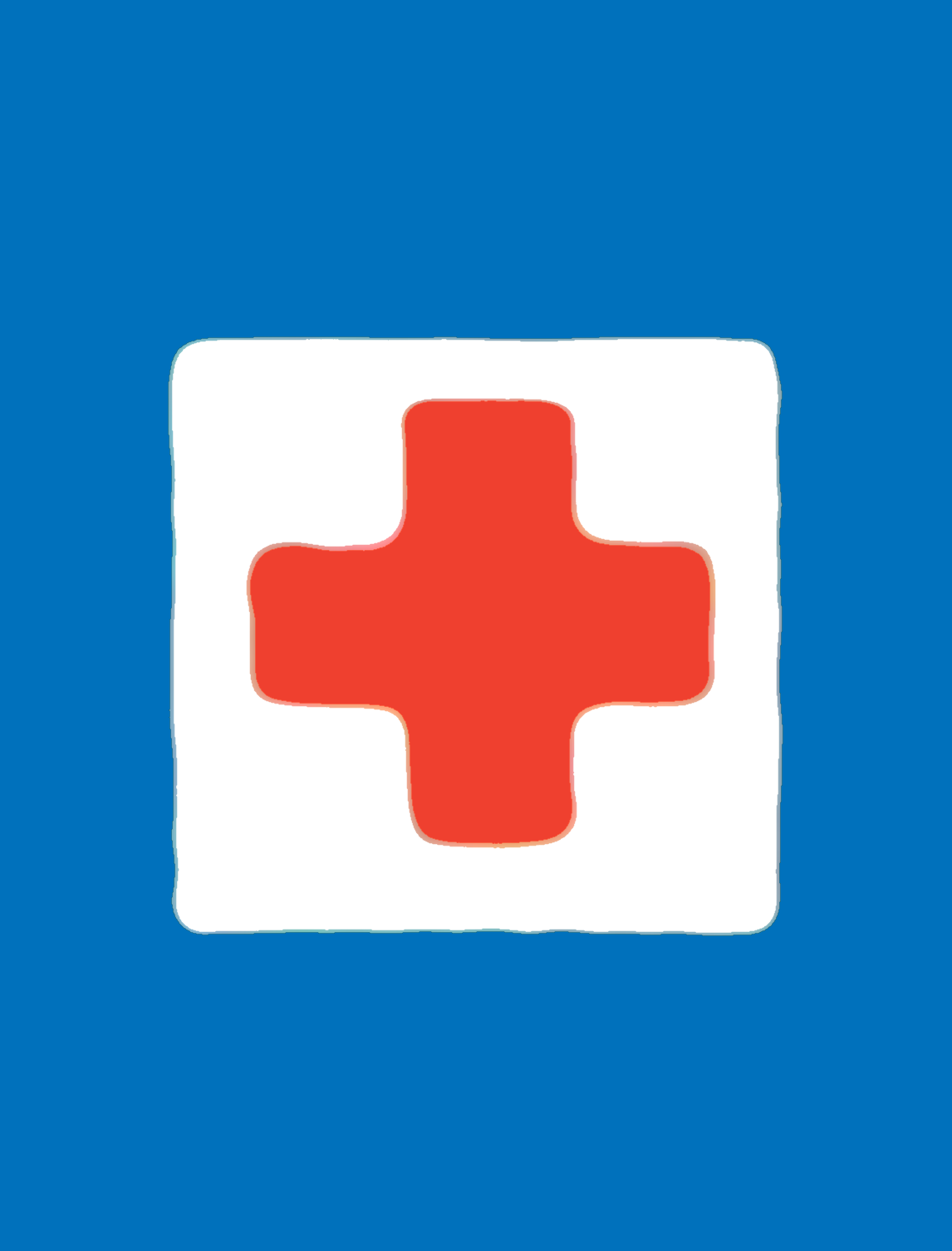
Π-32
First aid

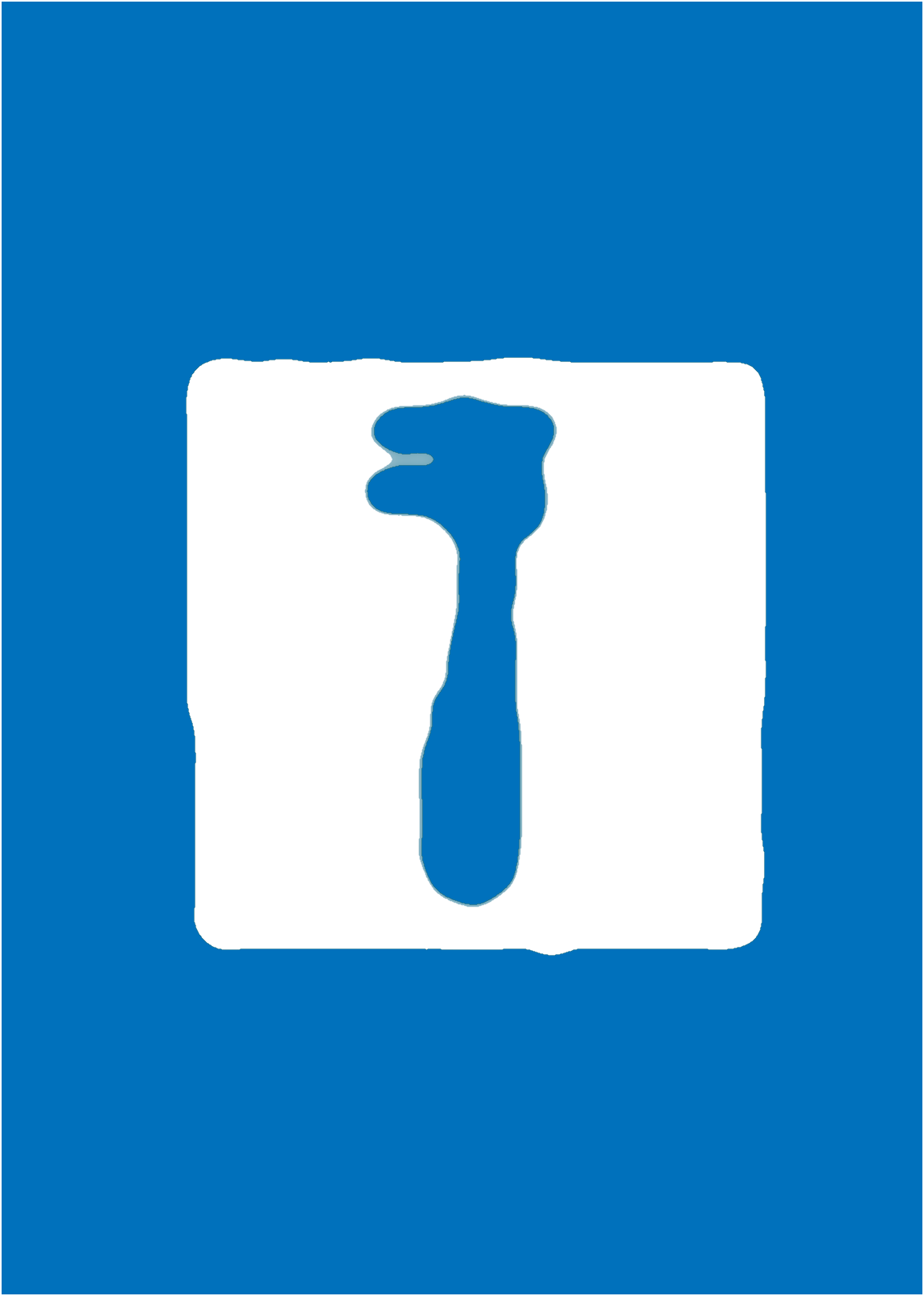
Π-33
Reparis

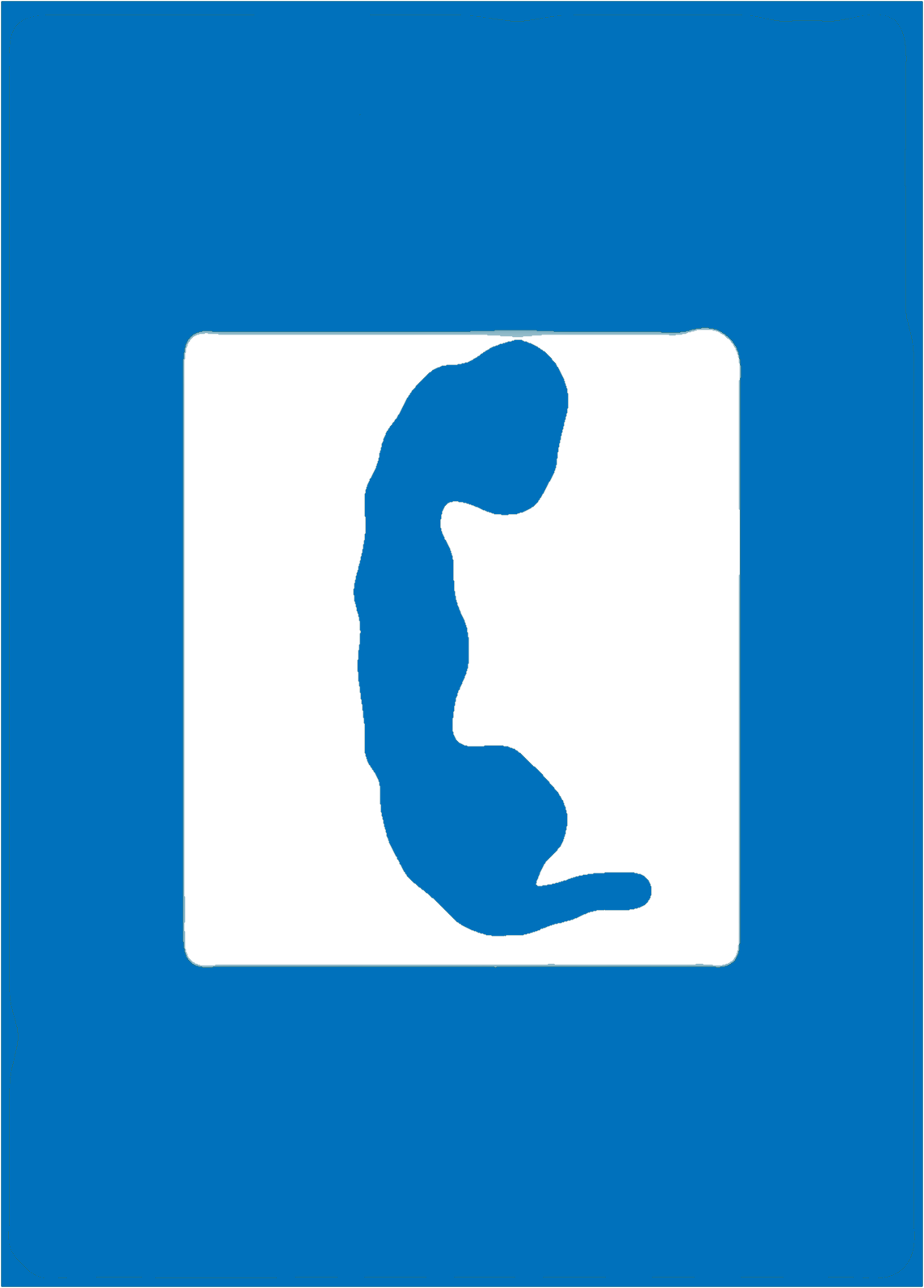
Π-34
Telephone

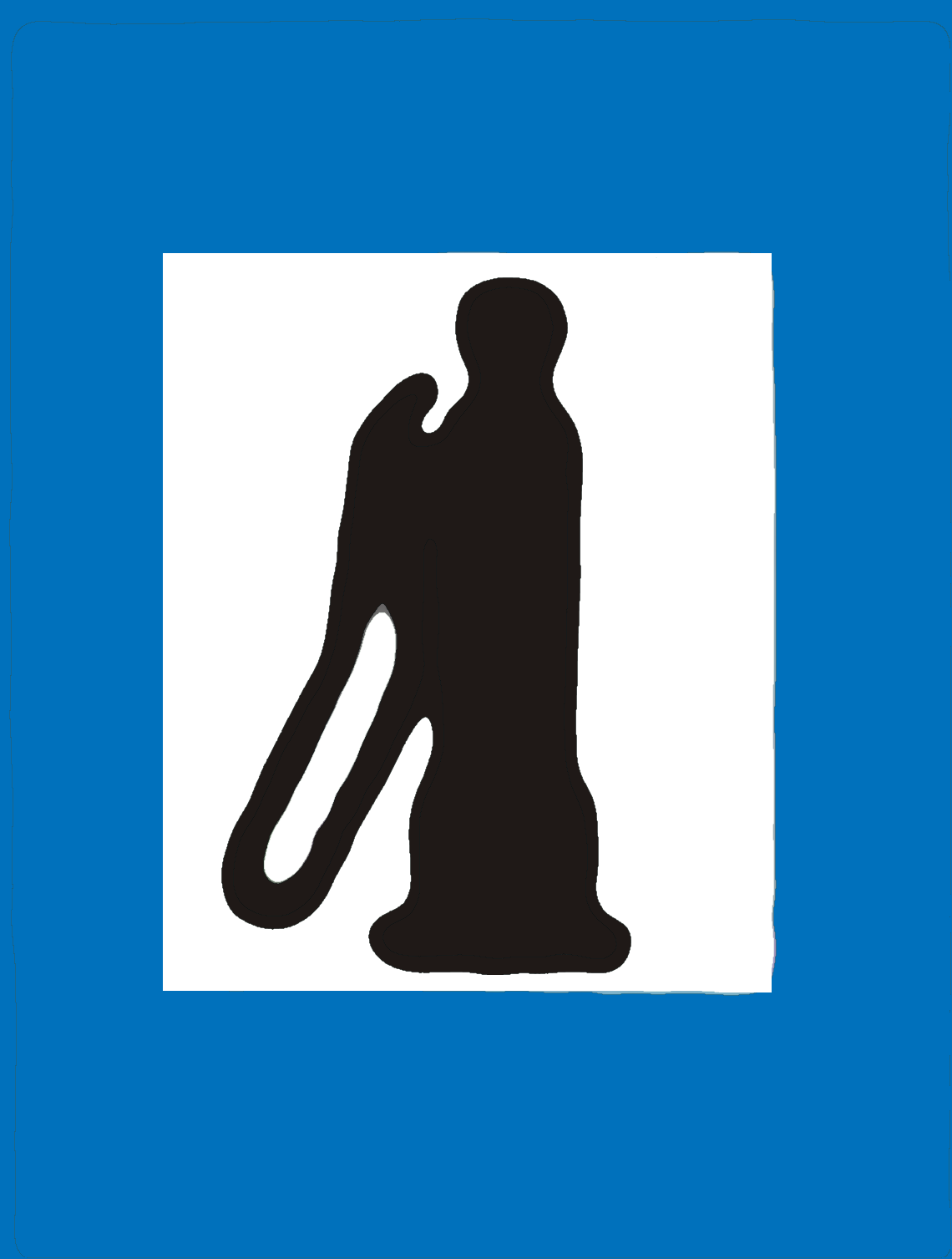
Π-35
Petrol station

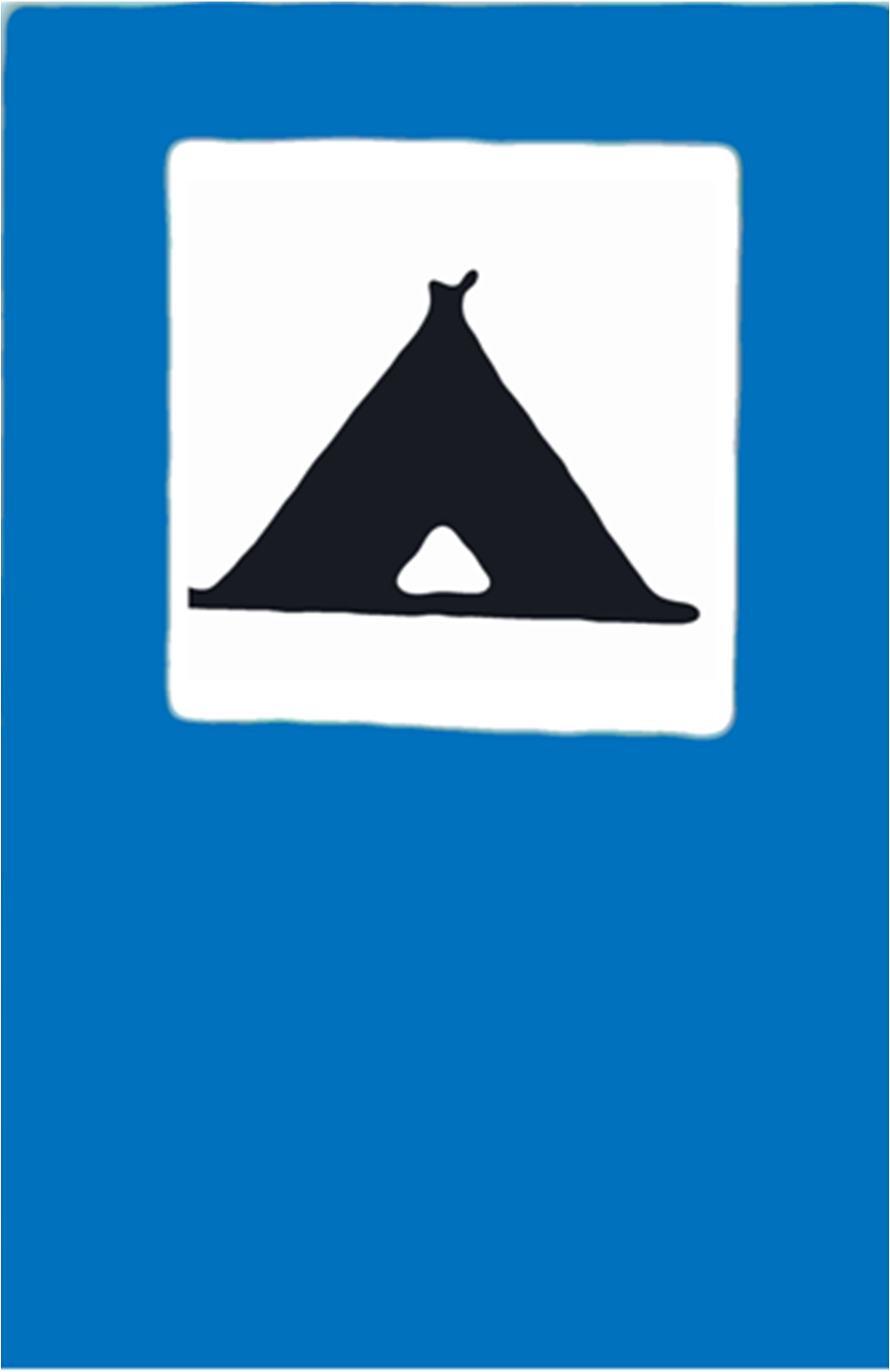
Π-41
Camping site

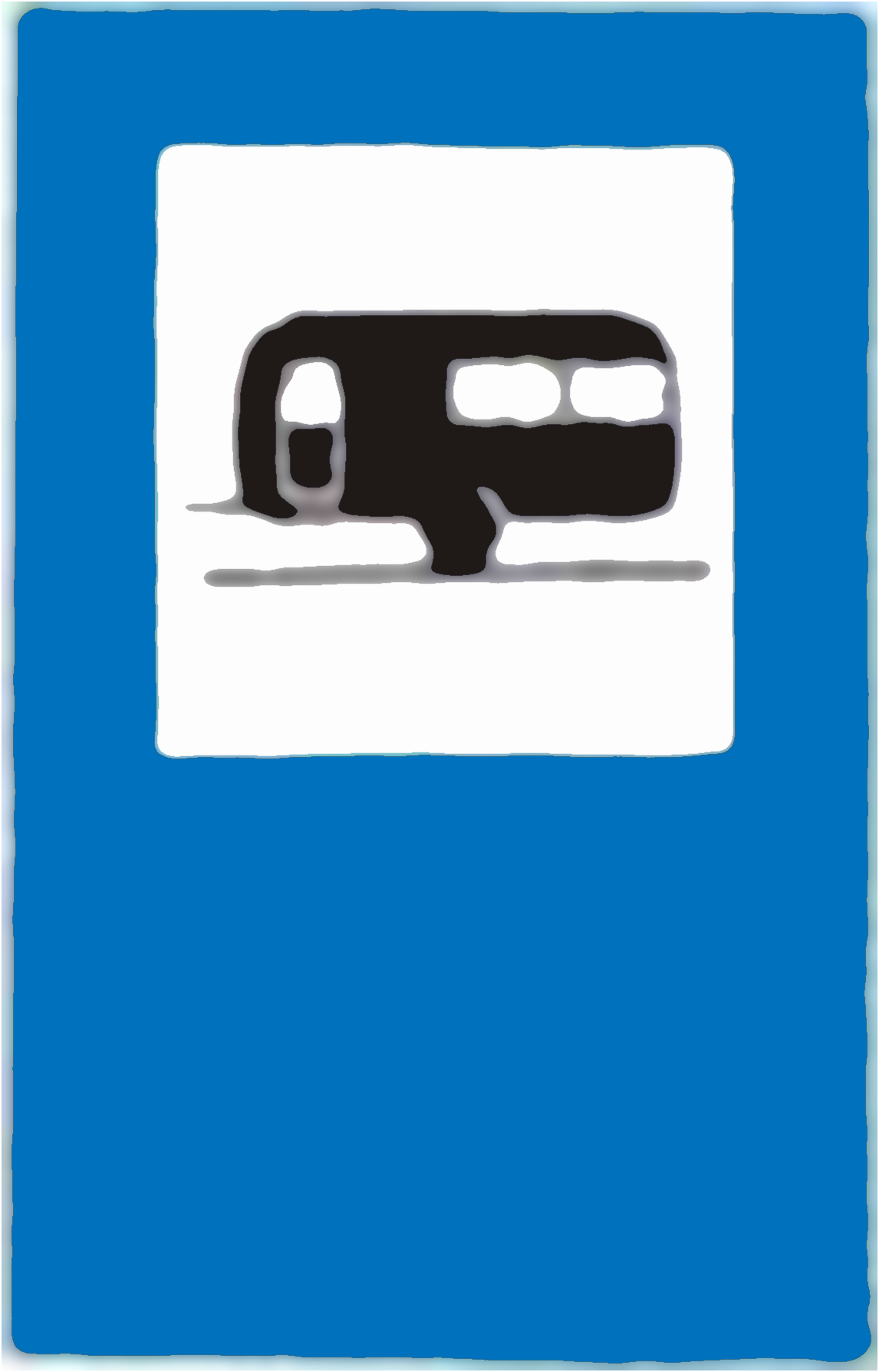
N/A
Parking lot for caravans

Πρ-4α
Beginning of...

Πρ-4β
Continual of...

Πρ-4γ
End of...

N/A
Risk of fire

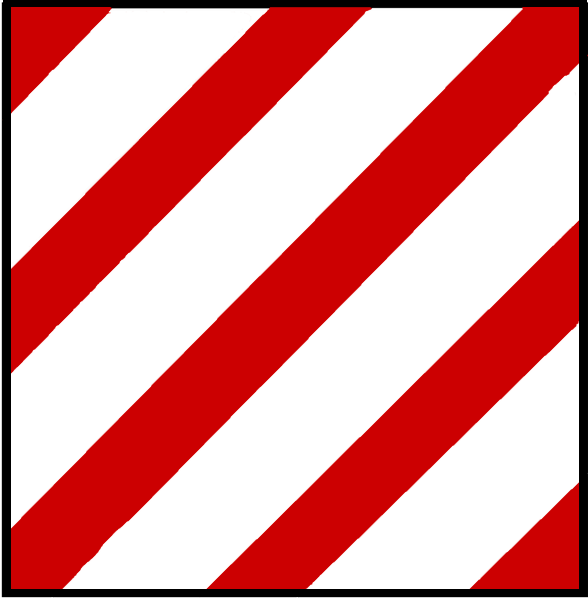
N/A
Progressive load indications

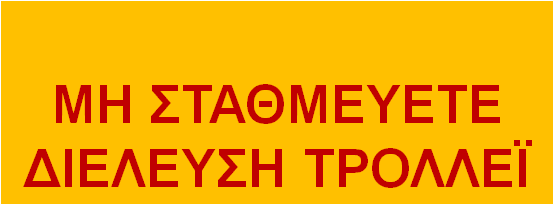
N/A
No parking, trolleybus crosses

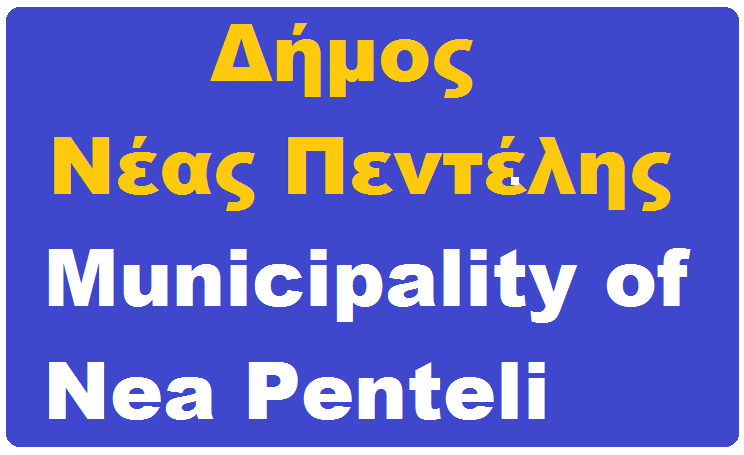
N/A
Δήμος Νέας Πεντέλης

=== Athens bus service signs ===
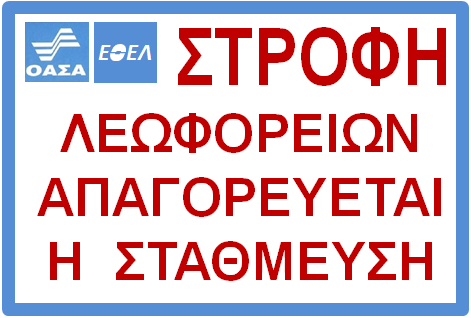

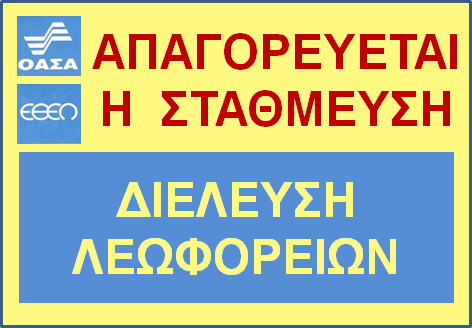
"No parking. Bus passing". Athens Urban Transport (OASA) and Thermal Bus Company (ETHEL) road sign.

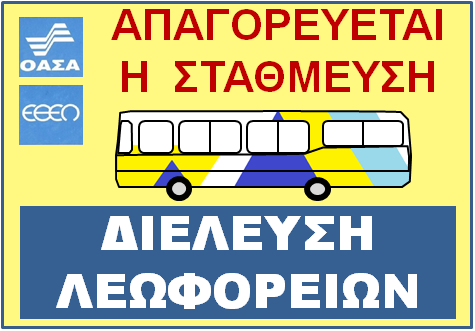
"No parking. Bus passing". Athens Urban Transport (OASA) and Thermal Bus Company (ETHEL) road sign.

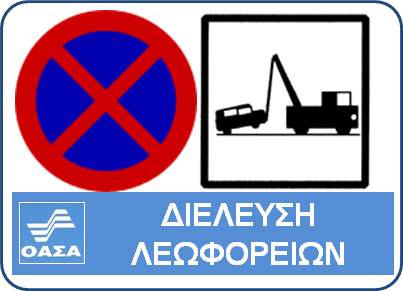
"Bus passing. Illegally parked vehicles will be towed". Athens Urban Transport (OASA) and Thermal Bus Company (ETHEL) new road sign.

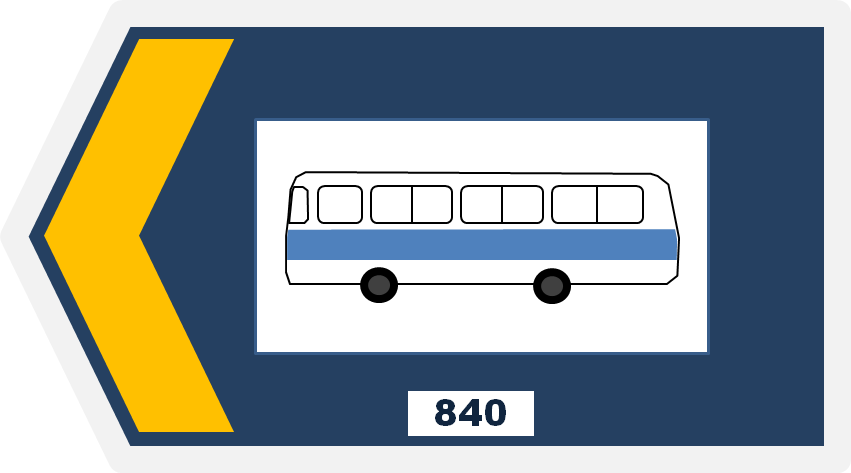
Left arrow - Athens Urban Transport (OASA) guidance sign (with route label).

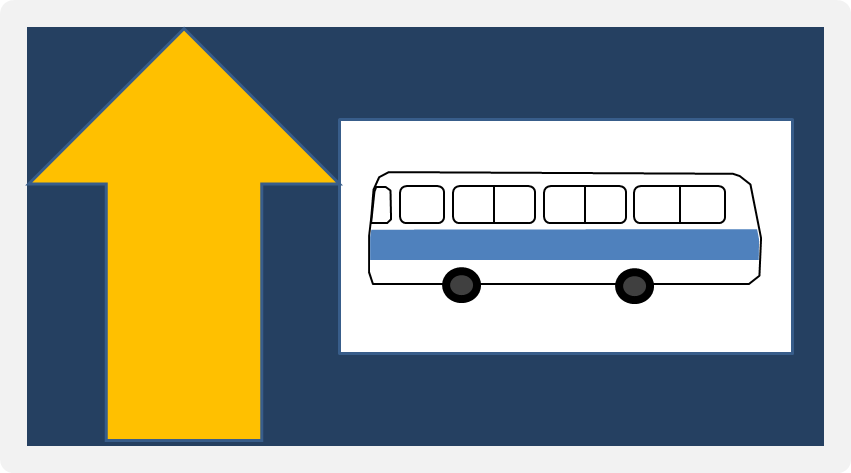
Forward arrow - Athens Urban Transport (OASA) guidance (without route label).

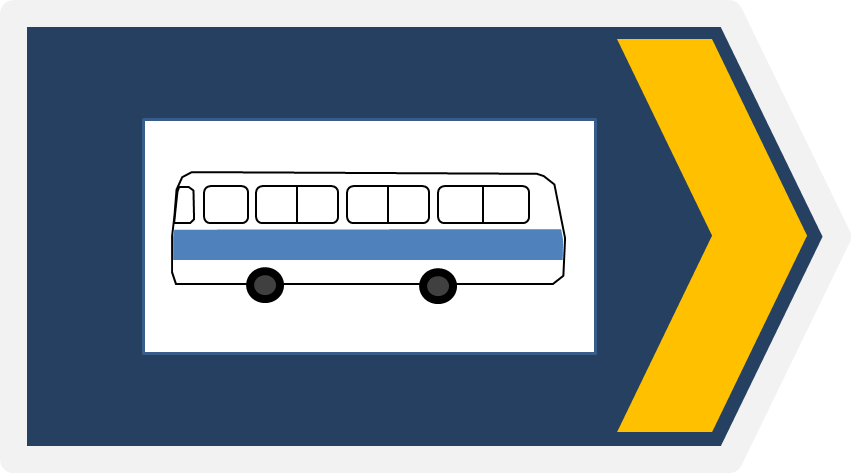
Right arrow - Athens Urban Transport (OASA) guidance (without route label).

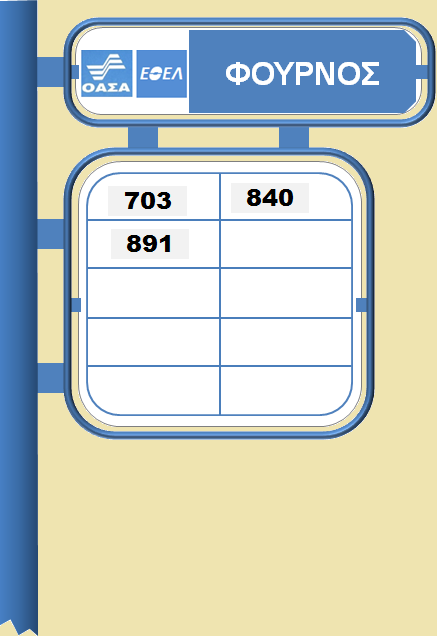
Old Athens bus stop sign (OASA-ETHEL) circa 1994–2005.

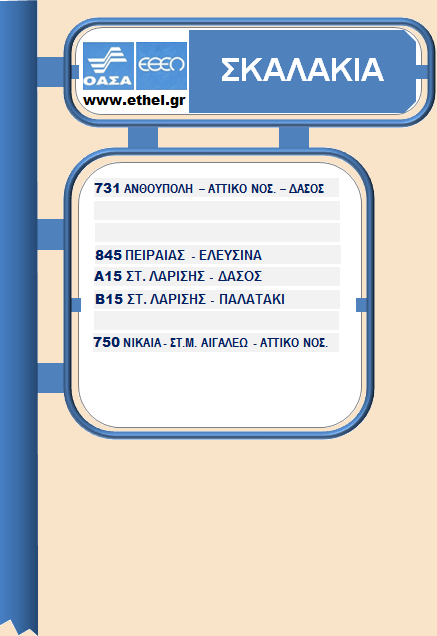
Recent Athens bus stop sign (OASA-ETHEL) circa 2005–2015.

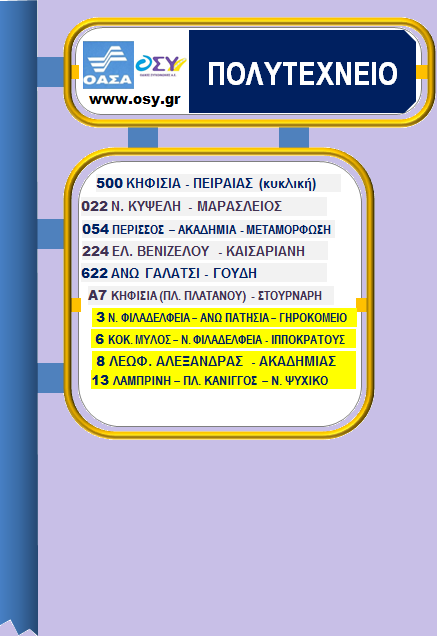
Most recent Athens bus stop sign (OASA-OSY) since 2015 circa.
