= Stumbling block (disambiguation) =

A stumbling block is a behavior or attitude that leads another to sin.

Stumbling block may also refer to:

- Stumbling block (monument), a small, cobblestone-sized memorial for a single victim of Nazism
- Stumbling block (philosophy), an object, thing, action or situation that causes an obstruction
- an obstacle
