= Iching Biching =

Children's game

Iching Biching (Bengali: ইচিং বিচিং) is a popular traditional rural game played in Bangladesh and across the Indian subcontinent. The game is usually played by children and young girls, who typically select green fields near their villages as the playing area. One of the main features of this game is the element of height-jumping.

== Rules ==
Two players sit side by side and create an obstacle of increasing height for other players to jump over. Initially, they build the height using their ankles. After the players successfully jump over this obstacle, the sitting players increase the height by placing one foot over the other.

As the game progresses, they continue to increase the height by extending their palms on top of their feet. After clearing the height, the sitting players form a triangular boundary by freeing both legs. The jumping players must cross this boundary by hopping and reciting a rhyme, taking three leaps to clear it.

In the final phase of the game, the sitting players join their legs again. Each jumping player must leap into the air while chanting the "Iching Biching" rhyme, crossing the joined legs twice to complete the game.
