= Merge (traffic) =

Point where two streams of traffic merge into a single lane

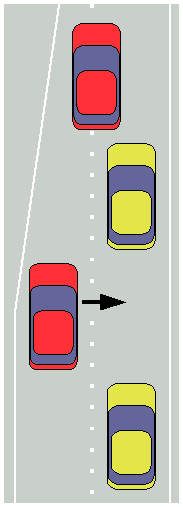
Two lanes merging into one

In traffic engineering, a merge is the point where two streams of traffic travelling in the same direction from multiple roads or in multiple lanes on the same road are required to merge into a single lane.

A merge may be a permanent road feature, for example at the end of a dual carriageway, or a temporary feature, common during roadworks.

== Methods ==
=== Slip road ===
Generally speaking, at a slip road onto a controlled-access highway or otherwise, traffic on the highway has priority over traffic joining at the slip road, and therefore the slip road traffic should accelerate to the speed on the major road and merge into a gap in the stream of traffic in lane one. At some slip roads, traffic continues into a new lane (a "lane gain") and therefore does not need to merge.

=== Early merge ===
The early merge method dictates that one stream of traffic will maintain priority over another at the merge, and therefore traffic in the other lane should merge at the first opportunity. To encourage drivers to merge early, authorities may employ a static or dynamic early merge strategy. Strictly speaking an early merge is different from a conventional merging method, in that the traffic is encouraged to merge well in advance of the merge point.

A static early merge strategy involves the placement of advance notices for a fixed distance in advance of the lane closure. This method may reduce the chance for rear-end collisions by warning drivers of the closure in advance of congestion.

A dynamic merge strategy involves advance notices for a variable distance from the lane closure. For example, in the US state of Indiana, a dynamic no-passing zone is created in advance of the merge, to ensure drivers can move into the open lane before reaching the end of a queue.

=== Late merge ===
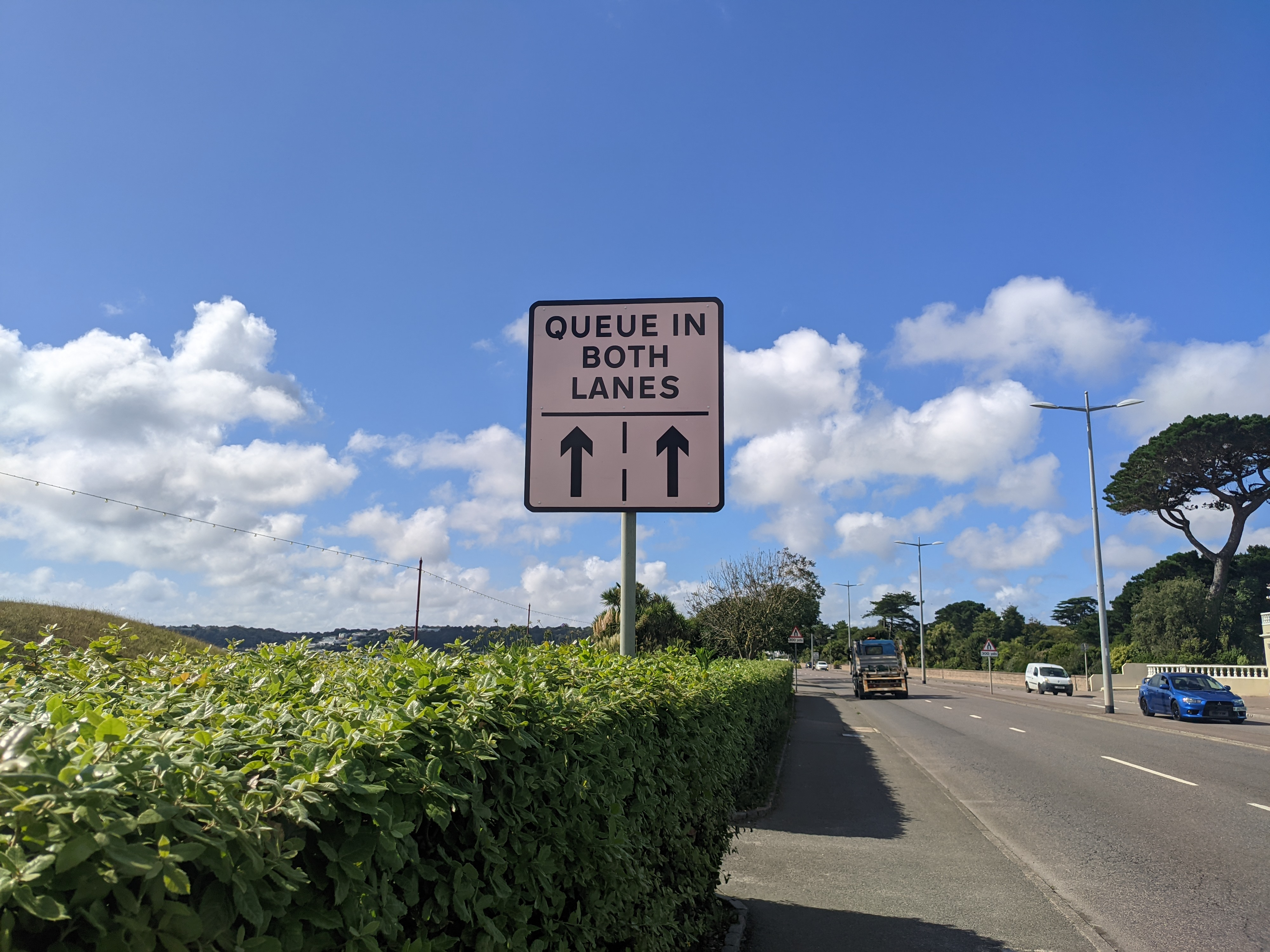
A 'Queue in both lanes' sign orders drivers to use both lanes up to the merge point

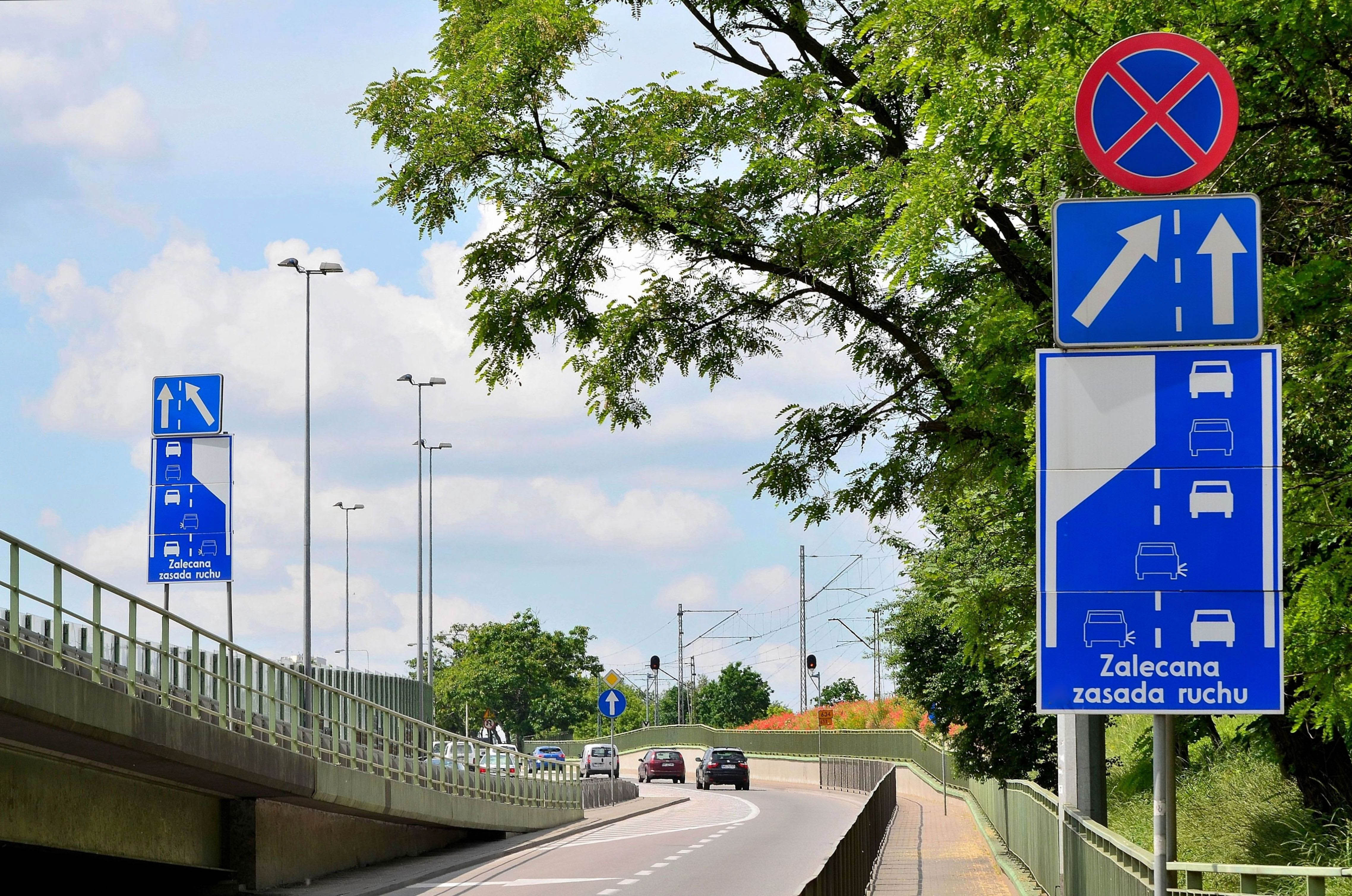
Zipper method road signage in Warsaw

The late merge method, also known as zipper merging, dictates that both streams of traffic should continue to drive up to the point of closure of one stream and merge at the marked taper. Both streams should create alternating gaps (like the teeth of a zipper) into which vehicles from the other stream can merge at the merge point (thus "zipping up" the zipper). In heavy traffic flow, traffic should therefore queue in both lanes in advance of the merge.

The late merge method considerably reduces both queue/line ("backup") length (because drivers use the ending lane until it ends) and speed differences between the two lanes, increasing safety. The late merge operates at a nearly 20 percent higher capacity than a conventional merge. In the case of Interstate 77 in North Carolina, where signs directed people to use the zipper merge, the maximum length of the backup was reduced from eight miles to two.

A possible dynamic merge method would use variable message signs to instruct drivers to use all available lanes and then to merge in turn (as a zipper merge) if queueing is detected. At other times, drivers would use a conventional merging method.

Some governments hold campaigns to promote the late merge method because irritation and aggression are common among drivers who are not educated about the benefits of the technique. These drivers sometimes straddle lanes to block late mergers. Often drivers who change lanes too early do not like to see other drivers continue until the end of the drop-away lane, even though the signage reveals that the road authorities want late merging to take place.

== In various jurisdictions ==
In most countries, a driver can be penalized for not using the late merge method, but in some countries only where a traffic sign so indicates.

=== Canada ===
Sample British Columbia signage (sign C-138-TF)

British Columbia's sign manual provides designs for zipper merge signs.

=== United Kingdom ===
Under the Highway Code, drivers should not use the right lane except when overtaking other vehicles, therefore they should move back to the left-hand lane as soon as it is safe to do so (Rule 137). However, they are advised not to change lanes unnecessarily in congested road conditions (Rule 134). The Code does recommend merging in turn if it is safe and if vehicles are travelling at a very low speed, e.g. when approaching road works or a road traffic incident (Rule 134).

=== United States ===
Most American states and territories require merging traffic to yield to through traffic in the lane they wish to enter. This further complicates the common understanding of proper merging protocol, for even though zipper merging is widely encouraged, those doing so are still legally required to yield, and those who choose not to let them merge are not doing anything wrong from a legal standpoint. Traffic in the lane being merged into has the right of way over the merging traffic from the lane that will disappear.

Minnesota and Missouri recommend that drivers zipper merge. Pennsylvania's sign manual provides designs for zipper merge signs.

== See also ==
- Filter in turn
