= Loose chippings =

Loose gravel on a road surface

UK loose chippings sign. In other European countries, the signs are similar.

Loose chippings are loose gravel or stone fragments on a road surface and form a hazard to vehicles using that road. It may come from the road's chip seal. Causes include:

- Unbound surplus aggregate not removed from the surface when the road is resurfaced.
- Raveling of a chip seal or asphalt concrete pavement. This is usually the result of a poor bond between the asphalt and the aggregate. As a result, the aggregate breaks free from the road surface.
- Raveling caused by mechanical wear from snowplows or studded snow tires.
- Gravel deposited on the road by erosion of cut sections above the road.
- Gravel carried onto the road by tyres of a vehicle that was driven onto a gravel shoulder, or entered a paved road from a gravel road.

Excessive speed while driving through loose chippings damage both the road and vehicles. Loose chippings can reduce traction and cause loss of control. This is a special hazard to motorcyclists and bicyclists, who may lose their balance and fall if their tires start sliding. Loose chippings can be picked up by tyres and damage them, or may be spun off to become high speed missiles, which may injure or damage other persons or vehicles on the road.

Loose chippings may accumulate on verges, where they may choke drainage channels.

In many countries, road signs are put up, requiring vehicles to drive at a low speed. In the United Kingdom, these temporary traffic signs require the driver to proceed at 20 mph.
