= Obstacle =

Object that blocks one's way or prevents or hinders progress

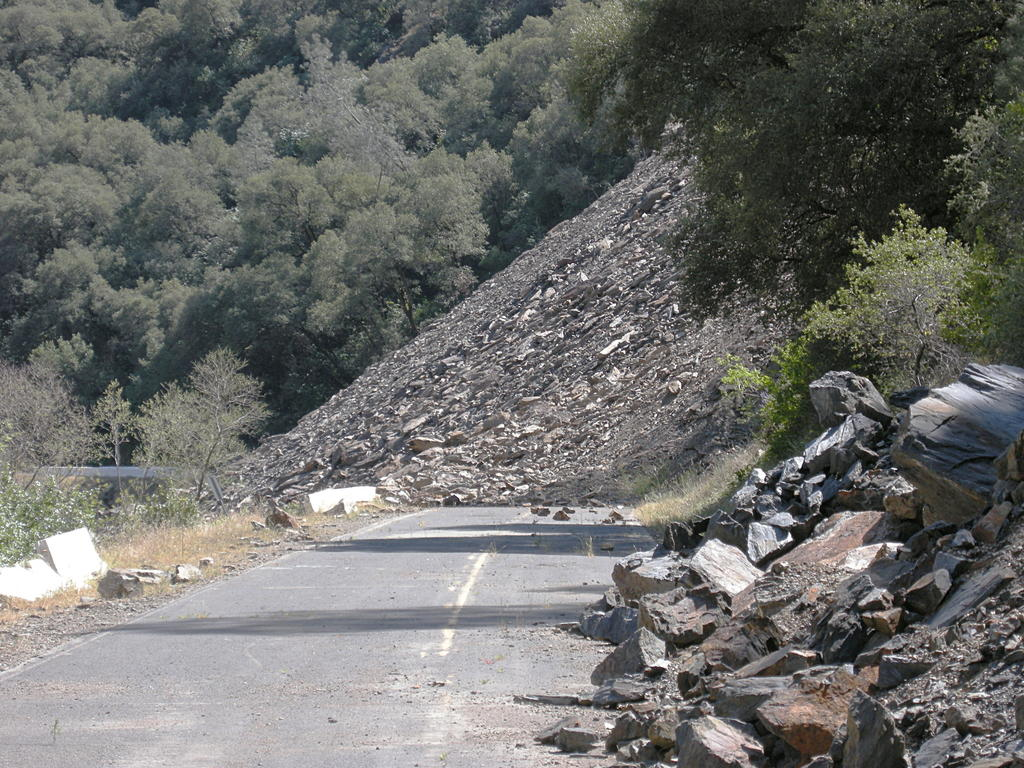
Obstacle to traffic caused by the Ferguson landslide in the state of California (USA)

An obstacle (also called a barrier, impediment, or stumbling block) is an object, thing, action or situation that causes an obstruction. A obstacle blocks or hinders our way forward. Different types of obstacles include physical, economic, biopsychosocial, cultural, political, technological and military.

== Types ==
=== Physical ===
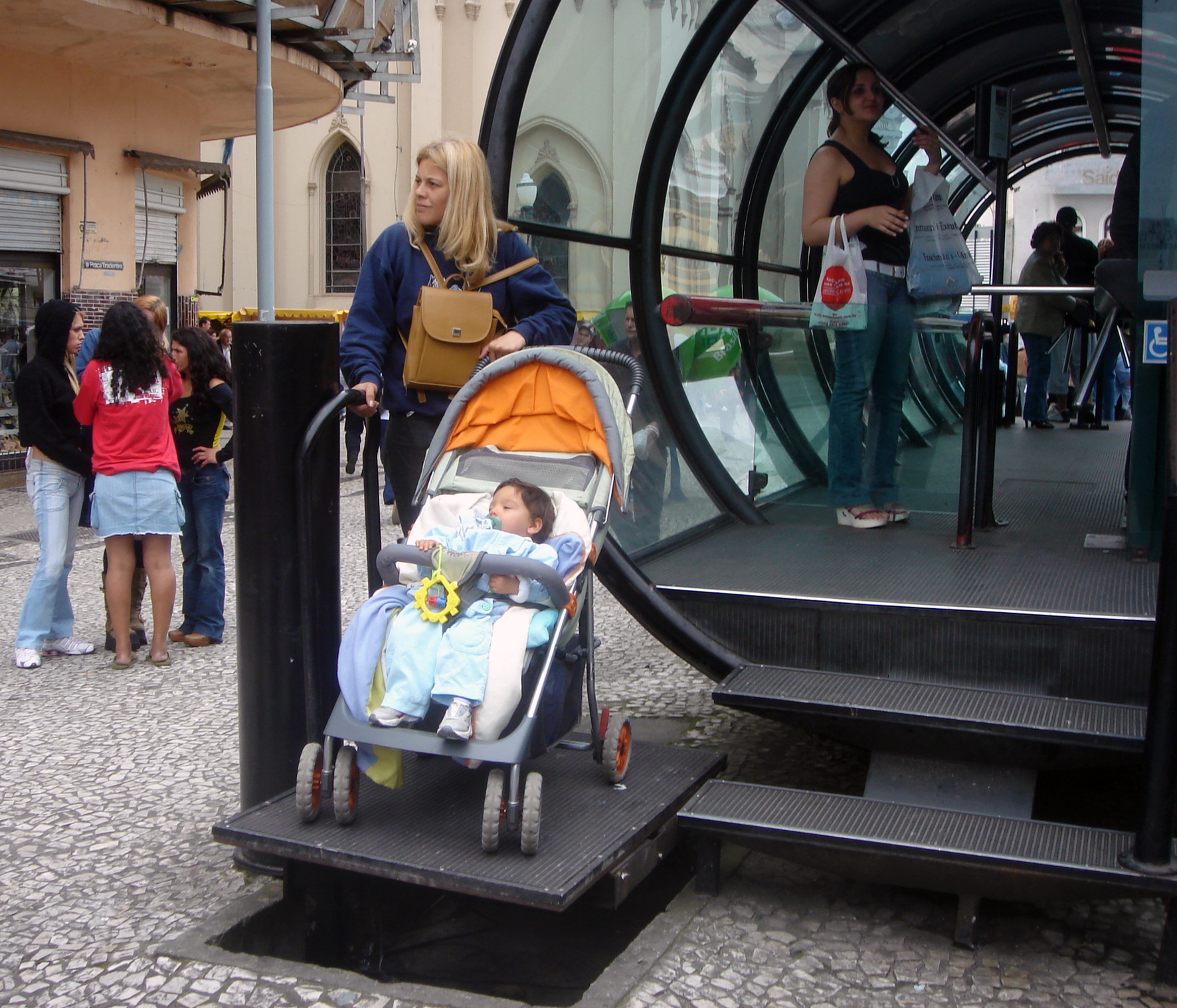
Universal access is provided in Curitiba's public transport system, Brazil.

As physical obstacles, we can enumerate all those physical barriers that block the action and prevent the progress or the achievement of a concrete goal. Examples:

- architectural barriers that hinder access to people with reduced mobility;
- doors, gates, and access control systems, designed to keep intruders or attackers out;
- large objects, fallen trees or collapses through passageways, paths, roads, railroads, waterways or airfields, preventing mobility;
- sandbanks, rocks or coral reefs, preventing free navigation;
- hills, mountains and weather phenomena preventing the free traffic of aircraft;
- meteors, meteorites, micrometeorites, cosmic dust, comets, space debris, strong electromagnetic radiation or gravitational field, preventing a spacecraft from navigating freely in space.

=== Sports ===
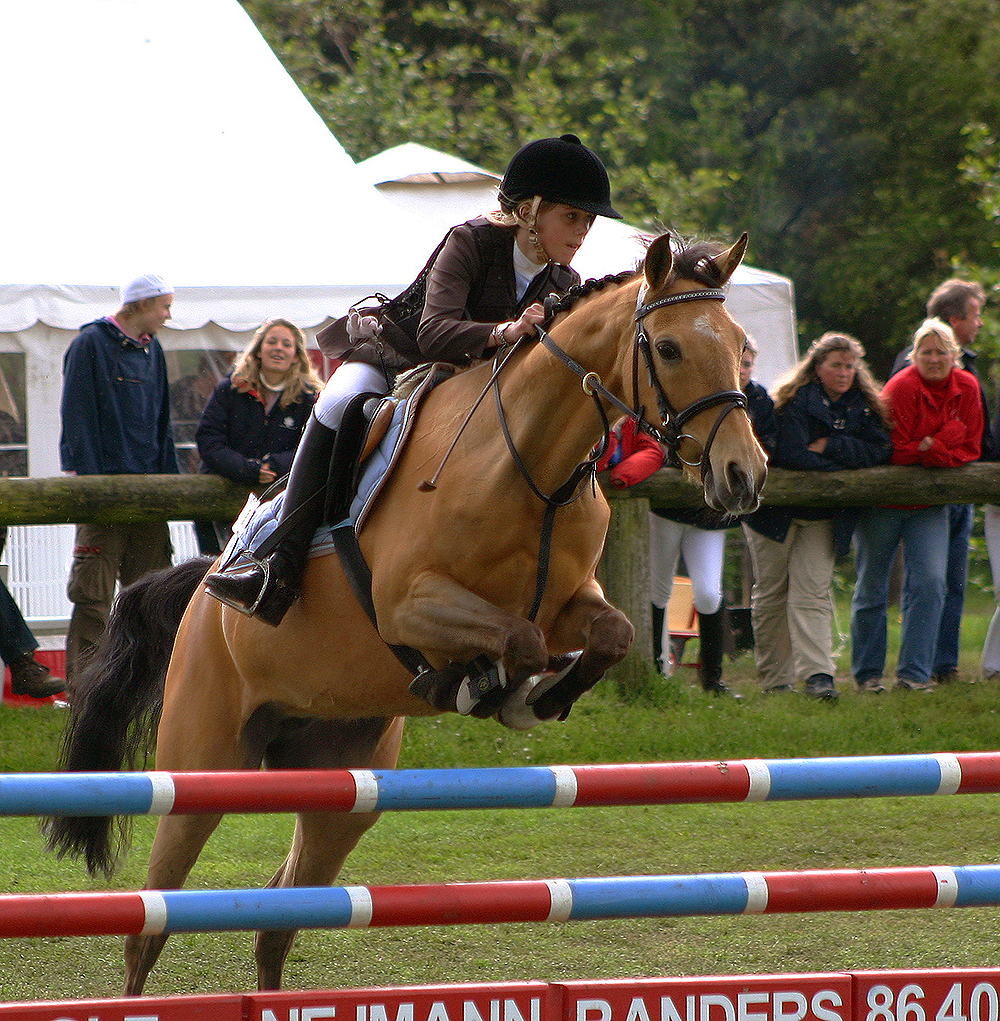
A youth competitor show jumping over obstacles in Denmark.

In sports, a variety of physical barriers or obstacles were introduced in the competition rules to make them even more difficult and competitive:

- in the athletics, there are barriers in obstacle running contests of 110 meters and 3000 meters, as well as in high jump and in pole vault;
- in equestrian competitions, there are also jumps over obstacles;
- in tennis and volleyball, a net stands as an obstacle that divides the court;
- in the cycling, motorcycle and motor racing, circuit designs are interposed with difficult paths to obstruct and render more difficult the competition;
- in team sports, like soccer, football, basketball and volleyball, attack players are hampered by defensive players, that make it difficult to move or throw the ball towards the goal;
- in other sports, such as Parkour, the competitor aims to move from one point to another in the most fluid and fast as possible, jumping obstacles of urban architecture that get in the way.
- Obstacle course racing

=== Economic ===
Can be defined as those elements of material deprivation that people may have to achieve certain goals, such as:

- the lack of money as an obstacle to the development of certain projects;
- the lack of water as an obstacle to the human capacity to produce certain crops on the field and to their own survival;
- the lack of light as an obstacle to mobility at night;
- the lack of electricity as an obstacle to the benefits provided by electronic devices and electrical machines;
- the lack of schools and teachers as obstacles to education and the fullness of citizenship;
- the lack of hospitals and physicians as obstacles to a system for the improvement of public health;
- the lack of transportation infrastructure as an obstacle to trade, industrial and tourism activities, among others, and to economic development.

=== Biopsychosocial and cultural ===
People are prevented to achieve certain goals by biological, psychological, social or cultural barriers, such as:

- diseases, as obstacles to human life in its fullness;
- physical disabilities as obstacles to the mobility of handicapped, which can be facilitated by accessibility resources;
- shyness as an obstacle to social relations;
- fear as an obstacle that prevents facing potential enemies or socio-political opponents, or facing possible economic barriers;
- social exclusion or the arrest of individuals as obstacles to socio-cultural integration into a community;
- the lack of psychomotor coordination as an obstacle to the development of qualified abilities;
- the level of mastery of the spoken idiom, or the differences between the spoken languages, as barriers to national or international social relations;
- the different religions as obstacles to the mutual moral understanding or interreligious dialogue, nationally or internationally;

=== Political ===
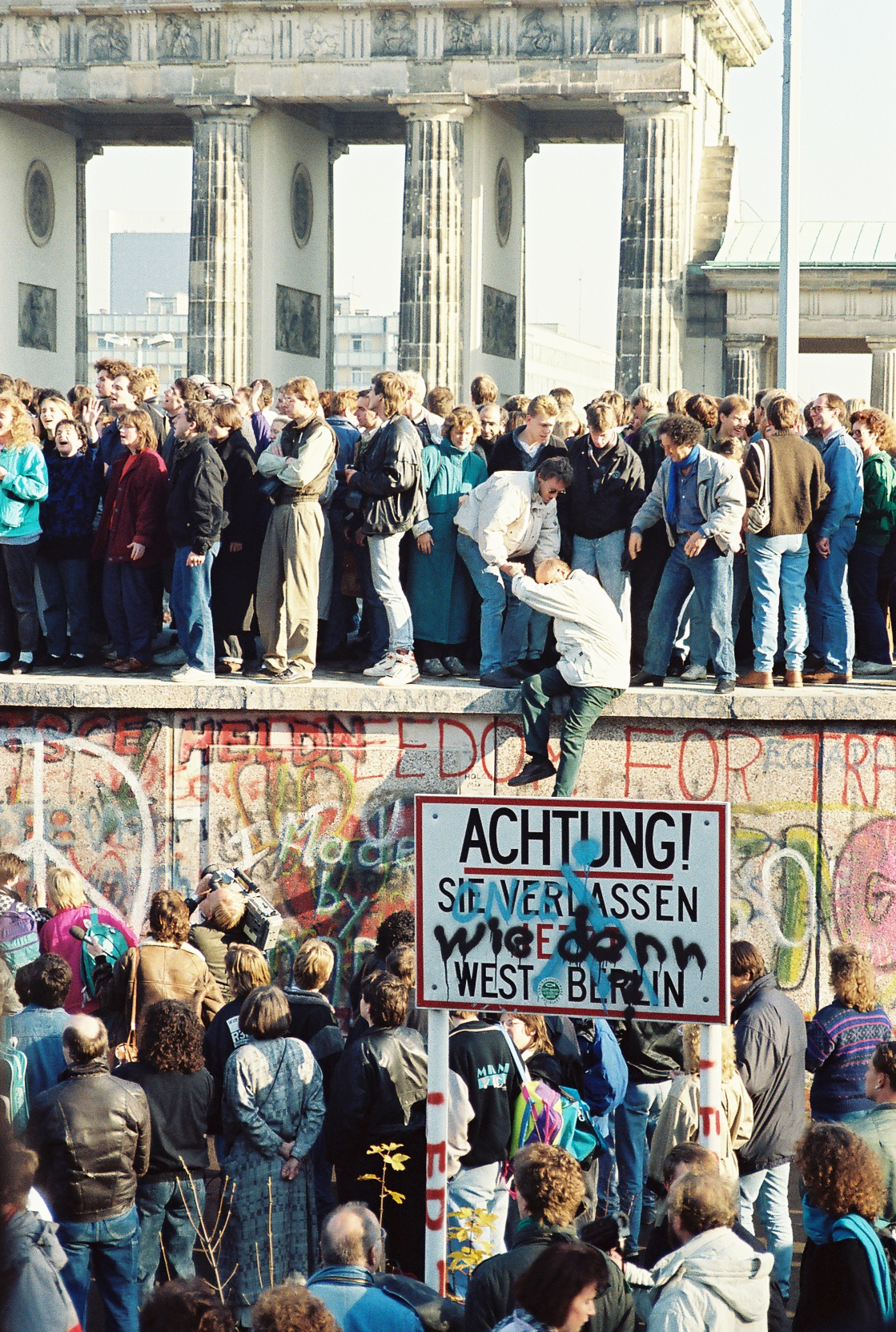
Berlin Wall at the Brandenburg Gate, 10 November 1989

Obstacles or difficulties which groups of citizens, their political representatives, political parties or countries interpose to each other in order to hinder the actions of certain of their opponents, such as:

- the prevention of a political minority group to achieving their aspirations in the parliament by the politically dominant voting majority, in the parliamentary procedure;
- the ideological repression, persecution and imprisonment for political reasons;
- the blocking of the international political and economic influence of a country by a multilateral treaty or alliance between countries opposed to such influence.

=== Technological ===
The improvement of living conditions of any human community is constantly challenged by the need of technologies still inaccessible or unavailable, which can be internally developed or acquired from other communities that have already developed them, and in both cases must overcome such barriers as:

- in the technology transfer between different countries, the trade and diplomatic negotiating skills with the countries which are providers of the desired new technologies;
- in the internal development approach, the educational level of the community or country, the accessible collection of specialized information, their technological and industrial base, their institutional level of scientific and technological research, development and innovation, and the level of practiced international collaboration.

=== Military ===
When different communities or countries, which border or not, cannot develop good relations, for economic, cultural or political reasons, they may exceed the limits of diplomatic negotiations, creating military defensive or offensive obstacles to their opponents or enemies, such as:

- building fortifications, entrenchments, barbed wire beds or mine fields, and other similar tactics intended to prevent or hinder movement of the enemy in a certain direction, and to protect your own forces from attack;
- blocking or destroying physical resources or logistic interconnections, such as bridges, highways, ports or airports, creating barriers to migration, trade, tourism, etc.;
- the invasion of the opponent's territory, seeking to block, destroy or use physical, logistical or strategic resources, in order to hinder existing threats.

== Image gallery ==
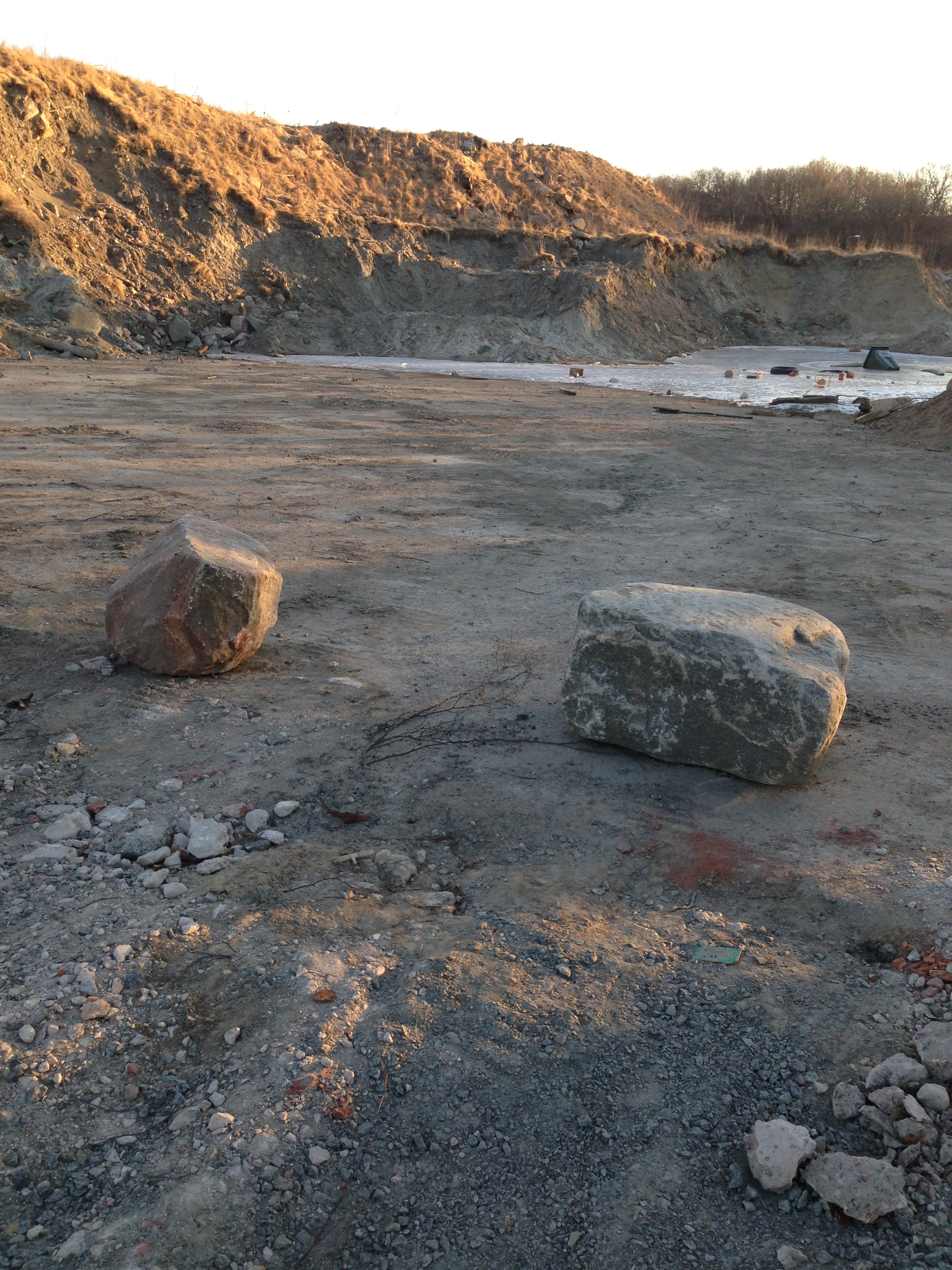
Two stones laid out to form an obstacle

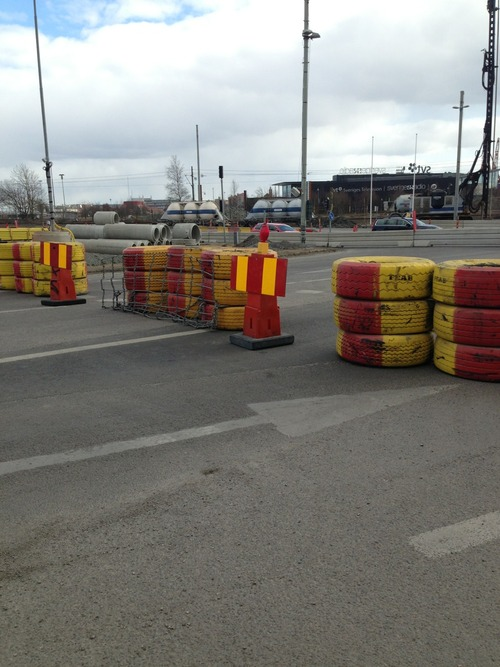
Roadblocks

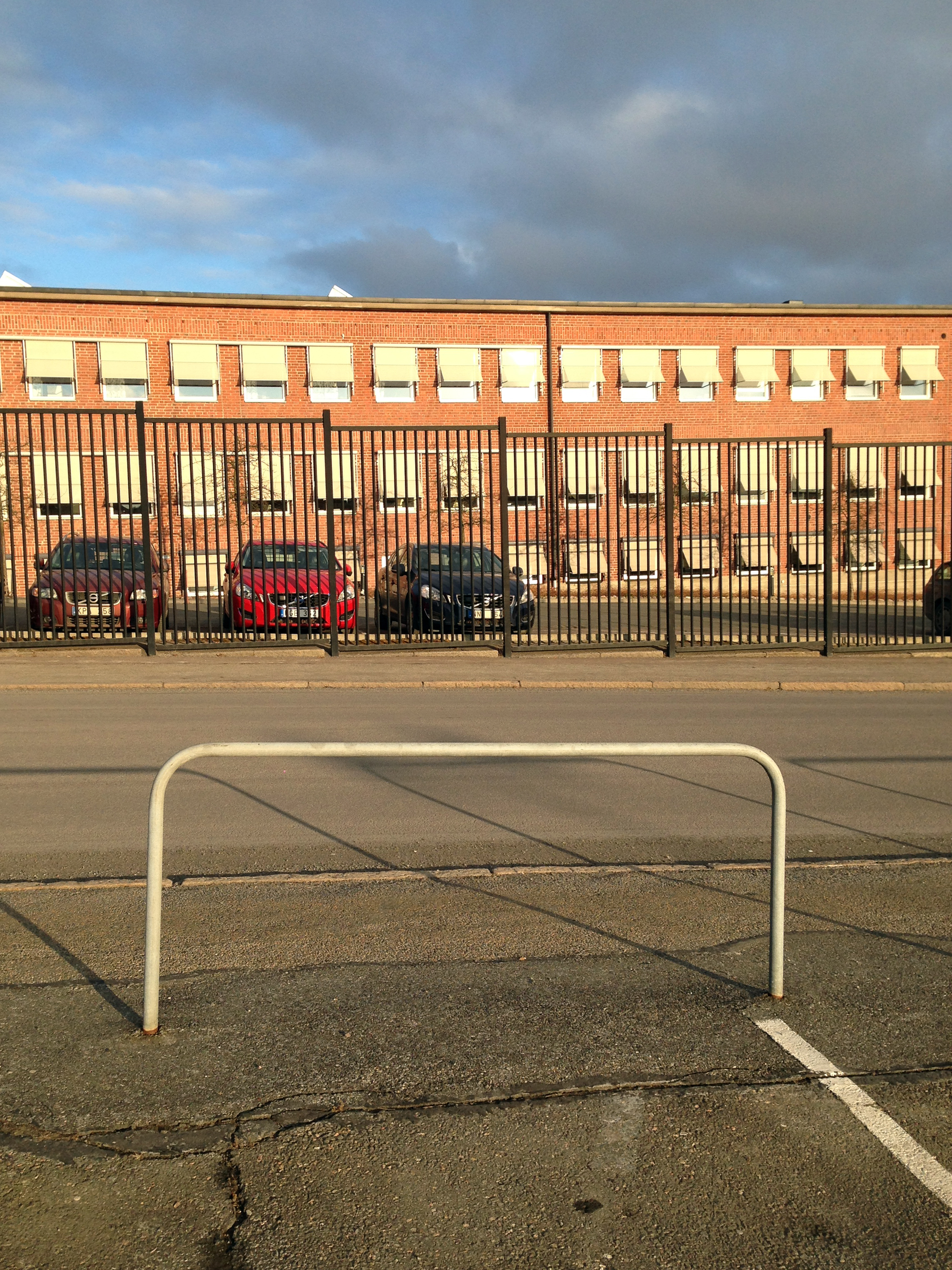
A metal bar and a metal fence constituting obstacles
