= Comparison of European road signs =

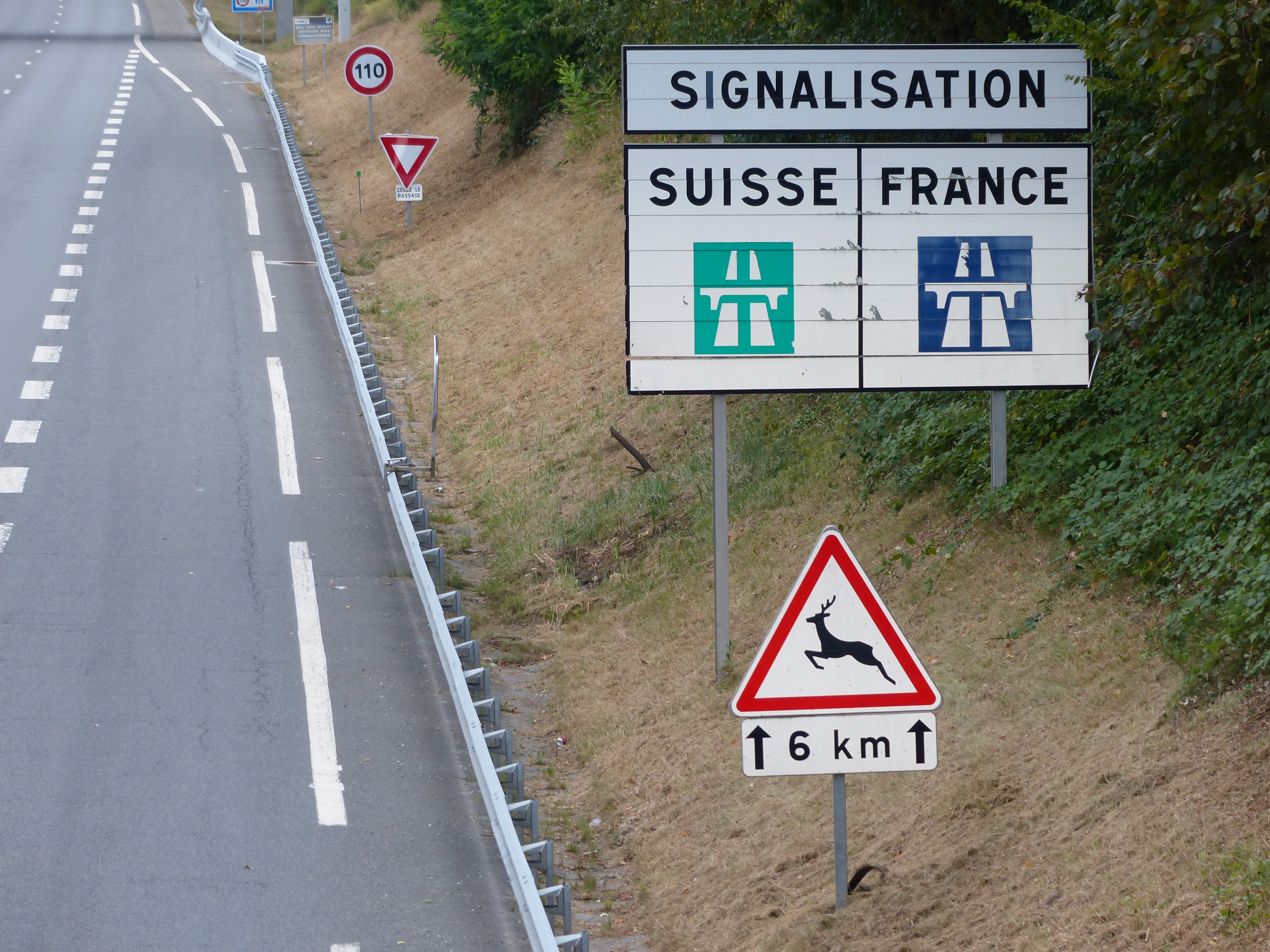
French sign showing the difference between French and Swiss motorway sign colours, on the A411 near Geneva

Nearly all European countries operate a broadly similar system of road signs, road markings and traffic signals, but there are noticeable differences mainly in:

- Graphic design details
- Local regulatory significance
- The colour-coding of directional signs
- Local language texts (sometimes bilingual)
- The meaning and colour-coding of horizontal road surface markings

Most European countries are party to the 1968 Vienna Convention on Road Signs and Signals and the associated European agreements supplementing it. A comparison of signage, however, reveals some significant differences at a national level—alongside less minor differences at a regional level.

== Standardisation ==
Example of a Swiss road sign

The 1968 Vienna Convention on Road Signs and Signals has been signed—but not necessarily ratified—by the following countries (including acceding states): Albania, Andorra, Armenia, Austria, Belarus, Belgium, Bosnia and Herzegovina, Bulgaria, Croatia, Cyprus, Czechia, Denmark, Estonia, Finland, France, Georgia, Germany, Greece, Hungary, Italy, Latvia, Liechtenstein, Lithuania, Luxembourg, Moldova, Montenegro, the Netherlands, North Macedonia, Norway, Poland, Portugal, Romania, Russia, San Marino, Serbia, Slovakia, Slovenia, Spain, Sweden, Switzerland, Turkey, Ukraine, and the United Kingdom.

The Convention has not been signed by Iceland, Ireland or Malta, but these countries are nonetheless largely consistent with the key tenets of the system that the Convention establishes.

== Graphic differences ==
- Warning signs in Ireland are yellow and diamond-shaped (as in countries using Manual on Uniform Traffic Control Devices-influenced traffic signs), and thus differ from the white or yellow, red-bordered, triangular signs found in the rest of Europe
- The design of individual pictograms (tunnel, pedestrian, car, etc.), while broadly similar, often varies in detail from country to country
- Type of arrows may be different
- Fonts of written words

== Directional and informatory signage ==
The colour, shape, text style (bold, capitals etc.), or even an additional sign (pictogram, route number, etc.) of the signage give information about the road class of the indicated route.

Country	Motorways (Controlled-access highways)	Expressways (Limited-access roads)	Outside urban areas				Local destinations	Tourist signs	Temporary detour
Country	Motorways (Controlled-access highways)	Expressways (Limited-access roads)	Primary routes		Secondary routes	Regional destinations	Local destinations	Tourist signs	Temporary detour
Albania	TIRANË	SHKODER	KUDHES		n/a	n/a	Qender	Plazhi i Zaroshkes	DURRES
Armenia	ՍԵՎԱՆ; SEVAN	ԵՐԵՎԱՆ; YEREVAN	ԳՅՈՒՄՐԻ; GYUMRI		n/a	n/a	ՀՅՈՒՐ. ԱՆԻ ՊԼԱԶԱ; HOTEL ANI PLAZA	ՎԱՅՈՑ ՁՈՐ; VAYOTS DZOR	Շրջանցման ուղղություն DETOUR
Austria	Salzburg	Wien	Villach		n/a	Salzkammergut (Note: Used to indicate locations like regions, city centres, city districts and tourist locations. In reality, there is no clearcut and consistent usage of the white on green signs; for city centres and city districts, black on white signals are often preferred if the roads leading to them are primary roads.)			Umleitung
Belarus	МІНСК	ГОМЕЛЬ	МАГІЛЁЎ		n/a	n/a	вул. ФІЛІМОНАВА	КАСЦЁЛ СВЯТОГА МІХАІЛА	аб'езд
Belgium	Brussel	Kortrijk; Courtrai	Gent; Gand		n/a	n/a	Centrum; Centre; Zentrum	Atomium	Wegomlegging; Déviation; Umleitung
Belgium	Bruxelles (Note: The directional signs to motorways are white on green, whereas the directional signs on motorways are white on blue. Compare sign F31 of the Belgian Road Code in green (a directional sign to a motorway, but not on a motorway) with the other directional signs in blue (especially F15, F25, F27 and F29, all of which are also used in blue on motorways): "Code de la route - Article 71. Signaux d'indication (F1-F31)".)	Kortrijk; Courtrai	Gent; Gand		n/a	n/a	Centrum; Centre; Zentrum	Atomium	Wegomlegging; Déviation; Umleitung
Bosnia and Herzegovina	Sarajevo; Сарајево	Banja Luka; Бања Лука	Mostar; Мостар		n/a	n/a	Centar; Центар	Međugorje	Obilazak; Обилазак
Bulgaria	София; Sofia	Русе; Ruse	Варна; Varna		n/a	n/a	Център; Centre	Етър; Etar	Варна; Varna
Croatia	Zagreb	Bjelovar	Osijek		n/a	n/a	Centar	Plitvička jezera	Obilazak
Croatia	Zagreb	Bjelovar	Osijek		n/a	n/a	Zračna luka (Note: Used for services and objects like stations, hospitals etc. See: Pravilnik o turističkoj i ostaloj signalizaciji na cestama. Retrieved on 2022-08-07.)	Plitvička jezera	Obilazak
Czechia	BRNO	PRAHA	VYŠKOV		n/a	SLOVANY	Letiště	Hrad Bouzov	PRAHA
Denmark	Aarhus	n/a	Skanderborg (Note: Directional signs that are mounted overhead on multi-lane primary roads are white on blue.)		n/a	n/a	Stadion	Himmelbjerget	Nakskov
Estonia	n/a	TALLINN	HAAPSALU		n/a	n/a	MUSTAMÄE	Pirita klooster	ÜMBERSÕIT
Finland	HELSINKI; HELSINGFORS	LAPPEENRANTA	PORVOO; BORGÅ		n/a	KYMINLINNA	Kirjasto	Hiidenkivi	TURKU
France	PARIS	MARSEILLE	BEAUVAIS (Note: Used to indicate major directions)	TOULON	LA CHAPELLE	n/a	Gare S.N.C.F.	PARC NATUREL	Déviation
Germany	Hamburg	Freiburg (Note: German traffic law does not recognise the category of "expressways", but there are certain roads commonly referred to as "autobahnähnliche Straßen" ("roads similar to motorways") which, while not being "motorways" in a legal sense, have a very similar profile to motorways. The signs on such roads are not white on blue (as on motorways), but normally black on yellow as on most other primary roads or, in exceptional cases, black on white as on local roads.)	Lübeck		n/a	n/a	Bahnhof	Burg Eltz	Umleitung
Greece	Θεσσαλονίκη; Thessaloniki	Πάτρα; Patra	Αθήνα; Athina		n/a	n/a	Κέντρο; Centre	Ακρόπολη; Akropolis	Εύοσμος; Evosmos
Hungary	Budapest	Vác	Gyöngyös		n/a	n/a	◉ Centrum	Vár	Gödöllő
Iceland	n/a	n/a	Akureyri		n/a	Garðabær	Flugstöð	n/a	Hjáleið
Ireland	Áth Cliath; DUBLIN	n/a	Tulach Mhór; TULLAMORE (Note: National primary & secondary roads. Route numbers are written in yellow.)		Seantrabh; SANTRY (Note: Regional & local roads)	n/a	n/a	An Bhóireann; THE BURREN	Cúrsa Timpill; DETOUR
Italy	VENEZIA	UDINE	BORGOSOLE		n/a	n/a	aeroporto	Colfosco	deviazione
Latvia	n/a	RĪGA	LIEPĀJA		n/a	n/a	centrs	KURZEMES ŠVEICE	DAUGAVPILS
Liechtenstein	St. Gallen	Chur	Schaan		Vaduz	n/a	Bahnhof	Burg	Umleitung
Lithuania	VILNIUS	KAUNAS	MARIJAMPOLĖ		n/a	n/a	CENTRAS	Kernavės archeologinė vietovė	Apylanka
Montenegro	Podgorica	Bar	Herceg Novi		n/a	n/a	Centar	Skadarsko Jezero	Obilazak
Netherlands	A 44 Amsterdam	Den Haag	Arnhem N 50		n/a	n/a	Centrum	Nationaal Park	OMLEIDING; Volg A (Note: On non-motorways only)
Norway	Nannestad	Lillestrøm	Trondheim		n/a	n/a	Sykehus	Kvitsand	Bergen
Poland	Warszawa	Poznań	Suwałki		n/a	n/a	Centrum	Kraków	Objazd
Portugal	Lisboa	n/a	Portalegre		Fig.^{ra} Foz (Note: Certain town names may be abbreviated, in this case for Figueira da Foz)	ALGARVE (Note: Regional destinations and cardinal directions are written fully in uppercase (e.g. "ALGARVE" or "NORTE"), with the text and background colors being accordingly with the type of road)	centro	castelo	Desvio
Romania	Cluj-Napoca	Craiova	Baia Mare		n/a	n/a	Centru	Castelul Bran	Ocolire
Russia	БЕЛГОРОД; BELGOROD	МОСКВА	ТЮМЕНЬ		n/a	ЛИПЕЦК	ул. ЛЕНИНА	музей-усадьба Н. К. РЕРИХА	объезд
Serbia	Београд; Beograd	Крагујевац; Kragujevac	Зрењанин; Zrenjanin		Сомбор (Note: Town names on regional and local roads are displayed only in Cyrillic, and in the languages of national minorities where they exist.)	n/a	Центар; Centar	Студеница; Studenica	Обилазак; Obilazak
Slovakia	Košice	Nitra	Bratislava		n/a	n/a	Centrum	Hrad	obchádzka
Slovenia	Maribor	Nova Gorica	Medvode		n/a	n/a	Center	Postojnska jama	Obvoz
Spain	Villalba (Note: Next to AUTOPISTA also used for AUTOVÍA and AUTOBIA)	Córdoba (Note: Vía reservada para automóviles)	Oviedo / Uviéu (Note: vía rápida)	PINTO (Note: carretera convencional)	BADAJOZ	n/a	centro	Navacerrada	DESVÍO
Sweden	GÖTEBORG	STOCKHOLM	FALUN		n/a	NORRMALM	Vårdcentral	Långe Erik	NYKÖPING
Switzerland	Basel	Chiasso	Moudon		Ftan	n/a	Gare CFF	Castello	Umleitung; Déviation; Deviazione
Türkiye	İstanbul	n/a	Ankara		n/a	n/a	Şehir Merkezi	Dara Antik Kenti	n/a
Ukraine	Київ; Kyiv	Жашків; Zhashkiv	Рудня; Rudnia		n/a	n/a	◉ Центр	Борисоглібська церква	об'їзд detour
United Kingdom	Nottingham M1	n/a (Note: There is no expressway class of road in the UK)	Inbhir Nis; Inverness; A9 (Note: In Scotland, some signs are bilingual, with Scottish Gaelic text shown on top and in yellow.)		Tyddewi; St Davids (Note: In Wales, all signs are bilingual, with Welsh text shown on top in the same colour as English text.)	The NORTH (Note: Regional destinations consist of upper case cardinal destinations and regions (e.g. "The NORTH" or "The SOUTH WEST") and are only used on motorway and primary road signs)	Village Hall	Thorpe Park	Diversion

== Different typefaces in texts ==
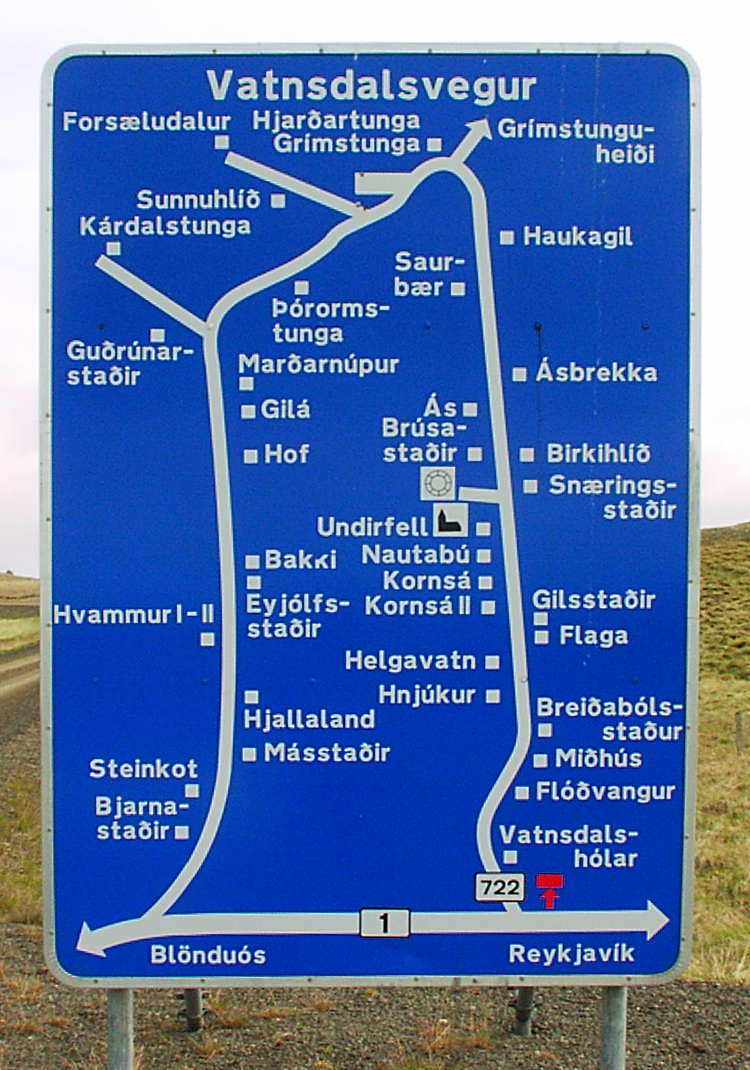
A sign with the use of Transport font in Icelandic

- Andorra officially uses the Swiss 721 (Black Condensed) typeface, which is identical to Helvetica. However, some signs use the Caractères and Carretera Convencional typefaces.
- Austria and Slovakia use the Tern typeface. Austria used the Austria typeface until 2010. Slovakia used the Universal Grotesk typeface from Czechoslovakia era until 2014.
- Azerbaijan, Belarus, Greece, North Macedonia, Malta, Moldova, Russia, Slovenia, Turkey and Ukraine use the Arial Bold and/or Helvetica Bold typefaces in mixture with other official typefaces.
- Armenia, Azerbaijan, Belarus, Georgia, Lithuania, Moldova, Russia and Ukraine use typefaces based on one specified in the Soviet standard GOST 10807–78. In Russia, the modern standard is GOST R 52290–2004. In Belarus, the according standard is STB 1140–2013 (formerly STB 1140–99). In Ukraine, it is DSTU 4100–2002.
  - Ukraine has recently started using the Road UA typeface, as part of a signage redesign according to DSTU 4100:2021.
- Belgium, Bosnia and Herzegovina, Bulgaria, Croatia, Montenegro, North Macedonia, Romania, Slovenia, and Serbia use the SNV typeface. Liechtenstein and Switzerland used this typeface until 2003.
- Cyprus uses the Helvetica typeface.
- Denmark uses the Dansk Vejtavleskrift typeface. The typeface is derived from the British Transport typeface.
- Estonia uses the Arial Narrow Bold typeface.
- Finland uses a typeface developed in the 1960s by the former national board of roads and waterways.
- France uses the Caractères typeface.
  - In the French Basque Country a lighter variant of Helvetica is used for Basque language place names.
- Germany, Czechia and Latvia use the DIN 1451 typeface.
- Greece uses a modified version of the British Transport typeface on most regular roads; motorway signs use a modified version of DIN 1451.
- Hungary does not use a defined typeface as the letters are defined one-by-one in the national regulation. The typeface resembles the DIN 1451 typeface closely.
- Italy, Albania and San Marino use the Alfabeto Normale typeface (with the narrow variant Alfabeto Stretto), a heavier version of the British Transport typeface.
- Luxembourg uses the Helvetica, Caractères and SNV typefaces, often inconsistently.
- The Netherlands uses typefaces derived from FHWA typeface: ANWB/RWS Cc (narrow), Dd (medium) and Ee (wide).
- Norway uses the Trafikkalfabetet typeface.
- Poland does not use a defined typeface as the letters are defined one-by-one in the national regulation. There are three typefaces resembling the defined one, with two of them distributed as non-commercial freeware – Drogowskaz and Tablica drogowa typefaces. The third one, fully compliant with the regulation is only available for road sign manufacturers.
- Spain uses the Carretera Convencional (also known as CCRIGE) typeface, which is derived from the British Transport typeface, and is almost identical to the Italian Alfabeto Normale. Until 2014, Autopista (derived from FHWA series E modified) was used for motorways.
- Sweden and Åland use the Tratex typeface. Åland formerly used the Finnish typeface in mixture with Tratex.
- Switzerland and Liechtenstein use the ASTRA-Frutiger typeface since 2003.
- Turkey uses two typefaces derived from the FHWA typeface. O-Serisi is used for motorways and E-Serisi is used for all other roads.
- The United Kingdom, Iceland, Ireland, Malta and Portugal use the Transport typeface. An oblique variant of Transport is used in Ireland for Irish text.
  - Motorway typeface is used for route numbers on United Kingdom and Ireland motorways, and for exit and route numbers in Portugal.

In Albania, Armenia, Andorra, Belarus, Czechia, Estonia, Finland. France, Greece (partly), Italy, Latvia, Lithuania, Moldova, Monaco, Russia, San Marino and Sweden, destinations on direction signs are written in capital letters. In Ireland, they are written in all-capital letters in English and in mixed-case letters in Irish. In Austria, Belgium, Bosnia and Herzegovina, Bulgaria, Croatia, Denmark, Germany, Greece (partly), Hungary, Iceland, Liechtenstein, Luxembourg, Montenegro, Netherlands, North Macedonia, Norway, Poland, Romania, Serbia, Slovakia, Slovenia, Switzerland, Turkey and Ukraine both capital and lowercase are used. In Spain, destinations reached by motorway are written in capital and lowercase, while those reached by other roads are written in capital letters. In the United Kingdom and Portugal, regional destinations names and cardinal directions are written in capital letters, while the remaining destinations names are written in capital and lowercase.

== Differences in meanings ==
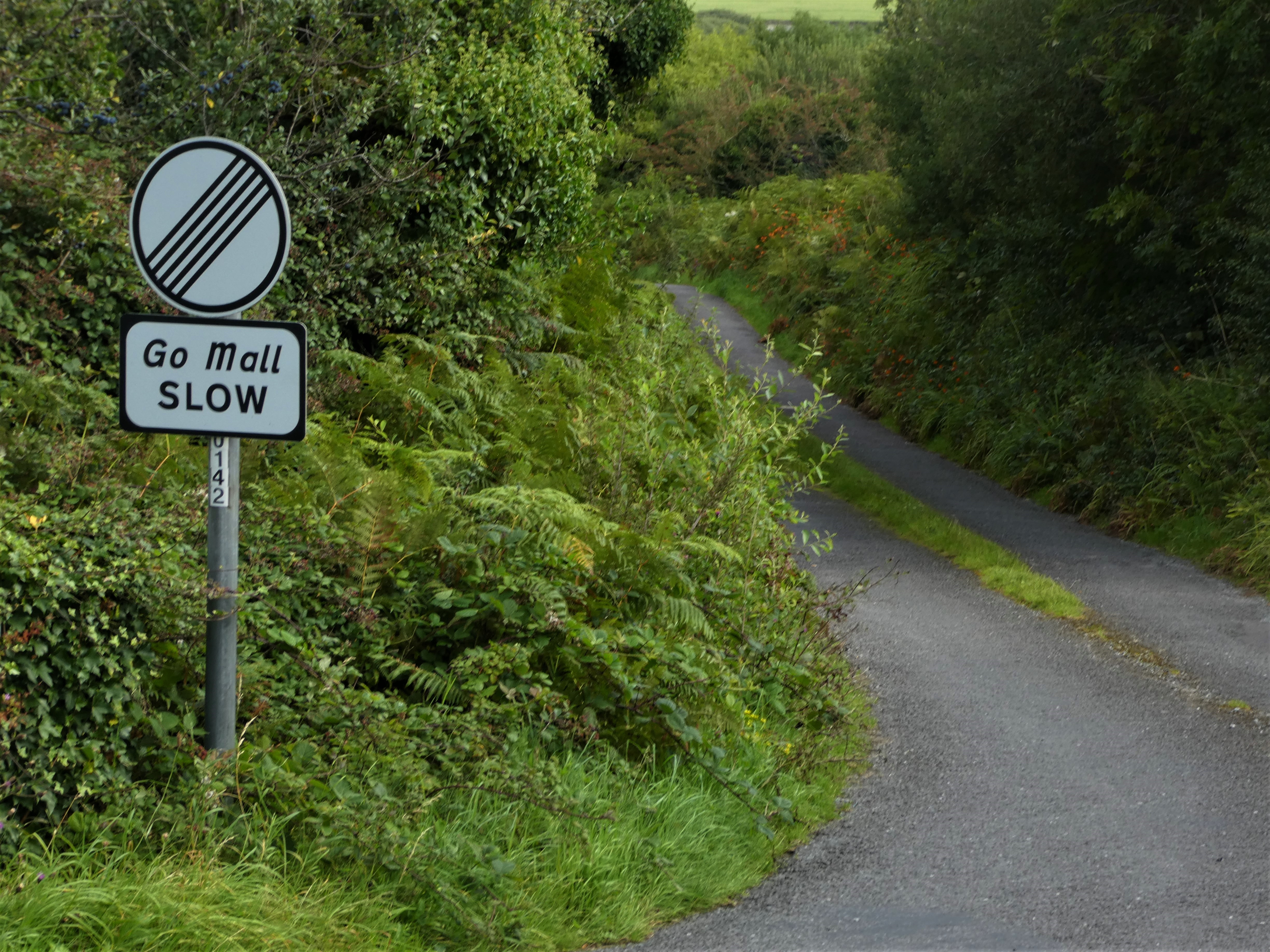
Irish rural speed limit sign on a local road

- Sometimes similar signs have minor differences in meanings, following the local traffic codes.
  - The United Kingdom's "pass either side" sign indicates that drivers may pass on either side of an obstacle, such as a traffic island, to reach the same destination.
  - The Irish "rural speed limit" sign takes the appearance of that used to denote the end of all previously signed restrictions used elsewhere in Europe, but actually indicates a speed limit of 60 km/h. It is always accompanied with a "SLOW" supplementary plate.
- All European countries use the SI system (distances in kilometres or metres; speeds in kilometres per hour; heights, widths and lengths in metres; weights in tonnes) with the exception of the United Kingdom, where distances and speeds are still indicated in imperial measurements (miles or yards and miles per hour). Since 2016, on width and height limit signs both metric and imperial measurements are used (metres and feet & inches), however older signs still show imperial-only measurements. Weight limits have been expressed in metric tonnes since 1981, but signs continued to use an upper case "T" until 2011.

== Road surface markings ==
- Longitudinal lines (lanes and margins) and symbols on the carriageway are always white (but in Norway a yellow line separates two-way traffic and in Ireland edge lines are yellow). Temporary markings are yellow in Germany, France, Italy, the Netherlands and Spain, but red/orange in Liechtenstein, Switzerland and Russia, and white in the United Kingdom.
- A stop line is always represented by a white thick traversal continuous line, but a give way line may be represented by a white thick dashed line as rectangles (Germany, France, Spain) or by a double-dashed line (United Kingdom) or by a white line of triangles (Austria, Italy, Liechtenstein, the Netherlands, Norway, Sweden and Switzerland). In Ireland, give way markings are represented by a single dashed line; on one way streets and entrances to roundabouts it is instead represented by a combination of a single solid line and a single dashed line.
- A disc (time-limited) parking place is identified by white lines in Germany and by blue lines in Liechtenstein, the Netherlands, France, Spain, and Switzerland. A chargeable parking place is identified by white lines in Germany, France, Liechtenstein, the Netherlands, and Switzerland and by blue lines in Italy, Spain and Russia. A parking place reserved for disabled people is bordered in white in Germany, the Netherlands, Spain and the United Kingdom; in yellow in Italy, Liechtenstein and Switzerland; and in blue in France. Other reserved parking places (bus, taxis) are bordered with yellow lines in Italy, Liechtenstein, Spain, Switzerland, and the United Kingdom, but with white lines in Germany.
- The prohibition of roadside parking can be indicated by a yellow continuous line (Spain, the Republic of Ireland, and the United Kingdom), by a yellow dashed line (Austria, the Netherlands and France), by a yellow dashed line with X's (Liechtenstein and Switzerland), a white continuous line (Italy), or else by black-and-white (the Netherlands) or a black-and-yellow (the Netherlands and Italy) kerb markings. Only in the United Kingdom and the Republic of Ireland does a double yellow line (as well as a white zig-zag line in the vicinity of pedestrian crossings) mean "no parking at any time".
- The prohibition of stopping / waiting can be indicated by a yellow continuous line (Austria, the Netherlands, France, Liechtenstein, Switzerland and Russia), and in (certain cities of) the United Kingdom by a red continuous line (with double red lines extending the meaning to "no stopping at any time). In the United Kingdom, a yellow zig-zag line near hospitals, police stations, and schools means "no stopping".

== Traffic signs comparisons for all countries ==
Direct comparison tables between different categories of traffic signs in every country are illustrated in several gallery articles listed below:

Category	Priority	Warning	Prohibitory	Mandatory	Special regulations	Indication	De-restrictions	Built-up area limits	Checkpoint	Directions
Description	Stop	Traffic queues	No motor vehicles	Turn right	Pedestrian crossing	Hospital (emergency)	End of living street	Entrance	Toll charge	... for different road categories
Examples	Czechia Greece Turkey	Ireland Portugal Sweden	Netherlands Finland Switzerland	Belgium Spain United Kingdom	Bulgaria Iceland Poland	Latvia Moldova Switzerland	Bosnia and Herzegovina Denmark North Macedonia	Denmark France Romania	Germany Iceland Serbia	Croatia Germany Poland Lithuania

== See also ==
- Comparison of European traffic laws
- Traffic signs in post-Soviet states
- Road signs in the European microstates
- Road signs in Albania
- Road signs in Armenia
- Road signs in Austria
- Road signs in Azerbaijan
- Road signs in Belarus
- Road signs in Belgium
- Road signs in Bosnia and Herzegovina
- Road signs in Bulgaria
- Road signs in Croatia
- Road signs in Cyprus
- Road signs in Czechia
- Road signs in Denmark
- Road signs in Estonia
- Road signs in Finland
- Road signs in France
- Road signs in Georgia
- Road signs in Germany
- Road signs in Greece
- Road signs in Hungary
- Road signs in Iceland
- Road signs in Ireland
- Road signs in Italy
- Road signs in Kazakhstan
- Road signs in Latvia
- Road signs in Lithuania
- Road signs in Malta
- Road signs in Moldova
- Road signs in Montenegro
- Road signs in the Netherlands
- Road signs in Norway
- Road signs in Poland
- Road signs in Portugal
- Road signs in Romania
- Road signs in Russia
- Road signs in Serbia
- Road signs in Slovakia
- Road signs in Slovenia
- Road signs in Spain
- Road signs in Sweden
- Road signs in Switzerland and Liechtenstein
- Road signs in Turkey
- Road signs in Ukraine
- Road signs in the United Kingdom

== Sources ==
- European Standard for Traffic Signs - EN 12899-1:2001 Fixed, Vertical Road Traffic Signs – Part 1: Fixed Signs, Requirements
