= Speed limits in Estonia =

National speed limits of Estonia

As per Estonian traffic act § 15, the general speed limits in Estonia are:

- 50 km/h in built-up area
- 90 km/h on roads outside built-up areas
- 110 - 120 km/h on selected roads during summer months, unless road is equipped with electronic speed signs, then the speed limit depends on daylight and road conditions.

110 km/h is allowed, generally only dual carriageways with at least two lanes in each direction, and the scope is reconsidered from year to year.

100 km/h is allowed on some dual carriageways in winter.

== See also ==
- Comparison of European traffic laws
- Transport in Estonia
