= Road signs in Cyprus =

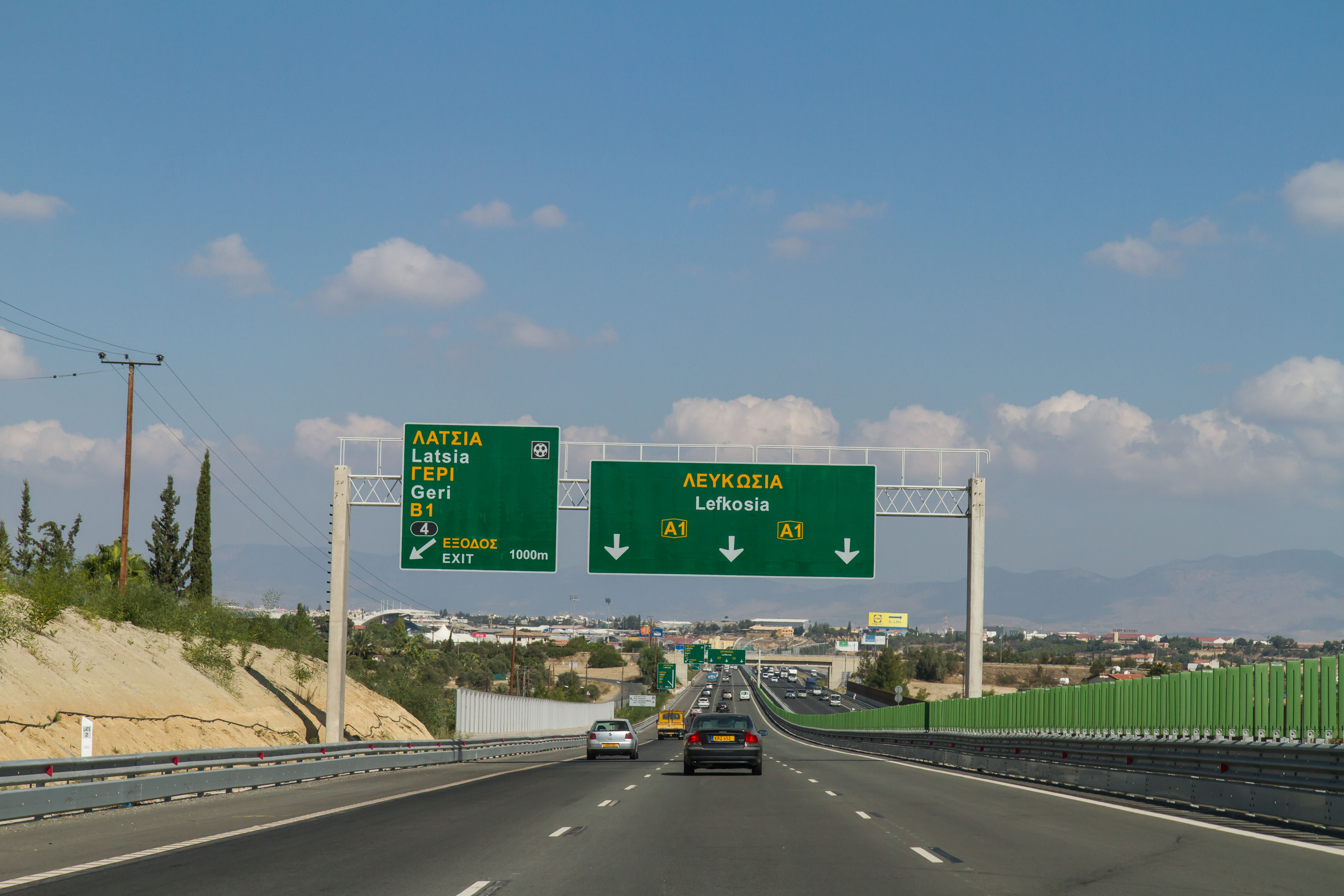
Directional sign on A1 motorway near Nicosia

Road signs in Cyprus are regulated in the Highway Code (Greek: Κώδικας Οδικής Κυκλοφορίας, romanized: Kódikas Odikís Kykloforías). They follow the road signs used in most European countries, having acceded to the Vienna Convention on Road Signs and Signals on 16 August 2016.

Road signs in Cyprus are similar to road signs used in the United Kingdom since the country was a British colony until 1960 when Cyprus became an independent republic. Some signs are similar to road signs used in Greece. Exceptions to this are that inscriptions on road signs are in Greek and Latin scripts, and that metric system units are used instead of imperial units. The same applies to Akrotiri and Dhekelia where some road signs are in Turkish as well as English and Greek. Cyprus drives on the left.

== Categorisation ==
=== Warning signs ===
Warning signs in Cyprus have a triangular shape with a red border and a white background, as in most European countries, while in Greece, warning signs have a yellow background instead of white.

Traffic signals ahead

Crossroads

T-junction

Side road

Staggered junction

Traffic merges from the left

Traffic merges onto the main carriageway

Roundabout

Bend to right (left if symbol reversed)

Double bend first to the left (right if symbol reversed)

Junction on a bend (symbols may be reversed)

Junction on a bend (symbols may be reversed)

Road narrows on both sides

Road narrows on the right (left if symbols reversed)

End of dual carriageway

Two-way traffic

Two-way traffic on route crossing ahead

Steep descent

Steep ascent

Opening or swing bridge

Riverbank or quayside

Water course alongside road

Soft verges

Soft verges

Tunnel

Hump bridge

Uneven road

Risk of grounding at level crossing ahead

Slippery road

Side winds

Low-flying aircraft or sudden aircraft noise

Low-flying helicopters or sudden helicopter noise

Falling or fallen rocks

Traffic queues likely ahead

Slow-moving military vehicles likely to be in or crossing the road

Slow-moving vehicles

Electrified overhead cable ahead

Ice or Snowdrifts

Other dangers (plate must be used to indicate the hazard)

Zebra crossing

Children ahead

Pedestrians ahead

Frail pedestrians likely to cross

School ahead

Horse-drawn vehicles likely to be in the road

Accompanied horses or ponies likely to be in or crossing the road

Wild horses or ponies

Wild animals

Agricultural vehicles

Cattle

Tramway

Give way ahead (200 m)

Stop ahead (50 m)

=== Additional markings ===
Distance to level crossing

Obstacle

Obstacle left

Obstacle right

=== Regulatory signs ===
==== Prohibitory or restriction signs ====
No hand vehicles

No motorcycles

No mopeds

No pedestrians

No motor vehicles

No tractors

No horse-drawn vehicles

Toll post

No horn

Customs

Minimum distance

No motor vehicles (both car and motorcycle)

Traffic has priority over vehicles from the opposite direction

Road closed to all vehicles in both directions

No vehicles with a maximum width beyond 2 meters

No vehicles with a maximum height exceeding 3.8 meters

No goods vehicles exceeding a weight of 7.5 tonnes

No goods vehicles

No towed caravans

No Entry for vehicular traffic

No right turn for vehicular traffic

No left turn for vehicular traffic

Maximum speed limit

End of maximum speed limit

Priority must be given to vehicles from the opposite direction

No overtaking

End of no overtaking

No overtaking by goods vehicles

Maximum single weight

End of all local bans on moving vehicles

Maximum length

No water heavy vehicles

Maximum heavy

Vehicles carrying explosives (such as fireworks) prohibited.

No U-turns for vehicular traffic

==== Other regulatory signs ====
Police

Stop sign

Priority road

End of priority road

Stop, crossroads by children

Go ahead or proceed for temporary road works using a hand sign

Give way

Controlled block stopping is prohibited except when waiting for a right turn

==== No parking signs ====
No parking

No stopping

No parking on odd days

No parking on even days

No parking zone

End of no parking zone

==== Mandatory signs ====
Go straight ahead only

Turn left

Turn right

Turn left ahead

Turn right ahead

Go straight or turn left ahead

Go straight or turn right ahead

Turn left or right ahead

Keep left

Keep right

Pass on either side

Roundabout

One-way traffic

One-way lateral road

Minimum speed limit

End of minimum speed limit

Snow chains mandatory

Horse street mandatory

Pedestrian road mandatory

=== Signs for traffic reduction measures ===
Curving road surface, the speed limit is set at 50 km/h

Curving road surface, the speed limit is set at 30 km/h

Humped crossing

Humped pellcan crossing

School

Road humps left

Road humps right

Road humps

Living street

End of living street

=== Information signs ===
Confirmation sign

Direction sign

Direction sign

Direction sign

Bus stop

Pedestrian crossing

Parking

Dead end straight ahead

Dead end left

Dead end right

Emergency phone

Express road

End of expressway

Open road (Only for vehicles with snow chains)

Warning for driving on the left (in Akrotiri and Dhekelia)

Vehicle exit

General speed limits. Caution. You are driving on the left hand side!

Direction sign at a roundabout

Confirmation sign

Built-up area

=== Additional signs ===
Allowed only for disabled vehicles

Principle of validity of a no stopping and parking sign placed perpendicular to the axis of the street

Repetition of the validity of a stop and parking prohibition sign placed perpendicular to the axis of the street

End of validity of a stop and parking prohibition sign placed perpendicular to the axis of the street

Distance from the sign to the dangerous point or area of prohibition or restriction

Length of the hazardous section or area in which a prohibition or restriction applies

Principle of validity of a no stopping and parking sign placed parallel to the axis of the street. The validity of the plate extends over [e.g. 10 m] from the position of the sign and in the direction of the arrow

Reminder of the validity of a no stopping and parking sign placed parallel to the axis of the street. The validity of the plate extends over (e.g. 5m) on both sides of the sign's location.

Icy road

Direction of priority road

== Other signs ==
=== Street name signs ===
Street name sign in Larnaca, Dryadon street

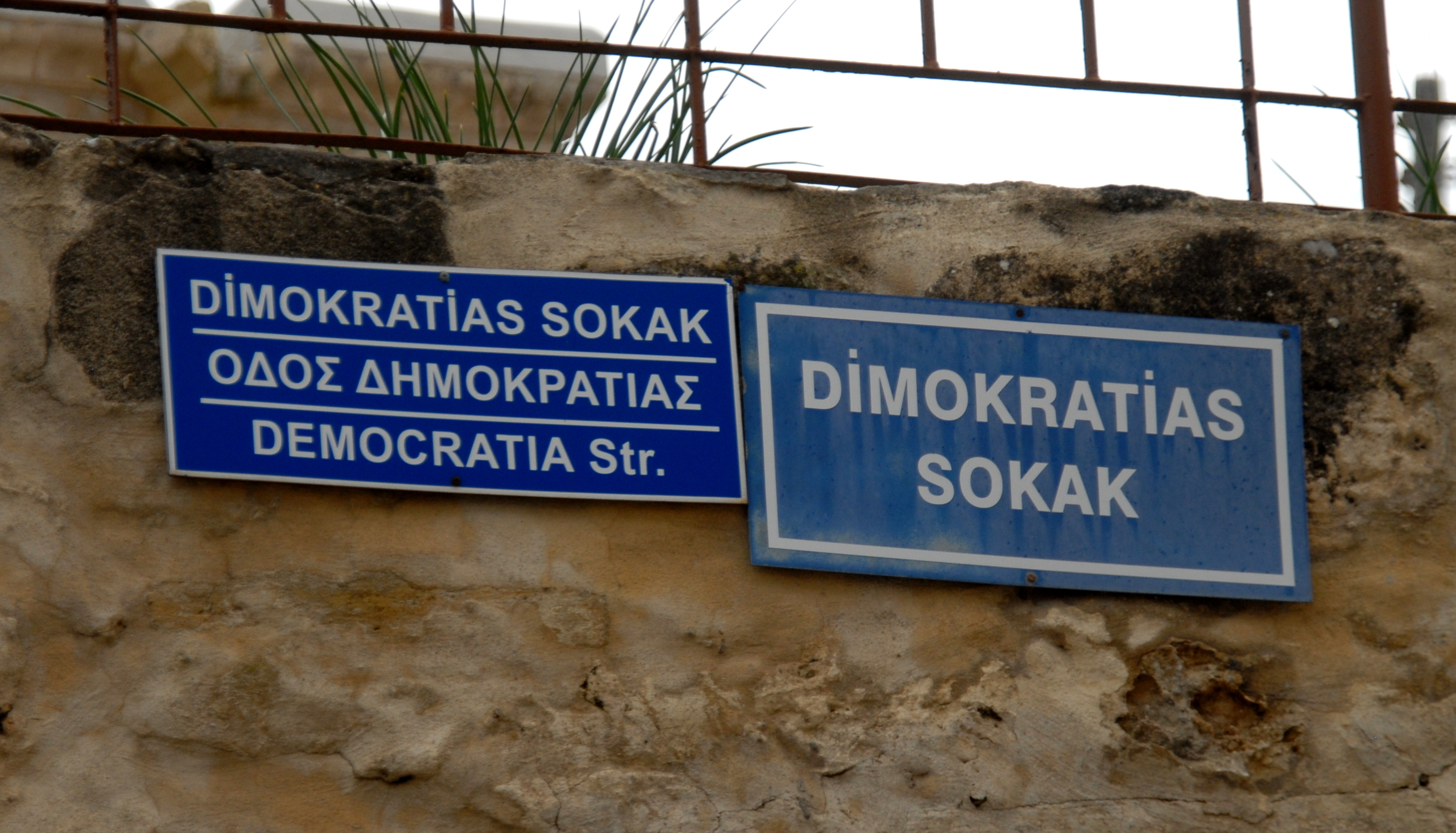
Democratia Street signs in three languages in Kormacit

Street name signs are not legally defined as signs in the KOK. This gives authorities flexibility in their design and placement. They can be fixed to a pole, wall or building. The text is in ARIAL font. In the free parts of the island (at least), the signs are identical to those in Greece (white letters on a blue background.), and the text reads: ΟΔΟΣ XXXXX/YYYYYY STR. (Where XXXXX in Greek and YYYYYY in English).

However, in the Turkish-occupied territories, designs vary. The signs placed near the Green Line have three languages, Greek, English and Turkish, and the text is XXXXX SOKAK/ΟΔΟΣ YYYYY/ZZZZZZ Str. (Where XXXXX in Turkish, YYYYY in Greek and ZZZZZ in English.). In the rest of the occupied parts it is only in Turkish and is black letters on a yellow background.

Likewise, in Akrotiri and Dekelia, the signs are white with black letters.

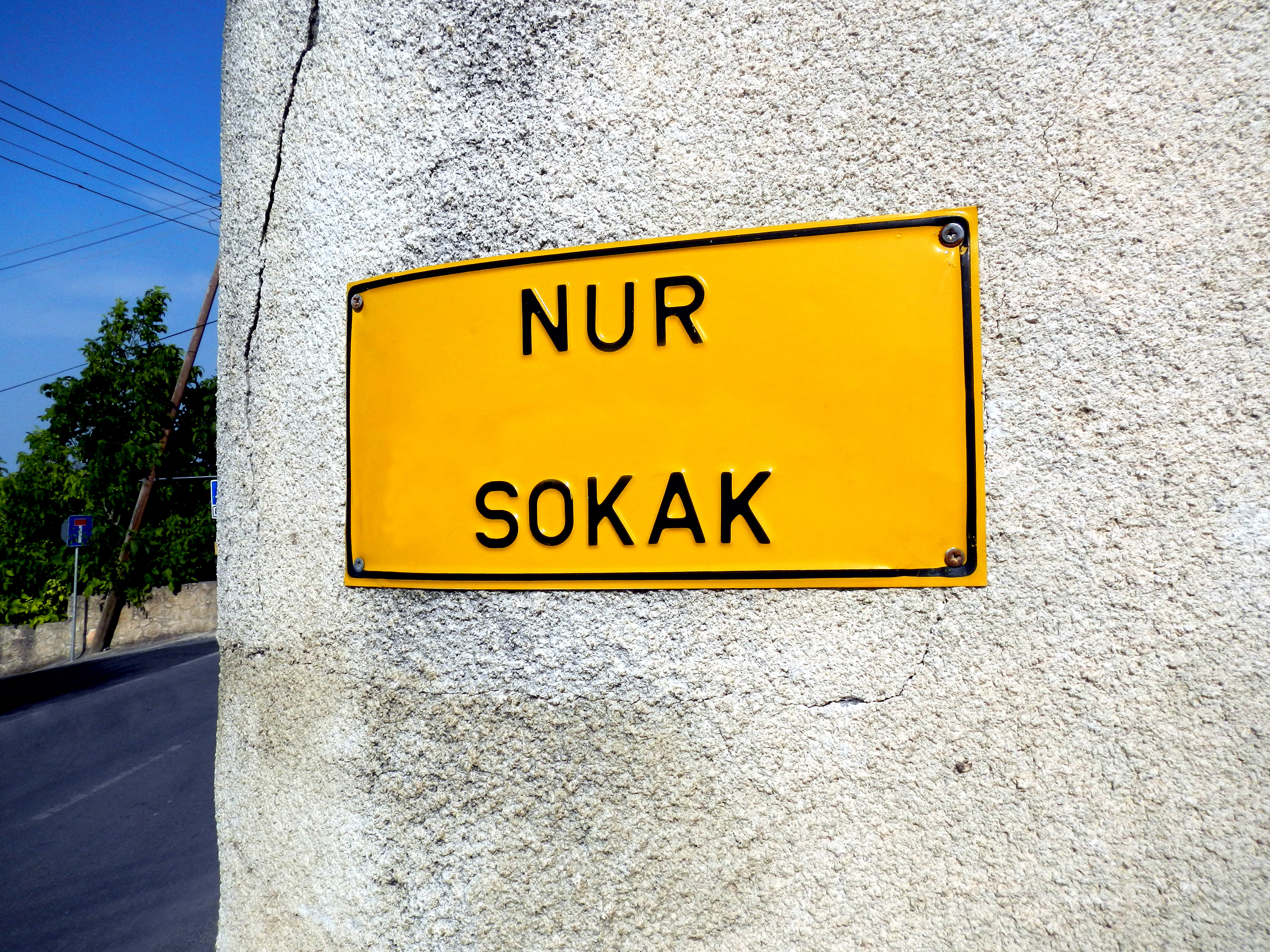
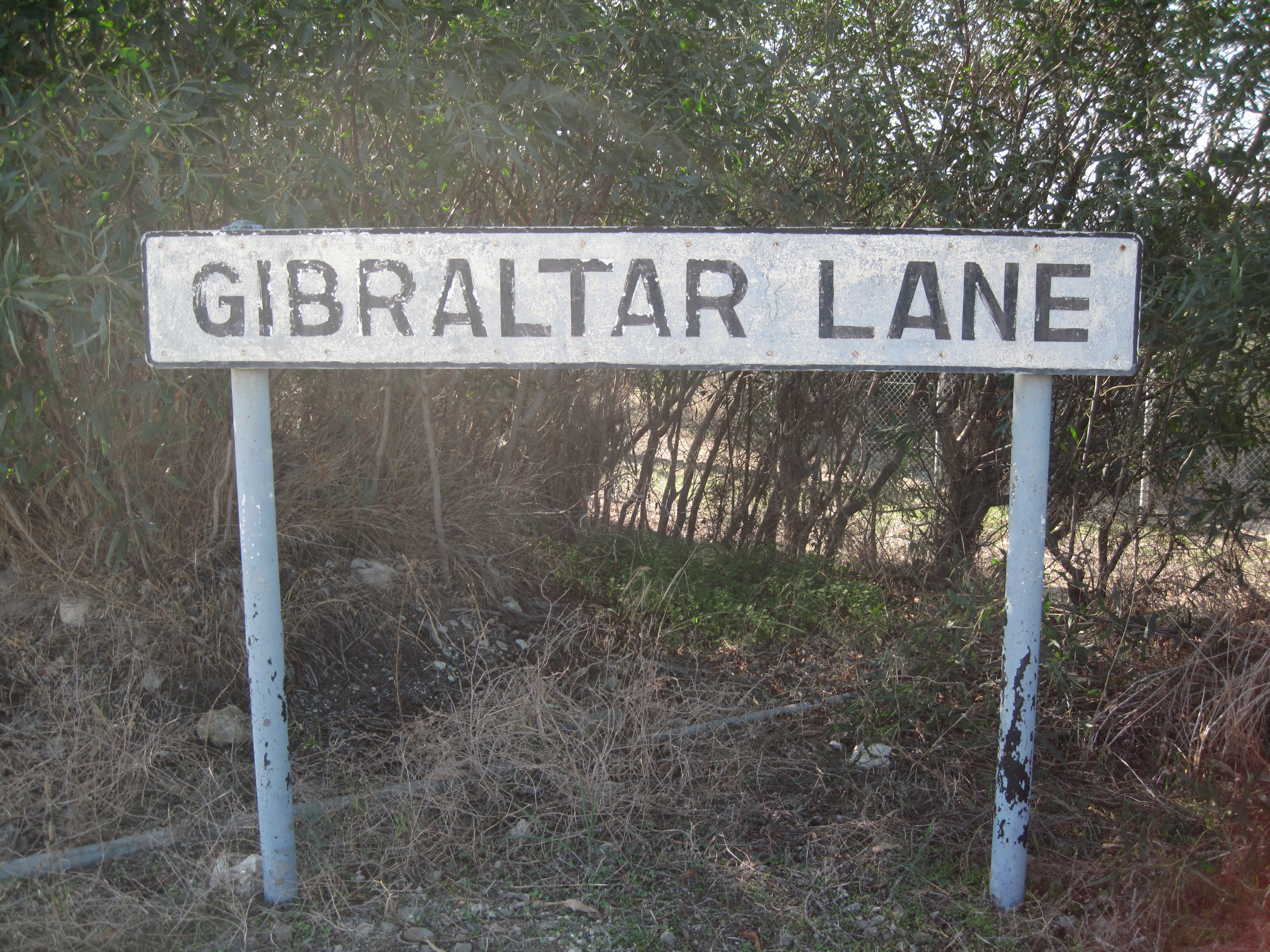
Street name sign in Northern Cyprus (left) and Akrotiri and Dhekelia (right)

=== Other official signs ===
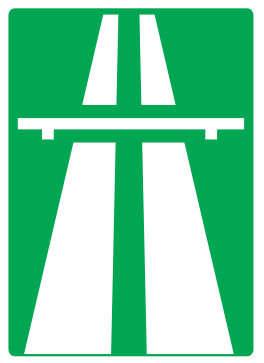
Highway

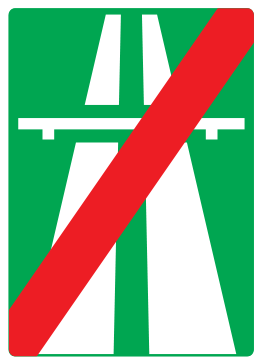
End of highway

Highway exit warning

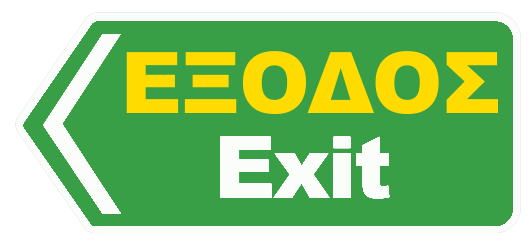
Motorway exit

Cycle lane

Cycle path separated from pedestrian path.

Cycle path separated from pedestrian path. (Alternative)

Road shared by cyclists and pedestrians.

Road shared by bicycles and buses

No bicycles allowed

Road with special measures for cyclists.

Speed camera

=== Road signs in Akrotiri and Dhekelia ===
Although Akrotiri and Dhekelia is a British Overseas Territory and it has British military bases and installations formerly part of the Crown colony of Cyprus, there is no differentiation in terms of signs and they are defined by the same legislation that is defined in most of the island.

=== Northern Cyprus ===
Road signs leaving the village of Kalkanlı

In the Turkish Republic of Northern Cyprus, a de facto state formed after the Turkish invasion of Cyprus in 1974 and that declared its independence from the Republic of Cyprus in 1983, road signs have the same design features as those used in Turkey. Typical differences from signs used in the Republic of Cyprus are:

- DUR instead of STOP on stop sign, although in some cases STOP appears together with DUR or just STOP, despite the rule;
- Red crescent instead of red cross on first aid signs and text in Turkish.
Turkish stop sign

Give way

"Turkish Republic of Northern Cyprus" — TRNC sign, where it is placed at the "border" customs with the free piece

"Welcome to the Turkish Republic of Northern Cyprus" — TRNC sign, where it is placed at the "border" customs with the free piece

Mandatory roundabout

Roundabout sign leading to Nicosia, Larnaca, Athienou and the Turkish-occupied areas.

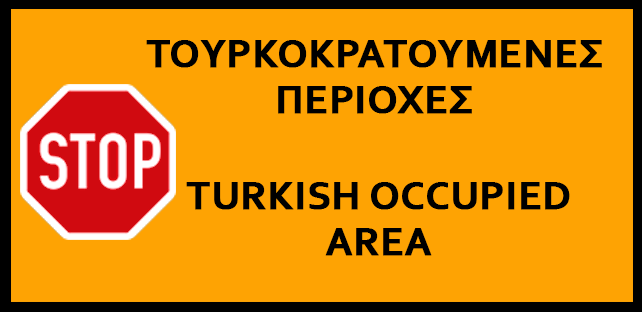
"Stop — Turkish occupied area". Sign of the Republic of Cyprus, where it is placed on the green cease-fire line.

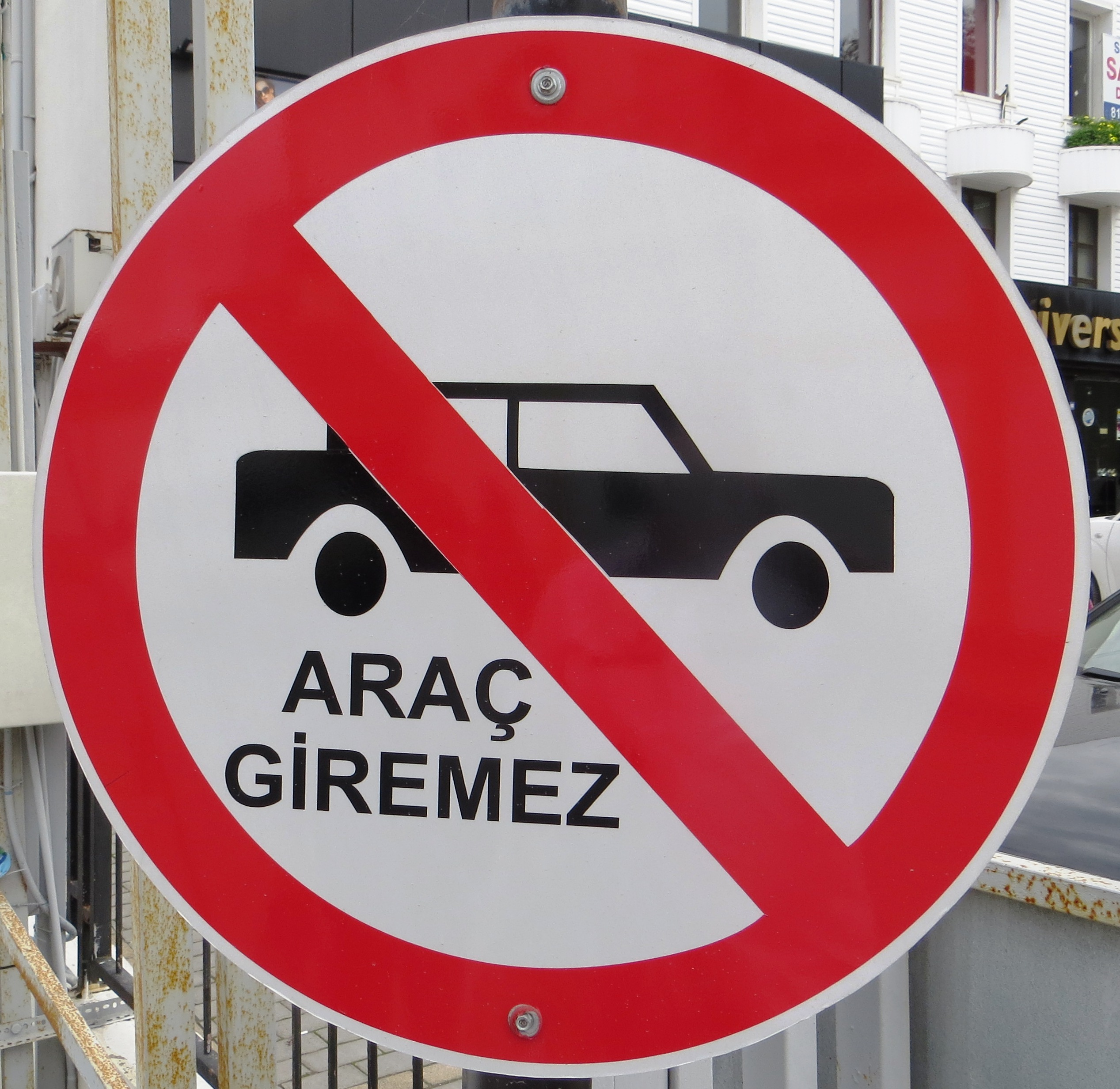
Turkish language car ban sign. The Turkish text means "Vehicles may not enter"

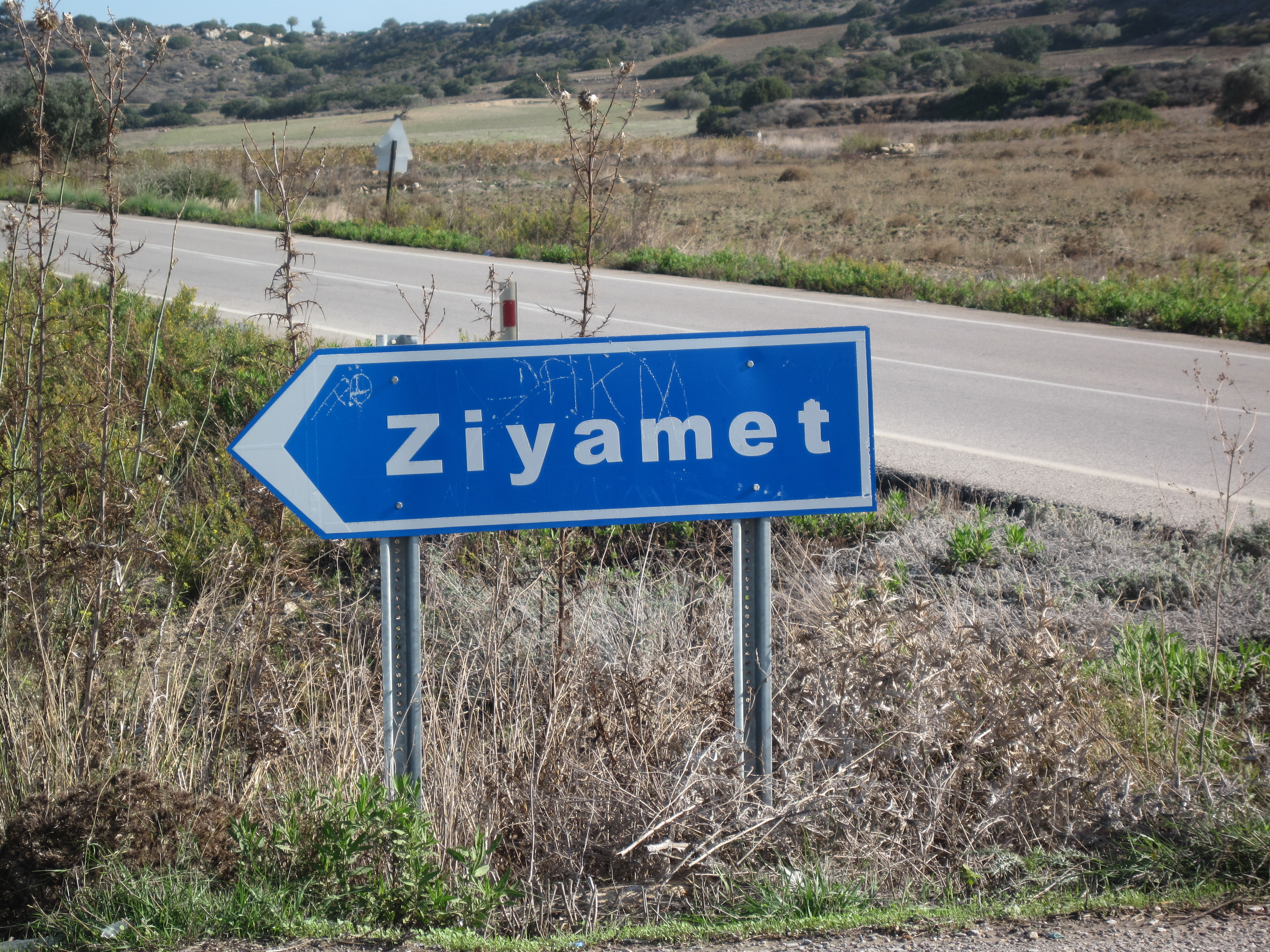
Turkish direction sign for Leonarisso (Ziyamet)
