= Road signs in Armenia =

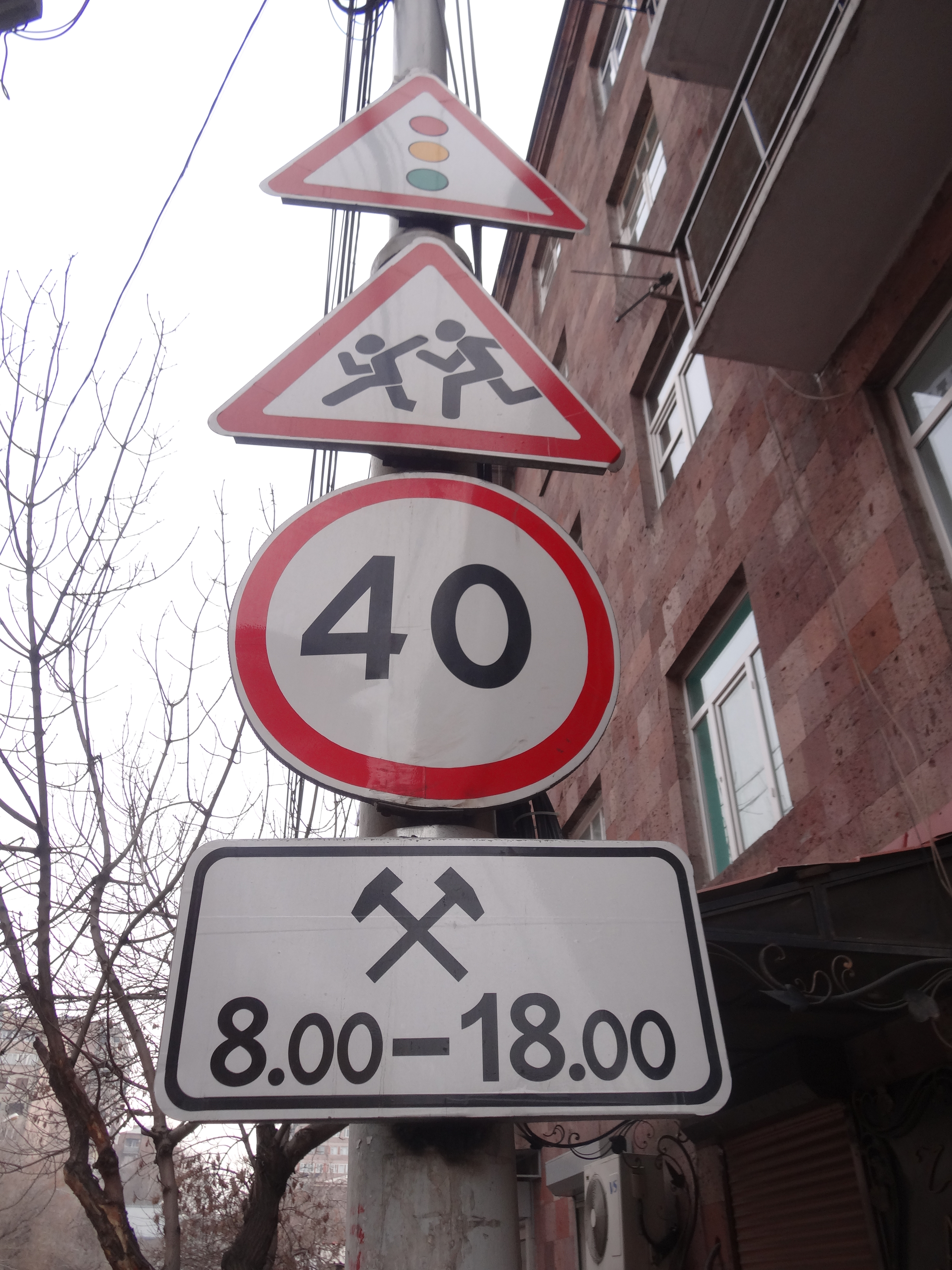
Road signs in Yerevan

Road signs in Armenia are similar to the signs of other post-Soviet states and most European road sign systems. Armenia is a signatory of the Vienna Convention on Road Traffic and the Vienna Convention on Road Signs and Signals. The Ministry of Transport regulates these icons, while the police enforces them.

The rules for the use of road signs and their technical requirements are governed by the Russian standards GOST R 52289-2019 and GOST R 52290-2004 as well as the interstate standard GOST 32945-2014. Road signs are written in Armenian and English.

== Gallery ==
=== Warning signs ===
Dangerous curve to the right

Dangerous curve to the left

Dangerous curve, first to the right

Dangerous curve, first to the left

Steep hill downwards

Steep hill upwards

Road narrows on both sides

Road narrow on the right

Road narrows on the left

Opening or swing bridge

Quayside or ferry berth

Uneven road

Speed bumps

Dangerous shoulder

Slippery road

Loose chippings

Falling rocks

Pedestrian crossing ahead

Children

Cyclists

Animals (cattle)

Animals (deer)

Roadworks ahead

Traffic signals

Crossroads without priority

Roundabout

Two-way traffic

Traffic queues likely

Level crossing ahead with barriers

Level crossing ahead without barriers

Level crossing (single track)

Level crossing (multiple tracks)

Tramway

Level crossing countdown

Level crossing countdown

Level crossing countdown

Level crossing countdown

Level crossing countdown

Level crossing countdown

Airport

Side winds

Other dangers (plate must be used to indicate the danger)

=== Priority signs ===
Priority road

End of priority road

Crossroads with priority

Side road with priority, from the right

Side road with priority, from the left

Oblique side road with priority, from the right

Oblique side road with priority, from the left

Merging traffic, from the right

Merging traffic, from the left

Give way

Stop

Give way to oncoming traffic

Priority over oncoming traffic

=== Prohibitory signs ===
Do not enter

Closed to all vehicles

No entry for motor vehicles

No entry for trucks

No entry for motorcycles

No entry for agricultural vehicles

No entry for trailers

No entry for animal-drawn vehicles

No entry for cyclist

No entry for pedestrians

Weight limit

Axle weight limit

Height limit

Width limit

Length limit

Maximum separation

Passing without stopping prohibited

No right turn

No left turn

No U-turn

No overtaking

End of overtaking prohibited

No overtaking by good vehicles

End of overtaking prohibition by trucks

Maximum speed limit (10 km/h)

Maximum speed limit (20 km/h)

Maximum speed limit (30 km/h)

Maximum speed limit (40 km/h)

Maximum speed limit (50 km/h)

Maximum speed limit (60 km/h)

Maximum speed limit (70 km/h)

Maximum speed limit (80 km/h)

Maximum speed limit (90 km/h)

Maximum speed limit (100 km/h)

Maximum speed limit (110 km/h)

End of speed limit (50 km/h)

No audible warning devices

No stopping or standing

No parking or waiting

Alternate parking on odd days

Alternate parking on even days

End of all prohibitions

No entry for vehicles carrying dangerous goods

No entry for vehicles carrying explosive substances

=== Mandatory signs ===
Proceed straight

Turn right

Turn left

Straight ahead or right turn permitted

Straight ahead or left turn permitted

Keep right

Keep left

Roundabout

Bike path

Pedestrian path

Minimum speed limit

End of minimum speed limit

Proceed straight for vehicles carrying dangerous goods

Turn right for vehicles carrying dangerous goods

Turn left for vehicles carrying dangerous goods

=== Special regulation signs ===
Freeway

End of freeway

Controlled access road

End of controlled access road

One-way street

End of one-way street

One-way street (right)

One-way street (left)

Added lane

Added lane

Added lane

Maximum speed limits per lane

Bus stop

Tram stop

Pedestrian crossing

Pedestrian crossing

Speed bumps

Living zone

End of living zone

Start of city limit

End of city limit

Start of city limit

End of city limit

Parking zone

=== Information signs ===
General speed limits

Advisory speed

Parking

Escape lane

Pedestrian subway

Footbridge

No through road

No through road on right

No through road on left

Traffic scheme

=== Service signs ===
First aid post

Hospital

Filling station

Breakdown service

Public telephone

Restaurant

Hotel

Camping site

Picnic site

Traffic police

=== Additional panels ===
Distance

Stop ahead

Side extension (of no stopping or no parking)

Side extension (of no stopping or no parking)

Distance

Beginning (of no stopping or no parking)

Continuation (of no stopping or no parking)

Ending (of no stopping or no parking)

Direction of priority road

Disabled parking

== See also ==
- Comparison of European road signs
- Comparison of traffic signs in post-Soviet states
- Roads in Armenia
- Transport in Armenia
