= Road signs in Bulgaria =

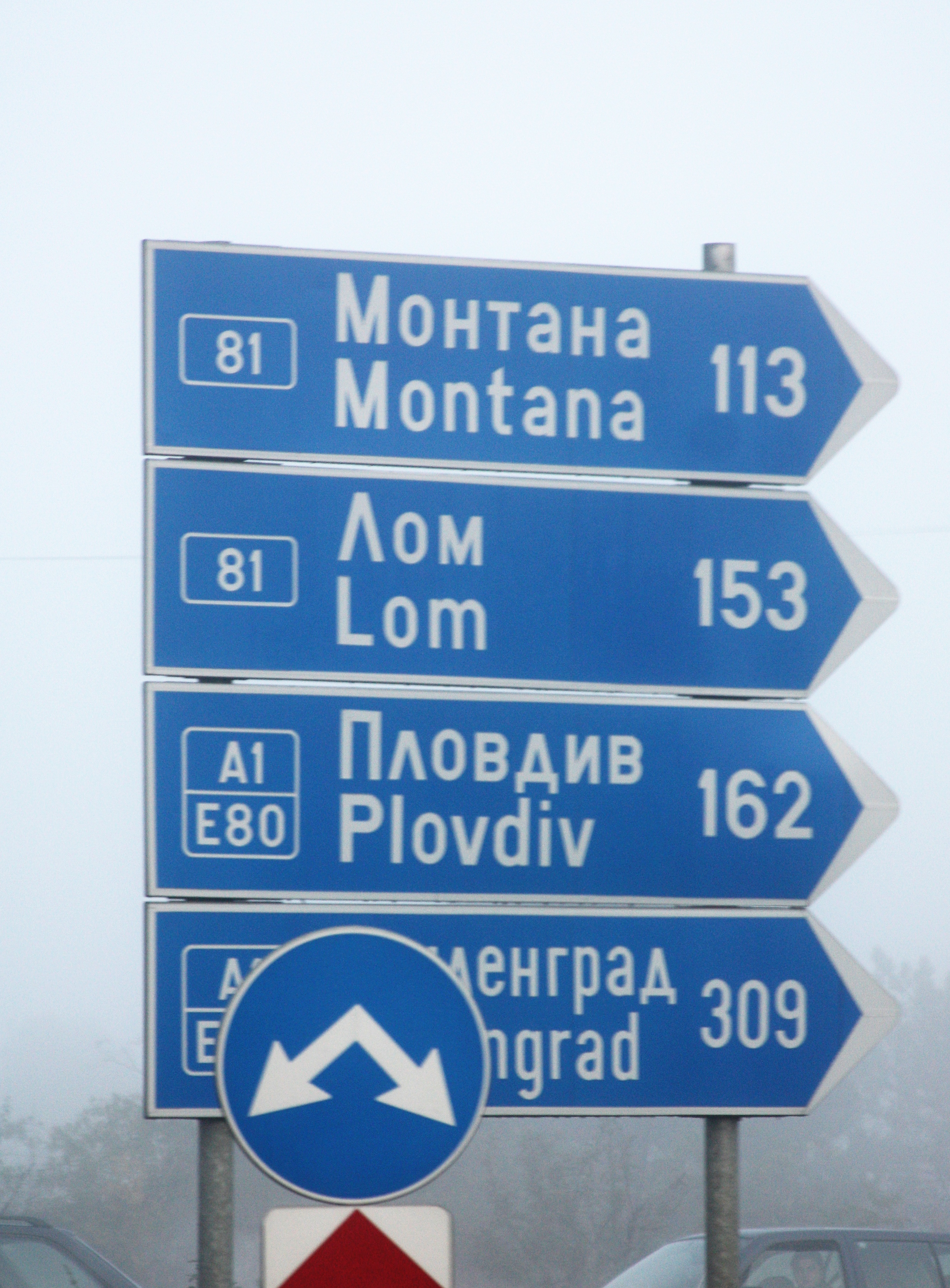
Directional signs in the capital of Sofia.

Road signs in Bulgaria were introduced by the Road Traffic Act and are regulated by:

- Regulations for the implementation of the Road Traffic Act, adopted by a Decree of the Council of Ministers;
- Ordinance No. RD-02-21-1 from 23 November 2023 г. on road signaling with traffic signs, issued by the Minister of Regional Development and Public Works.

Both normative documents are harmonized with the Vienna Convention on Road Signs and Signals (1968), which was ratified by Bulgaria on December 28, 1978 (This Convention was not published in the State Gazette). Bulgaria made two declarations upon signature, one reservation upon ratification and one declaration upon ratification. One reservation made upon ratification is regarding transliteration into Latin characters solely to indicate the terminal points of international routes passing through Bulgaria and places of interest to international tourism. This is because the Cyrillic script is used in the writing system of the Bulgarian language, the official language of Bulgaria.

Road signs in Bulgaria use the SNV typeface, which is also used in neighboring countries in the Balkans, such as Romania, Serbia, and North Macedonia. Inscriptions on road signs are usually written in both Bulgarian and English (Cyrillic and Latin scripts respectively), including settlement names.

Today, there are some differences between the two documents regarding road signs. The latest changes in Ordinance No. 18 were promulgated in the State Gazette No. 13, dated February 14, 2020. These changes are not reflected in the Regulations for the Implementation of the Road Traffic Act.

== Warning signs ==
А1
Right curve

А2
Left curve

А3
Double curve, first at right

А4
Double curve, first at left

А5
Steep downhill

А6
Steep uphill

А7
Road narrows — two-sided

А8
Road narrows - on the right

А9
Road narrows - on the left

А10
Opening bridge

А11
Unprotected quayside or riverbank

А12
Uneven road

А13
Speed bump

А14
Dangerous roadside

А15
Slippery road

А16
Loose chippings

А17
Falling rocks

А18
Pedestrian crossing

А19
Children area

А20
Cyclists

А21
Cattle

А22
Deer

А23
Roadworks

А24
Traffic lights

А25
Crossroads without priority (give way to the vehicles coming from the right)

А26
Intersection with a secondary road

А27
Secondary road junction on the right

А28
Secondary road junction on the left

А29
Roundabout ahead

А30
Two - way traffic

А31
Trams

А32
Level crossing with barriers ahead

А33
Level crossing without barriers ahead

А34.1
Single track level crossing

А34.2
Multitrack level crossing

А35.1
Distance to the road-railway crossing

А35.2
Distance to the road-railway crossing

А35.3
Distance to the road-railway crossing

А35.4
Distance to the road-railway crossing

А35.5
Distance to the road-railway crossing

А35.6
Distance to the road-railway crossing

А36
Low-flying aircraft

А37
Crosswinds

А38
Tunnel

А39
Other dangers

А40
Accident-prone road area

А41
Traffic jam

А42
Fog

А43
A traffic accident has occurred

== Priority signs ==
Б1
Give way

Б2
Stop

Б3
Priority road

Б4
End of priority road

Б5
Give way to vehicles coming from the opposite direction

Б6
Priority over vehicles in opposite direction

== Prohibitory signs ==
В1
No entry

В2
Road closed to all traffic

В3
No motor vehicles

В4
No trucks/heavy goods vehicles

В5
No trucks/heavy goods vehicles pulling trailers

В6
No trailers

В7
No tractors

В8
No motorcycles

В9
No bicycles

В10
No horse-drawn vehicles

В11
No handcarts

В12
No pedestrians

В13
No vehicles carrying dangerous goods

В14
No trucks and motorbikes

В15
Width limit (2.5 metres)

В16
Height limit (3.5 metres)

В17
Length limit (12 metres)

В18
Weight limit (9.5 tonnes)

В19
Weight limit per axle

В20
No traffic allowed without indicated minimum distance between vehicles

В21
No right turn

В22
No left turn

В23
No U-turn

В24
No overtaking

В25
No overtaking by trucks/heavy goods vehicles

В26
Speed limit (50 km/h)

В26
Speed limit (60 km/h)

В26
Speed limit (80 km/h)

В27
Do not block

В28
No parking

В29
Stop for customs

В30
No sound signals

В31
End of no overtaking zone

В32
End of no overtaking by trucks/heavy goods vehicles zone

В33
End of speed limit (50 km/h)

В34
End of all restrictions

== Mandatory signs ==
Г1
Keep straight

Г2
Turn right ahead

Г3
Turn left ahead

Г4
Turn right or go straight ahead

Г5
Turn left or go straight ahead

Г6
Turn left or right ahead

Г7
Turn right before the sign

Г8
Turn left before the sign

Г9
Keep right

Г10
Keep left

Г11
Keep left or right

Г12
Roundabout

Г13
Exclusive bus or trolleybus lane

Г14а
Bicycle lane

Г14б
End of bicycle lane

Г15а
Pedestrian lane

Г15б
End of pedestrian lane

Г16а
Segregated pedestrian and bicycle path

Г16б
End of segregated pedestrian and bicycle path

Г17
Minimum speed limit (30 km/h)

Г17
Minimum speed limit (50 km/h)

Г18
End of minimum speed limit (30 km/h)

Г18
End of minimum speed limit (50 km/h)

Г19
Snow chains compulsory

Г20
Vehicles carrying hazardous goods should turn right

== Special regulations signs ==
Д1
Number of lanes and traffic directions

Д1
Number of lanes and traffic directions

Д1
Number of lanes and traffic directions

Д2
Additional road lane for slow-moving road vehicles

Д2
Additional road lane for slow-moving road vehicles

Д2
Additional road lane for slow-moving road vehicles

Д3
Pre-rebuild directory

Д3
Pre-rebuild directory

Д4
One-way traffic

Д5
Motorway

Д6
End of motorway

Д7
Limited-access highway

Д7
Limited-access highway

Д8
End of limited-access highway

Д8
End of limited-access highway

Д9
Entrance to tunnel

Д9
Entrance to tunnel

Д10
End of tunnel

Д10
End of tunnel

Д11
Entrance to built-up area

Д12
End of built-up area

Д13
No parking zone

Д14 End of the zone of the inserted sign

Д15
Entrance to residential area zone

Д16
End of residential area zone

Д17
Pedestrian zone

Д18
Hospital

Д19
Parking

Д20
Paid parking

Д21
Disabled people parking

Д22
Tram stop

Д23
Trolleybus stop

Д24
Bus stop

Д25
Vignette road

Д25
Vignette and toll road

Д25
Toll road

Д26
Parking space for electric vehicles for charging

== Indication signs ==
Е1
Medical center

Е2
A hospital with an emergency department

Е3
Police

Е4
Telephone

E5 Technical service station

E6
Car wash

Е7
Gas station

E8
Tourist information point

E9
Hotel or motel

E10
Restaurant

E11
Café

E12
Camping site

E13
Caravan site

E14
Camping and caravan site

E15
Youth hostel

E16
Picnic site

E17
Starting point for walks

E18
Drinking water

Е19
Toilet

Е20
Taxi stand

Е21
Pedestrian underpass

Е22
National speed limits (used at border crossings with other countries)

Е23
The passage is open or closed to traffic

Е23
The passage is open or closed to traffic

Е23
The passage is open or closed to traffic

Е24
Control with automated technical means or systems

Е25
Charging station for electric vehicles

Е26
Hydrogen charging station

== Information signs ==
Ж1
Preliminary route guide sign

Ж1
Preliminary route guide sign

Ж1
Preliminary route guide sign

Ж1
Preliminary route guide sign

Ж2
Route guide sign with destinations used on highways

Ж2
Route guide sign with destinations used on roads

Ж2
Route guide sign with destinations used inside cities

Ж3
Advance traffic diversion sign

Ж4
Alternative way of driving in connection with the prohibition on turning left

Ж5
Truck route

Ж6
Signboard

Ж7
Pointing arrow

Ж7
Pointing arrow

Ж7
Pointing arrow

Ж8
Directions to ferry

Ж9
U-turn permitted

Ж10
Destinations sign with distances used on highways

Ж10
Destinations sign with distances used on roads

Ж11
Object name (river)

Ж12
Entry to no through road

Ж13
Dead end

Ж14
Start of lane

Ж14
Start of lane

Ж14
Start of lane

Ж15
End of lane

Ж15
End of lane

Ж15
End of lane

Ж16
Crossing into the oncoming traffic lane

Ж18
Emergency escape lane for runaway vehicles

Ж19
50 km/h advisory speed

Ж20/Ж21
Highway route number sign

Ж20
Motorway number according to the national classification

Ж20
National classification road number

Ж21
Road number according to the international classification

Ж22
Kilometer sign

== Additional plates ==
Т1
Above sign effective in 1300 metres

Т2
Sign area effective

Т3
Start

Т4
Continue

Т5
End

Т6
Road vehicle to which the action of the road sign applies

Т7
A road vehicle to which the effect of the traffic sign does not apply

Т8
Stop ahead in 50 metres (placed below the give way sign to warn of a stop sign ahead)

Т9
Arrow

Т10
Validity time of the traffic sign

Т11
A pointer to an object

Т12
Way of parking the road vehicles

Т13
Diagram of priority road direction

T14.1
Road conditions (ice)

T14.2
Road conditions (rainfall)

T15
Working days

T16
Saturdays, Sundays and holidays

T17
Text plate

T18.1
Plate indicating that unattended vehicle will be towed-away at the expense of the vehicle owner

T18.2
Placement of restrictive measures

== Unofficial road signs ==
EU country border

== Historic signs ==
Е7.3
Gas station that also offers unleaded gasoline

Ж17
Medium lane for overtaking in the indicated direction

=== 1953 road signs ===
Crossroad

Level crossing

Series of bends

Danger

Do not enter

No vehicles

No motor vehicles with more than three wheels

No trucks

No motorcycle

No horse-drawn carts

No cycling

No parking

No stopping

No overtaking

Speed limit

Weight limit

Height limit

No beeping

No motor vehicles

Customs

Mandatory direction

Caution recommended

Parking

=== 1960 road signs ===
==== Warning signs ====
Yield

Crossroad with priority

Crossroad

Right curve

Left curve

Double right curve

Double left curve

Steep descent

Road narrows

Slippery surface

Uneven road

Roadworks

Children

Pedestrian crossing

Wild animals

Domesticated animals

Other danger

Level crossing with gates

Level crossing without gates

Countdown marker

Countdown marker

Countdown marker

Countdown marker

==== Prohibitory signs ====
No entry

No vehicles

No motor vehicles except motorcycles

No motor vehicles

No trucks

No motorcycles

No bicycles

No horse carts

No right turn

No left turn

No overtaking

Speed limit

Yield to oncoming traffic

Stop

Weight limit

Axle load limit

Width limit

Height limit

No beeping

No stopping

No parking

Customs

End of speed limit

==== Mandatory signs ====
Turn left

Turn right

Go straight

Go straight or left

Go straight or right

Keep right

Keep left

Roundabout

Bicycle path

Footpath

Bridle path

==== Informtion signs ====
Priority over oncoming traffic

U-turn permitted

Parking

Hospital

First aid or hospital

Telephone

Filling station

Repair service

Camping

Priority road

End of priority road
