= Road signs in Turkey =

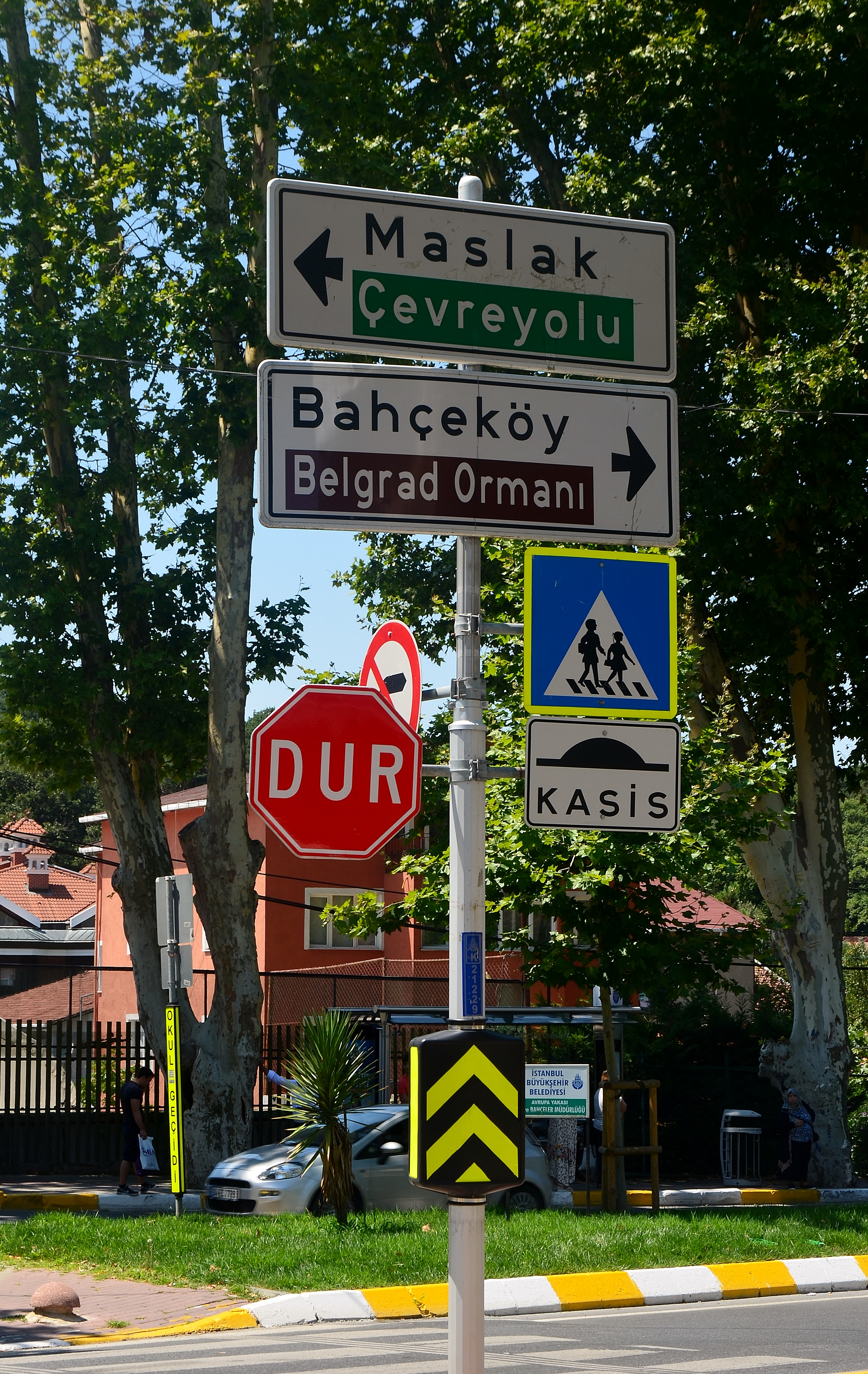
Various road signs located in Istanbul

Road signs in Turkey conform to the general pattern of those used in most other European countries and to those set out in the Vienna Convention on Road Signs and Signals. They are regulated in the Karayolu Trafik İşaretleme Standartları (Road Traffic Signage Standards).

On May 17, 2023, Turkey acceded to the Vienna Convention on Road Signs and Signals.

== Warning signs ==
Curve to the right

Curve to the left

Double curve, first to the right

Double curve, first to the left

Steep descent

Steep ascent

Road narrows on both sides

Road narrows on the right side

Road narrows on the left side

Drawbridge

Quayside or river bank

Uneven road surface

Slippery road

Loose gravel

Falling or fallen rocks

Pedestrian crossing

Children crossing

Cyclists crossing

Be careful of cattle

Be careful of deer

Roadworks

Traffic light ahead

Low-flying aircraft

Crosswinds

Two-way traffic ahead

Warning

Crossroads (with right-of-way road)

Crossroads (with priority)

Side road to the right

Side road to the left

Merging traffic on the right

Merging traffic on the left

Roundabout ahead

Railroad crossing with barrier

Railroad crossing without barrier

Single track Railroad crossing

Double track Railroad crossing

Three-striped marker (300m)

Two-striped marker (200m)

One-striped marker (100m)

Curve marker

Curve marker

Clearance signs (roadworks)

Clearance signs

Traffic island

Bridge signs

Obstacle

Soft verges

Ice or snow

Traffic queues likely

Tram crossing

== Regulatory signs ==
=== Prohibitory signs ===
Give way

Stop

Give way to oncoming vehicles

No entry

No vehicles

No motor vehicles except motorcycles

No motorcycles

No cyclists

No mopeds

No trucks

No buses

No trailers

No pedestrians

No animal-drawn vehicles

No handcarts

No tractors

No vehicles carrying explosive substances

No vehicles carrying dangerous goods

No vehicles carrying water pollutant substances

No motor vehicles

No motor vehicles or animal-drawn vehicles

Width limit

Height limit

Length limit

Axle weight limit

Weight limit

Minimum safe distance (MSF)

No right turn

No left turn

No U-turn

No overtaking

No overtaking for heavy vehicles

Maximum speed limit

No audible warning devices

Stop for customs (Douane)

End of all prohibitions

End of speed limit

End of overtaking prohibition

End of overtaking prohibition by goods vehicles

=== Mandatory signs ===
Turn right

Turn left

Proceed straight

Proceed straight or turn right

Proceed straight or turn left

Proceed left or right

Turn right ahead

Turn left ahead

Keep right

Keep left

Pass either side

Roundabout

Cycle path

Pedestrian path

Horse path

Minimum speed limit

End of minimum speed limit

Use snow chains

Turn left for vehicles carrying dangerous goods

Proceed straight for vehicles carrying dangerous goods

Turn right for vehicles carrying dangerous goods

== Information signs ==
Dead end (on a road to the right)

Dead end (on a road to the right)

Indirect left turn

Lane usage

General speed limits

Pedestrian crossing

Children crossing

Pedestrian zone (No vehicles)

Pedestrian zone (No motor vehicles)

One-way traffic

One-way traffic (forward)

No through road

Start of Otoyol

End of Otoyol

Start of motor-vehicles-only road

End of motor-vehicles-only road

Bus stop

First aid

Repair shop

Telephone

Gas station

Hotel

Restaurant

Fountain or faucet

Picnic site

Hiking path

Camping site

Caravan site

Camping and caravan site

Youth hostel

Priority over oncoming traffic

Priority road

End of priority road

Traffic radio information

Pedestrian underpass

Swimming pool

Tunnel

Underwater tunnel

Escape lane

== Parking signs ==
No parking

No stopping (and parking)

Parking

Parking garage

Park halfway on the sidewalk

Park on the sidewalk

Park and ride (Tram)

Parking and ride (Metro station)

Park halfway on the sidewalk (horizontal view)

Parking on the sidewalk (horizontal view)

== Additional signs ==
Length

Distance

Side extension (of no-parking and no-stopping signs)

Stop ahead

Disabled parking

Ice or snow

Beginning (of no-parking and no-stopping signs)

Ending (of no-parking and no-stopping signs)

Continuation (of no-parking and no-stopping signs)

Direction of main road

Direction of main road

== Historic signs ==
=== 1952 road signs ===
Right curve

Left curve

Sharp right curve

Sharp left curve

Double right curve

Double left curve

Double sharp right curve

Double sharp left curve

Right hairpin curve

Left hairpin curve

Crossroads

Stop ahead

Side road on right

Side road on left

T-intersection

Side road at acute angle on right

Side road at acute angle on left

Y-intersection

Railroad crossing without gates

Railroad crossing with gates

Rough road

Road narrows

Narrow bridge

Steep grade

Roadworks

Pedestrian crossing

School

Narrow passage

Low clearance

Dangerous bends

Slow

Stop

No entry

No left turn

No U-turn

Maximum weight

Speed limit

No stopping

No parking

No parking at specified time

Time-restricted parking

== See also ==
- Comparison of European road signs
