= Road signs in Azerbaijan =

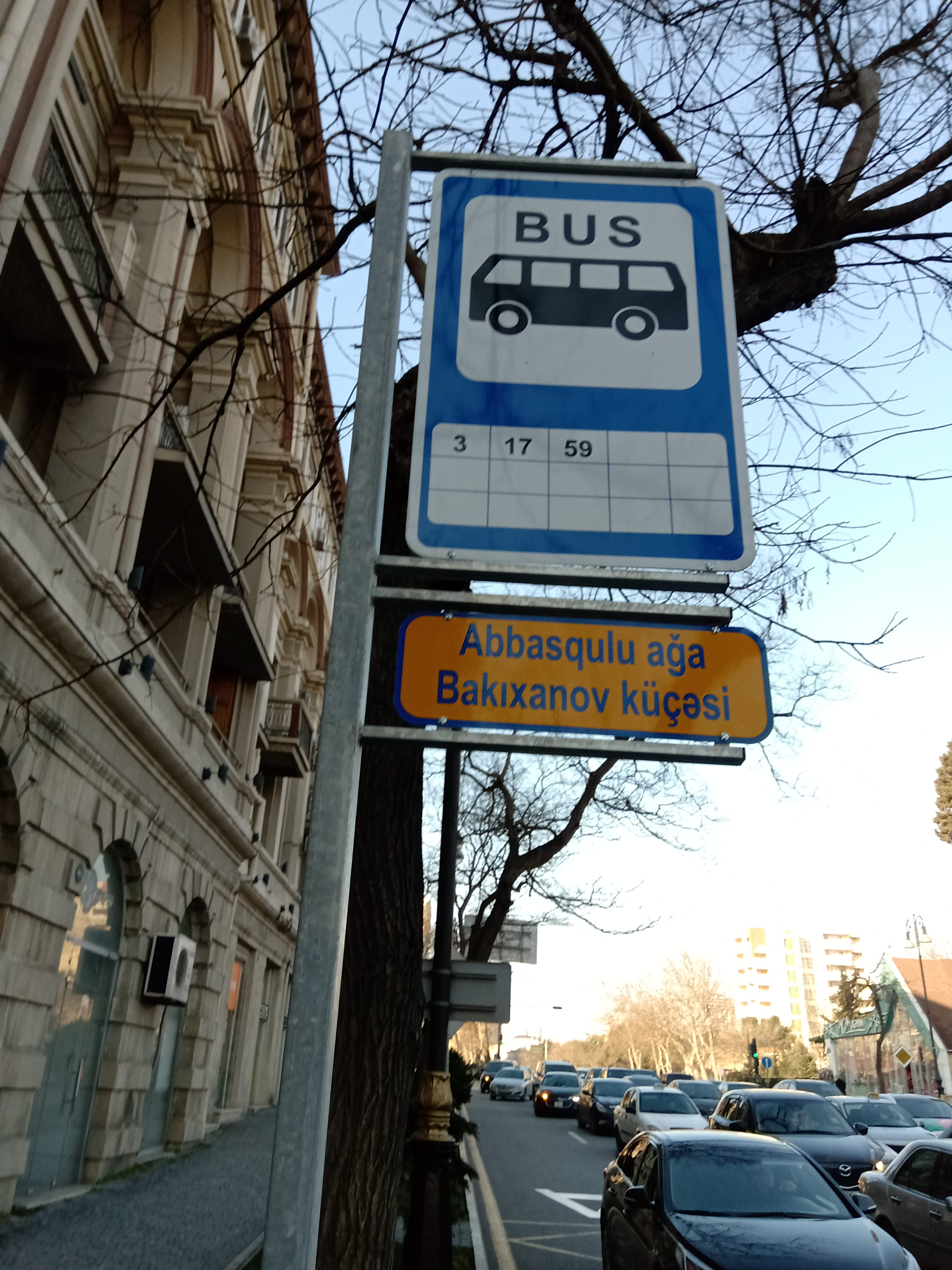
Road signs in Bakikhanov

Road signs in Azerbaijan are similar to the road sign system of post-Soviet states (as well as neighboring Armenia, Georgia and Russia) that ensure that transport vehicles move safely and orderly, as well as to inform the participants of traffic built-in graphic icons. They generally conform to the Vienna Convention on Road Traffic and Vienna Convention on Road Signs and Signals.

Since Azerbaijan was a union republic of the Soviet Union before regaining its independence in 1991, road signs in Azerbaijan are largely based on the GOST 10807-78 and GOST 23457-86 Soviet standards but with additions. Inscriptions on road signs are in Azerbaijani language (names of settlements can also be written in English) and in Latin script only.

In the Republic of Artsakh, a former breakway state formed during the First Nagorno-Karabakh War in 1991 and de-facto dissolved in September 2023, road signs with settlement names in Armenian, Russian and English were used. In September 2023 after the Azerbaijani offensive in Nagorno-Karabakh, Armenian-language road signs began to be removed.

== Gallery ==
=== Warning signs ===
1.1. Level crossing ahead with barriers or gates

1.2. Level crossing ahead without barriers or gates

1.3.1. Single track level crossing

1.3.2. Multiple track level crossing

1.4.1. Approaching a railway crossing

1.4.2. Approaching a railway crossing

1.4.3. Approaching a railway crossing

1.4.4. Approaching a railway crossing

1.4.5. Approaching a railway crossing

1.4.6. Approaching a railway crossing

1.5. Tramway

1.6.1. Crossroads without priority

1.6.2. Crossroads with equal importance where priority to the right

1.6.3. Side road without priority to the right

1.6.4. Side road without priority to the left

1.6.5. T-junction

1.6.6. Y-junction

1.7. Roundabout warning

1.8. Traffic signals

1.9. Drawbridge

1.10. Unprotected quayside or riverbank

1.11.1. Dangerous curve to the right

1.11.2. Dangerous curve to the left

1.12.1. Dangerous curve, first to the right

1.12.2. Dangerous curve, first to the left

1.13. Steep hill downwards

1.14. Steep hill upwards

1.15. Slippery road

1.16.1. Uneven road ahead

1.16.2. Dip

1.16.3. Speed bumps

1.17. Loose stones

1.18.1. Road narrow on both sides

1.18.2. Road narrow on right side

1.18.3. Road narrow on left side

1.19. Two-way traffic

1.20. Pedestrian crossing

1.21. Children

1.22. Cyclists crossing

1.23. Roadworks

1.24. Animals (cow)

1.25. Animals (deer)

1.26. Falling rocks

1.27. Crosswinds

1.28. Low-flying aircraft

1.29. Tunnel

1.30. Other dangers

1.31.1. Hazard chevron

1.31.2. Hazard chevron

1.31.3. Hazard chevron

1.32. Accident

1.33. Traffic jam

=== Priority signs ===
2.1. Priority road

2.2. End of priority road

2.3.1 Crossroads with priority

2.3.2. Side road with priority, from the right

2.3.3. Side road with priority, from the left

2.4. Yield

2.5. Stop

2.6. Yield to oncoming traffic

2.7. Priority over oncoming traffic

=== Prohibitory signs ===
3.1. No entry

3.2. Closed to all vehicles

3.3. No entry for vehicles except motorcycles

3.4. No entry for heavy vehicles

3.5. No entry for motorcycles

3.6. No entry for farm vehicles

3.7. No entry for trailers

3.8. No entry for animal-drawn vehicles

3.9. No entry for cycles

3.10. No entry for pedestrians

3.11. Weight limit

3.12. Axle weight limit

3.13. Height limit

3.14. Width limit

3.15. Length limit

3.16. Maximum separation

3.17.1. Customs Office. Passing without stopping prohibited

3.17.2. Danger

3.18.1. No right turn

3.18.2. No left turn

3.19. No U-turn

3.20. No overtaking

3.21. End of overtaking prohibition

3.22. No overtaking by trucks

3.23. End of overtaking prohibition by trucks

3.24. Maximum speed limit (50 km/h)

3.25. End of speed limit (50 km/h)

3.26. No audible warning devices

3.27. No stopping

3.28. No parking

3.29. Alternate parking on odd days

3.30. Alternate parking on even days

3.31. End of all prohibitions

3.32. Reserved parking

3.33. Speed limits according to vehicle categories

3.34. No entry for vehicles carrying dangerous goods

3.35. No entry for vehicles carrying explosive substances

=== Mandatory signs ===
4.1.1. Proceed straight

4.1.2. Turn right

4.1.3. Turn left

4.1.4. Straight ahead or right turn permitted

4.1.5. Straight ahead or left turn permitted

4.2.1. Keep right

4.2.2. Keep left

4.2.3. Keep right or left

4.3. Roundabout

4.4. Route for motor vehicles

4.5. Cycle path

4.6. Pedestrian path

4.7. Minimum speed limit

4.8. End of minimum speed limit

4.9.1. Proceed left for vehicles carrying dangerous goods

4.9.2. Proceed straight for vehicles carrying dangerous goods

4.9.3. Proceed right for vehicles carrying dangerous goods

=== Information signs ===
5.1. Motorway

5.2. End of motorway

5.3. Controlled access road

5.4. End of controlled access road

5.5. One-way street

5.6. End of one-way street

5.7.1. One-way street

5.7.2. One-way street

5.8.1. Lane directions

5.8.2. Directions of movement along the lane

5.8.2. Directions of movement along the lane

5.8.2. Directions of movement along the lane

5.8.2. Directions of movement along the lane

5.8.2. Directions of movement along the lane

5.8.3. Added lane

5.8.3. Added lane

5.8.4. Added lane

5.8.5. End of the lane

5.8.6. End of the lane

5.8.7. Lane direction

5.8.7. Lane direction

5.8.8. Lane direction

5.9. Bus lane

5.10.1. Road with a contraflow bus lane

5.10.2. Exit to road with a contraflow bus lane

5.10.3. Exit to road with a contraflow bus lane

5.10.4. End of road with a contraflow bus lane

5.11.1. U-turn

5.11.2. U-turn area

5.12. Bus stop

5.13. Tram stop

5.14. Parking place for passenger taxis

5.15. Parking

5.16.1. Pedestrian crossing

5.16.2. Pedestrian crossing

5.17.1. Underground pedestrian crossing

5.17.2. Underground pedestrian crossing

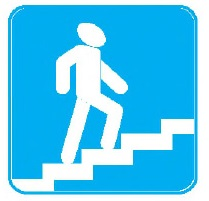
5.17.3. Aboveground pedestrian crossing

5.17.4. Aboveground pedestrian crossing

5.18. Advisory speed

5.19.1. No through road

5.19.2. No through road on right

5.19.3. No through road on left

5.20.1. Preliminary direction indicator

5.20.1. Preliminary direction indicator

5.20.2. Preliminary direction indicator

5.20.3. Traffic scheme

5.21.1. Direction indicator

5.21.1. Direction indicator

5.21.1. Direction indicator

5.21.2. Direction indicator

5.21.2. Direction indicator

5.22. Start of city limit

5.23. End of city limit

5.24. Start of city limit

5.25. End of city limit

5.26. Name of the object

5.27. Distance indicator

5.28. Kilometer sign

5.29.1. Route number

5.29.2. Route number

5.29.2. Route number

5.29.2. Route number

5.30.1. Direction of movement for trucks

5.30.2. Direction of movement for trucks

5.30.3. Direction of movement for trucks

5.31. Detour scheme

5.32.1. Detour direction

5.32.2. Detour direction

5.32.3. Detour direction

5.33. Stop line

5.34.1. Preliminary index of the lane change to another carriageway

5.34.2. Preliminary index of the lane change to another carriageway

5.35. Reversible lane

5.36. End of reversible lane

5.37. Exit to road with reversible lane

5.38. Street direction

5.39. Warning or prohibitory signs at intersections

5.40. No parking zone

5.41. End of no parking zone

5.42. No parking zone at certain time period

5.43. End of no parking zone at certain time period

5.44. Parking zone

5.45. End of parking zone

5.46. Speed limit zone

5.47. End of speed limit zone

5.48.1. Emergency stopping lane (outside the city)

5.48.2. Emergency stopping lane (in city)

5.50.1. Motorway exit countdown

5.50.2. Motorway exit countdown

5.50.3. Motorway exit countdown

5.51. Living zone

5.52. End of living zone

5.53. Permanent right turn

=== Service signs ===
6.1. First aid post

6.2. Hospital

6.3. Filling station

6.4. Breakdown service

6.5. Car washing

6.6. Public telephone

6.7. Restaurant

6.8. Drinking water

6.9. Hotel

6.10. Camping site

6.11. Picnic site

6.12 Traffic police post

6.13 Police

6.14. Information desk

6.15. Toilet

6.16. Swimming pool

6.17. Emergency telephone

6.18. Fire extinguisher

=== Additional panels ===
7.1.1. Distance

7.1.2. Stop ahead

7.1.3. Side extension (right)

7.1.4. Side extension (left)

7.2.1. Coverage area

7.2.2. Coverage area

7.2.3. Coverage area

7.2.4. Coverage area

7.2.5. Coverage area

7.2.6. Coverage area

7.3.1. Directions of action

7.3.2. Directions of action

7.3.3. Directions of action

7.4.1. Type of the vehicle (trucks)

7.4.2. Type of the vehicle (trailers)

7.4.3. Type of the vehicle (trucks)

7.4.4. Type of the vehicle (buses)

7.4.5. Type of the vehicle (tractors)

7.4.6. Type of the vehicle (motorcycles)

7.4.7. Type of the vehicle (bicycles)

7.4.8. Type of the vehicle (e-scooters)

7.5.1. Saturdays, sundays and holidays

7.5.2. Working days

7.5.3. Days of the week

7.5.4. Time period

7.5.5. Time period during saturdays, sundays and holidays

7.5.6. Time period during working days

7.5.7. Time period during days of the week

7.5.9. EV charging station

7.6.1. Method of parking the vehicle

7.6.2. Method of parking the vehicle

7.6.3. Method of parking the vehicle

7.6.4. Method of parking the vehicle

7.6.5. Method of parking the vehicle

7.6.6. Method of parking the vehicle

7.6.7. Method of parking the vehicle

7.6.8. Method of parking the vehicle

7.6.9. Method of parking the vehicle

7.7. Parking with no working engine

7.8. Paid services

7.9. Limitation of parking duration

7.10. Place for car inspection

7.11. Limitation of the permitted maximum mass

7.12. Dangerous roadside

7.13. Direction of the main road

7.14. Traffic lane

7.15. Blind pedestrians

7.16. Wet coating

7.17. Disabled parking

8.18. Except for the disabled

7.19. Turning on low beam
