= Comparison of European traffic laws =

Many countries in Europe have different policies on traffic laws, which are tabulated below. Speed limits on motorways (expressways), dual carriageways (divided streets), single carriageways (undivided streets), and urban areas may differ. Some countries have an upper limit on permitted blood alcohol level (typically maxing out at 0.05%), but other countries do not allow any blood alcohol content at all. Furthermore, rules may also differ whether drivers may be required or recommended to bring seatbelts, warning triangles, first aid, fire extinguishers, spare bulbs, and tow ropes. Countries also vary with respect to minimum driver's age (typically either 17 or 18) and the minimum child age for them to be allowed in the front seat.

== Overview ==
Country code	Country	Speed limit on motorways / controlled-access highways (km/h) or	Speed limit on dual carriageways / limited-access highways (km/h) or	Speed limit on single carriageways outside of urban areas (km/h)	Speed limit in urban areas (km/h)	Permitted alcohol level (%)	Toll roads	Seatbelt required	Minimum child age (front seat)	Triangle required	First aid required	Fire extinguisher required	Spare bulb required	Minimum driver's age	Tow rope required
A	Austria	130	100	100	50	0.05	Yes	All	—N/a	Yes	Yes	Recommended	No	17	Yes
AL	Albania	110	90	80	40	0.01		Yes	—N/a	Recommended	Recommended	Recommended	No	18	Yes
AND	Andorra	—N/a		90	40	0.05		Front	10	Yes	Recommended	Recommended	No	18	Yes
B	Belgium	120	120	70 (Flanders); 90 (Wallonia)	50	0.05	No	All	12	Yes	Yes	Yes	No	18 (17 with supervision of parents)	Yes
BG	Bulgaria	140	120	90	50	0.05	Yes	All	10	Yes	Yes	Yes	Yes	18	Yes
BIH	Bosnia and Herzegovina	130	100	80	50	0.03		Yes	12	Yes	Yes	Recommended	Yes	18	Yes
BY	Belarus	120	90	90	60	0.03	Yes	Yes	12	Yes	Yes	Yes	No	18	Yes
CH	Switzerland	120		80 (100 on limited-access roads)	50	0.05	Yes	All		Yes	Recommended	Recommended	No	18	Yes
CY	Cyprus	100	100	80	50	0.05		All	12	Yes, 2x	Recommended	Recommended	No	18	Yes
CZ	Czech Republic	130	90 (110 on express roads)		50 (80 on express roads and motorways)	0	Yes	All	—N/a	Yes	Yes	Recommended	No	18 (17 for B1 cars)	No
D	Germany	no or speed limit sign (130 recommended)		100	50	0.05	No	All	—N/a	Yes	Yes	Recommended	No	18 (17 with supervision of >30 years old driver)	No
DK	Denmark	130	110	80	50	0.05	Yes	All	—N/a	Use required in case of accident	No	Recommended	No	18	No
E	Spain	120	120	90	30 (roads with one lane in each direction) 50 (roads with at least two lanes in each direction)	0.05	Yes	All	—N/a	Yes, 2x	Recommended	Recommended	No	18	Yes
EST	Estonia	110	100	90	50	0.02		All	—N/a	Yes	Yes	Yes	No	18 (16 with supervision of a person with 2+ years of driving experience)	Yes
F	France	130 (rain/wet 110)	110 (rain/wet 100)	80	50	0.05	Yes	All	10	Yes	Recommended	Recommended	No	17 (15 with supervision of a person with 5+ years of driving experience)	Yes
FIN	Finland	120	100	80–100	50	0.05	No	All	3	Yes	Recommended	Recommended	No	17 (16 with supervision of a 25+ years old person with 5+ years of driving experience)	Yes
FL	Liechtenstein	—N/a	80	80	50	0.08		All	—N/a	Yes	Yes	Recommended	No	18	Yes
GR	Greece	130	90	90	50	0.05		All	12	Yes	Yes	Yes	No	18	Yes
H	Hungary	130	110	90 (110 on express road)	50	0	Yes	All	12	Yes	Yes	Recommended	No	18 (17 with supervision of someone with 10+ years drive-experience)	Yes
HR	Croatia	130	110	80	50	0.05	Yes	All	12	Yes	Yes	Recommended	Yes	18	No
I	Italy	130	110	90	50	0.05	Yes	All	12	Yes	Recommended	Recommended	No	18	Yes
IRL	Ireland	120	100	80 (local & regional roads); 100 (national roads)	50	0.05	Yes	All	—N/a	Recommended	Recommended	Recommended	No	17	Yes
IS	Iceland	—N/a		90 (paved roads); 80 (gravel roads)	50	0.05		All	14	Yes	Recommended	Recommended	No	17	Yes
L	Luxembourg	130		90	50	0.05		All	11	Yes	Recommended	Recommended	No	18	Yes
LT	Lithuania	130 (110 from November 1 to March 31)	120 (110 from November 1 to March 31)	90	50	0.04		All	12	Yes	Yes	Yes	No	18	No
LV	Latvia	—N/a	110	90	50	0.05		All		Yes	Yes	Yes	No	18	Yes
M	Malta	—N/a		80	50	0.08		Yes	11	Recommended	Recommended	Recommended	No	18	Yes
MC	Monaco	—N/a			50	0.05		—N/a	10	Recommended	Recommended	Recommended	No	18	Yes
MD	Moldova	—N/a	110	90	50	0.03		All	12	Yes	Yes	Yes	No	18	Yes
NMK	North Macedonia	130	110	80	50	0.05	Yes	All	12	Yes	Yes	Recommended	Yes	18	Yes
MNE	Montenegro	120		80	50	0.05	Yes	All	12	Yes	Recommended	Recommended	No		Yes
N	Norway	110	90	80	50	0.02	Yes	All	—N/a	Yes	Recommended	Recommended	No	18	Yes
NL	Netherlands	100 (day); 130 (night)	100	80	50	0.05	Yes	All	12	Recommended	Recommended	Recommended	No	18 (17 with supervision of someone with 5+ years drive-experience)	Yes
P	Portugal	120	100	90	50	0.05	Yes	All	12	Yes	Recommended	Recommended	No	18	Yes
PL	Poland	140	100 (120 on express roads)	90 (100 on express roads)	50	0.02	Yes	All	—N/a	Yes	Recommended	Yes	No	18 (16 for B1 cars)	No
RO	Romania	130	90 (100 on European roads and 120 on express roads)	90 (100 on European roads)	50	0	Yes	All	12	Yes	Yes	Yes	No	18 (16 for B1 cars)	No
RSM	San Marino	—N/a		70	50	0.08		All	12	Recommended	Recommended	Recommended	No	18	Yes
RUS	Russia	110		90	60	0.03	Yes	All	12	Yes	Yes	Yes	No	18	Yes
S	Sweden	110		70	50	0.02	—N/a	All	—N/a	Yes	Recommended	Recommended	No	18	No
SK	Slovakia	130	90 (130 on express roads)	90 (100 on express roads)	50	0	Yes	All	12	Yes	Yes	Recommended	Yes	18 (17 with supervision of someone with 10+ years drive-experience)	Yes
SLO	Slovenia	130	110	90	50	0.05		All	12	Yes	Yes	Recommended	No	18	Yes
SRB	Serbia	130	100	80	50	0.02	Yes	All	12	Yes	Yes	Recommended	No	18 (17 with supervision of someone with 5+ years drive-experience)	Yes
TR	Turkey	120-140	110	90	50	0.05	Yes	All	10	Yes	Yes	Yes	No	18	Yes
UA	Ukraine	130	110	90	50	0	—N/a	All	12	Yes	Yes	Yes	No	18	Yes
UK	United Kingdom	113 (70 mph)	113 (70 mph)	97 (60 mph)	48 (30 mph); 32 (20 mph) (Wales)	0.08; 0.05 (Scotland)	—N/a	All	—N/a	Recommended	Recommended	Recommended	No	17	No
Country code	Country	Speed limit on motorway (km/h)	Speed limit on dual carriageway (km/h)	Speed limit on single carriageway (km/h)	Speed limit in urban areas (km/h)	Permitted alcohol level (%)	Toll roads	Seatbelt required	Minimum child age (front seat)	Triangle required	First aid required	Fire extinguisher required	Spare bulb required	Minimum driver's age	Tow rope required

== See also ==
- Speed limits by country
- Comparison of European road signs
