= Road signs in Hungary =

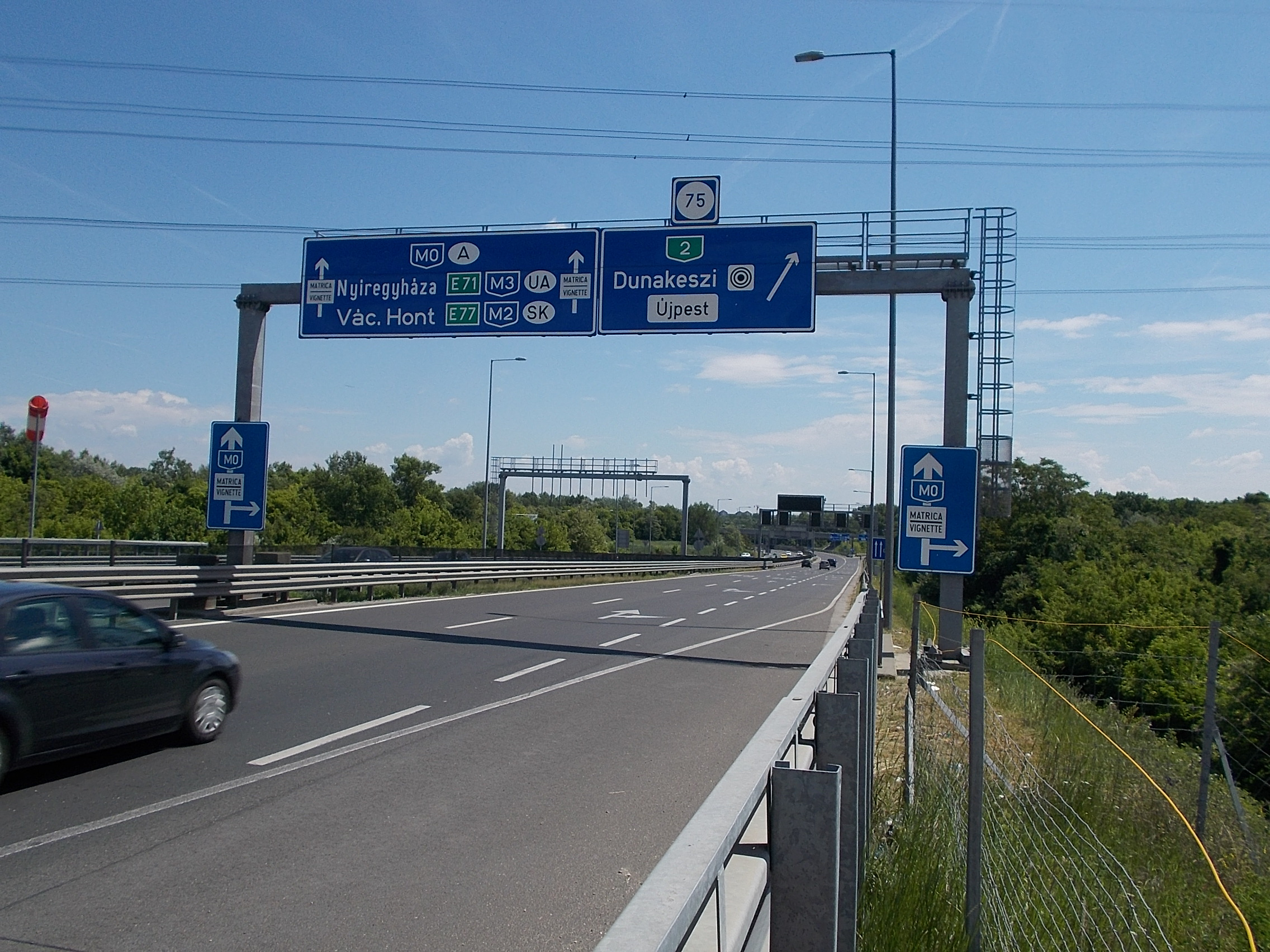
Road sign gantry near Megyeri Bridge

Road signs in Hungary are regulated in the Uniform Regulation of Road Provisions (KRESZ, Hungarian: Közúti Rendelkezések Egységes Szabályozása). Road signs generally conform to the 1968 Vienna Convention on Road Signs and Signals and the European Agreement supplementing it, as well as their amendments that came into force in 1995.

Hungary signed the Vienna Convention on Road Signs and Signals on 8 November 1968 and ratified it on 16 March 1976.

== Warning signs ==
A-001
Dangerous curve to left

A-002
Dangerous curve to right

A-003
Dangerous curves, first to left

A-004
Dangerous curves, first to right

A-005
Steep hill downwards

A-006
Steep hill upwards

A-007
Road narrows on both sides

A-008
Road narrows from left side

A-009
Road narrows from right side

A-010
Opening or swing bridge

A-011
Unprotected quayside or riverbank ahead (right)

A-012
Unprotected quayside or riverbank ahead (left)

A-013
Uneven road or speed bump

A-014
Speed bump

A-015
Road closed

A-016
Slippery road

A-017
Loose chippings

A-018
Falling rocks

A-019
Falling rocks

A-020
Pedestrian crossing

A-021
Children

A-021a
Children

A-022
Cyclists

A-023
Cattle ahead

A-024
Deer ahead

A-025
Roadworks

A-026
Traffic signals ahead

A-027
Yield to the right at next intersection

A-028
Crossroad with priority

A-029
Side road with priority on left

A-030
Side road with priority on right

A-031
Merging traffic on left

A-032
Merging traffic on right

A-033
Merging traffic on left

A-034
Merging traffic on right

A-035
Merging traffic on left and side road with priority on right

A-036
Merging traffic on right and side road with priority on left

A-037
Two-way traffic

A-038
Level crossing with gates or barriers

A-039
Level crossing without gates or barriers

A-040
Tramway

A-041
Railroad crossbuck (single-track)

A-042
Railroad crossbuck (multi-track)

A-045
Countdown beacon to railroad crossing on left side of road (150 meters to crossing)

A-046
Countdown beacon to railroad crossing on right side of road (150 meters to crossing)

A-047
Countdown beacon to railroad crossing on left side of road (100 meters to crossing)

A-048
Countdown beacon to railroad crossing on right side of road (100 meters to crossing)

A-049
Countdown beacon to railroad crossing on left side of road (50 meters to crossing)

A-050
Countdown beacon to railroad crossing on right side of road (50 meters to crossing)

A-051
Low-flying aircraft

A-052
Powerful crosswinds

A-053
Other dangers

A-054
Pedestrians

A-055
Tunnel

A-056
Roundabout

A-057
Traffic jam

== Priority signs ==
B-001
Give way

B-002
Stop

B-003
Priority road

B-004
End of priority road

B-005
Give way to oncoming vehicles

B-006
Priority over oncoming vehicles

== Prohibitory signs ==
C-001
No entry

C-002
Road closed to all traffic

C-003
No private vehicles

C-004
No motorcycles

C-005
No cyclists

C-006
No mopeds and power assisted bikes

C-007
No trucks

C-008
No trucks over 7.5 tons

C-009
No vehicles with trailers

C-010
No vehicles with trailers over 5 tons

C-011
No trucks

C-012
No vehicles carrying dangerous goods

C-013
No pedestrians

C-014
No animal-drawn carts

C-015
No handcarts

C-016
No farm vehicles

C-017
No vehicles carrying explosives and flammable goods

C-018
No vehicles carrying substances to cause water pollution

C-019
No entry for motor vehicles

C-020
No entry for farm vehicles, horse drawn carriages or cyclists

C-021
Width limit

C-022
Height limit

C-023
Weight limit

C-024
Axle weight limit

C-025
Length limit

C-026
Distance limit

C-027
Distance between trucks limit

C-028
No left turn or U-turn

C-029
No right turn

C-030
No U-turn

C-031
No overtaking

C-032
No overtaking by trucks

C-033
Speed limit (30 km/h)

C-034
Customs checkpoint

C-035
Customs checkpoint (ZOLL in German),old

C-036
Customs checkpoint (CLO in Slovak),old

C-037
Customs checkpoint (МИТНИЦЯ in Ukrainian)

C-038
Customs checkpoint (VAMA in Romanian)

C-039
Customs checkpoint (CARINA in Serbian)

C-040
Ferry

C-041
Police

C-042
No buses

C-043
End of all restrictions and prohibitions

C-044
End of speed limit

C-045
End of overtaking prohibition

C-046
End of overtaking prohibition for trucks

C-047
No parking (waiting permitted for 5 minutes with engine running and driver in vehicle)

C-048
No stopping

C-049
Toll payment ahead

== Mandatory signs ==
D-001
Proceed straight only

D-002
Turn left only

D-003
Turn right only

D-004
Proceed straight or turn left

D-005
Proceed straight or turn right

D-006
Mandatory passage straight to the right

D-007
Mandatory passage straight to the left

D-008
Turn right ahead

D-009
Turn left ahead

D-010
Turn left or right

D-011
Proceed straight, turn left or right

D-012
U-turn only

D-013
Turn left or U-turn

D-014
Pass sign on the right side

D-015 Pass sign on the left side

D-016
Pass either side

D-017
Roundabout (accompanied by B-001)

D-018
Vehicles carrying dangerous goods may turn right only

D-019
Vehicles carrying dangerous goods may turn left only

D-020
Vehicles carrying dangerous goods may proceed straight ahead only

D-021
Minimum speed limit

D-022
End of minimum speed limit

D-023
Bicycle path

D-024
End of bicycle path

D-025
Pedestrian path

D-026
End of pedestrian path

D-027
Shared pedestrian and cycle path (no separation)

D-028
End of shared pedestrian and cycle path (no separation)

D-029
Shared pedestrian and cycle path (with separation)

D-030
End of shared pedestrian and cycle path (with separation)

D-031
Shared pedestrian and cycle path (with separation)

D-032
End of shared pedestrian and cycle path (with separation)

D-033
You must install snow chains when snowing

D-034
Remove snow chains

D-037
Bicycles may proceed straight or turn right

D-038
Buses may proceed straight or turn right

== Information signs ==
E-001
Minimum speed limit on the lane

E-002
End of minimum speed limit on the lane

E-003
Minimum speed limit on lanes

E-004
Minimum speed limit on lanes

E-005
Bus and bicycle lane

E-006
Bus lane

E-007
End of bus lane

E-008
Bicycle lane

E-009
End of bicycle lane

E-010
Separate bicycle lane

E-011
End of separate bicycle lane

E-012
One-way traffic

E-013
One-way traffic on side street

E-014
Mandatory direction of lanes

E-015
Mandatory direction of lanes

E-016
Highway road

E-017
End of highway road

E-018
Road for motor vehicles

E-019
End of road for motor vehicles

E-020
City limit

E-021
End of city limit

E-022
City limit

E-023
End of city limit

E-024
Built-up area limit

E-025
End of built-up area limit

E-026
No parking zone

E-027
End of no parking zone

E-028
Maximum speed limit zone

E-029
End of maximum speed limit zone

E-030
No trucks over 7.5 tons zone

E-031
End of no trucks over 7.5 tons zone

E-032
Pedestrian zone

E-033
End of pedestrian zone

E-034
Parking zone

E-035
End of parking zone

E-036
Shared zone for pedestrians and cyclists

E-037
End of shared zone

E-038
Pedestrian crossing

E-039
Bus stop

E-040
Trolleybus stop

E-041
Tramway stop

E-042
Taxi stop

E-043
Residential zone

E-044
End of residential zone

E-045
Hospital

E-046
Parking

E-047
Parking distance

E-048
Parking for trucks

E-049
Parking building

E-050
Roadside cycle path begins

E-051
Bicycle path next to the road

E-052
End of roadside cycle path

E-053
Park and ride

E-054
Parking area for people with reduced mobility

E-060
Lane movement ahead

== Indication signs ==
F-001
First aid

F-002
Breakdown service

F-003
Telephone

F-004
Filling station

F-005
Hotel or motel

F-006
Restaurant

F-007
Refreshment

F-008
Hiking

F-009
Camping site

F-010
Caravan site

F-011
Camping and caravan site

F-012
Youth hostel

F-013
Radio

F-014
Toilet

F-015
Swimming place

F-016
Filling station with unleaded fuel

F-017
A filling station selling unleaded gasoline and autogas

F-018
Ship station

F-019
Railway station

F-020
Airport

F-021
Information point

F-022
Chevron (left)

F-023
Chevron (right)

F-024
Chevron (left)

F-025
Chevron (right)

F-026
Vertical chevron

F-027
Vertical chevron

F-028
Vertical chevron

F-029
Movable bridge or ferry

F-030
Police

F-031
Traffic control

F-035 Narrow chevron (left)

F-036 Narrow chevron (right)

F-037
Social Internet access point

== Information signs ==
G-001
Left lane merges

G-002
Tunnel

G-003
Recommended speed

G-004
End of recommended speed

G-076
Tabular road sign on a local road

G-106
Route confirmation sign with an indirect destination

G-202
County border (Megye - obsolete)

G-205
European Union country border

G-301
Dead end

G-302
Dead end with cycling

G-305
Pedestrian underpass (with stairs)

G-306
Pedestrian overpass (with stairs)

G-307
Pedestrian underpass (with ramp)

G-308
Pedestrian overpass (with ramp)

G-312
Dead end on side street

G-313
Dead end on side street

G-351
Motorway exit

G-401
National speed limits

G-653
Distance till cities (with special signs for border crossings or separate countries)

== Additional signs ==
H-001
Curved main road (90° left)

H-002
Curved main road (45° right)

H-003
Curved main road (90° right)

H-004
Curved main road (45° right)

H-005
Curved main road (90° left)

H-006
Curved main road (90° left)

H-007
Yield to curved main road

H-008
Yield to curved main road

H-009
Yield to curved main road

H-010
Yield to curved main road

H-011
"Stop! Right of way is mandatory," in 300m

H-012
Period of time

H-013
Two periods of time

H-014
Days of the week and period of time

H-015
Days of the week with periods

H-016
Period of time in hours

H-017
Distance until road sign enforced

H-018
Length while sign is enforced

H-019
Length and distance

H-020
Distance and direction

H-021
Controlled by officer

H-022
Light barrier

H-023
Prepare to stop for tram passengers crossing

H-024
A tree extending into a hollow section

H-025
Frogs

H-026
In case of snowfall

H-027
In case of rain

H-028
Road closure

H-029
Transverse traffic

H-030
Loose shoulder / ditch

H-031
Tracked road section

H-032
Multiplication

H-033
Traffic order change

H-034
Risk of accident

H-035
Arrow pointing to a traffic lane

H-036
Traffic calming central island

H-037
Vertical alignment

H-038
Diagonal alignment

H-039
Parking on the sidewalk in full formation (left)

H-040
Parking on the sidewalk in full formation (right)

H-041
Parking on the sidewalk with a half-wheel (left)

H-042
Parking on the sidewalk with a half-wheel (right)

H-043
Parking crosswise on the sidewalk, in full formation (left)

H-044
Parking crosswise on the sidewalk, in full formation (right)

H-045
Parking crosswise on the sidewalk, half standing (left)

H-046
Parking crosswise on the sidewalk, half standing (right)

H-047
Number of taxis

H-048
Offending vehicle will be towed

H-049
For disabled people

H-050
Parking meter

H-051
Place clock in dashboard (in case you can only park for one hour)

H-052
A barrier that can be kept closed for more than ten minutes

H-053
Fee payment obligation

H-054
Ticket exchange location

H-055
Beginning of prohibition

H-056
End of prohibition

H-057
The centre of prohibition

H-058
Loading area

H-059
Diesel

H-060
Car gas

H-061
For passenger cars

H-062
For trucks

H-063
For buses

H-064
For motorcycles

H-065
For mopeds

H-066
For bicycles

H-067
For agricultural tractors

H-068
For tramways

H-069
For trucks with trailers

H-070
For off-road passenger cars

H-071
For semi-trailer trucks

H-072
For cars with caravans

H-073
For caravans

H-074
For camper vans

H-075
For heavy trailers

H-076
For trolleybuses

H-077
Ro-La (transportation of trucks by rail)

H-078
A private road

H-079
Except for delivery of goods

H-080
Except for destination traffic

H-081
Except for [public transport company]

H-082
Except police

H-083
Except with permission

H-084
Except for passenger vehicles

H-085
Except for trucks

H-086
Except for buses

H-087
Except for motorcycles

H-088
Except for mopeds

H-089
Except for bicycles

H-090
Except for agricultural vehicles

H-091
Except for trams (tramway)

H-092
Except for trucks with trailers

H-093
Except for personal vehicles with trailers

H-094
Except for semi-trailer trucks

H-095
Except for cars with caravans

H-096
Except for caravans (trailers)

H-097
Except for caravans (vehicles)

H-098
Except for heavy trailers

H-099
Except for disabled people

H-100
Except for trolleybuses

H-101
Except for taxi

H-102
Direction of movement of pedestrians (left)

H-103
Direction of movement of pedestrians (right)

H-104
Speed reduction rib

H-105
Tourist destination name

H-106
Branded board

H-107
The provision of the railway crossing has changed

H-108
Offending vehicles will be clamped

H-109
Stopping (waiting) on the bench is prohibited

H-110
Stopping (waiting) on the bench is prohibited

H-111
Priority for cyclists crossing the road

H-112
Priority for cyclists crossing the road

H-113
Priority for cyclists crossing the road

H-114
Covered bicycle storage

H-115
Two-way bicycle traffic

H-116
Two-way bus traffic

H-118
Two-way bus traffic in the transverse direction

H-119
Crossing bus traffic from the right

H-120
Crossing bus traffic from the left

H-121
Two-way bicycle traffic in the transverse direction

H-122
Crossing bicycle traffic from the right

H-123
Bicycling traffic from the left in a diagonal direction

H-124
Two-way bus and bicycle traffic in the transverse direction

H-125
Crossing bus and bicycle traffic from the left

== Tourist signs ==
I-001
Zoo

I-004
Lookout point

I-005
National park

I-025
Theatre, outdoor stage

I-026
Museum

I-031
Graveyard

I-032
Temple

I-034
Castle

I-037
Water mill

I-040
Pharmacy

I-044
Information

I-045
Potable water

== Obsolete signs ==
=== 1953 road signs ===
==== Priority signs ====
Priority road

Stop

Yield

==== Warning signs ====
Uneven road

Right curve

Left curve

Double right curve

Double left curve

Crossroad

Railway crossing with gates

Railway crossing without gates

Steep descent

Road narrows

Roadworks

Pedestrian crossing

Other danger

Countdown marker

Countdown marker

Countdown marker

Countdown marker

General caution (hospital)

==== Prohibitory signs ====
No vehicles

No motor vehicles except motorcycles

No motorcycles

No motor vehicles

No trucks

No bicycles

No horse-drawn carts

No handcarts

Weight limit

Width limit

Height limit

Speed limit

Checkpoint

Customs

No overtaking

No honking

No stopping

No parking

No entry

Speed limit ends

==== Mandatory signs ====
Turn right

Turn left

Proceed straight

Proceed straight or right

Proceed straight or left

One-way traffic

Bicycle path

==== Information signs ====
Parking

Dead end

First aid

Repair service

Public telephone

Petrol station

Route number

Settlement sign

Direction sign

Advance direction sign

=== 1962 road signs ===
==== Priority signs ====
Priority road

Priority road ends

Stop

Yield

==== Warning signs ====
Uneven road

Right curve

Left curve

Double right curve

Double left curve

Crossroad

Crossroad with priority

Railway crossing with gates

Railway crossing without gates

Steep descent

Road narrows

Two-way traffic

Slippery road

Roadworks

Draw bridge

Pedestrian crossing

Children

Animals (domesticated)

Animals (wild)

Low-flying planes

Other danger

Countdown marker

Countdown marker

Countdown marker

Countdown marker

==== Prohibitory signs ====
No entry

No vehicles

No motor vehicles except motorcycles

No motorcycles

No motor vehicles

No trucks

No bicycles

No horse-drawn carts

No handcarts

No agricultural vehicles

Weight limit

Axle load limit

Width limit

Height limit

Speed limit

Customs

No stopping

No parking

No overtaking

No honking

No right turn

No left turn

Speed limit ends

No overtaking ends

No honking ends

==== Mandatory signs ====
Turn right

Turn left

Proceed straight

Proceed straight or right

Proceed straight or left

Keep right

Keep left

Lane split

Roundabout

Bicycle path

==== Information signs ====
One-way traffic

Parking

First aid

Hospital

Dead end

Repair service

Telephone

Gas station

Settlement sign

Direction sign

Advance direction sign

Route number

=== 1995 road signs ===
Pedestrian crossing ahead

Children crossing

Pedestrians ahead

Pedestrian path

End of pedestrian path

Pedestrian crossing
