= Road signs in Georgia =

Pedestrian crossing sign, located in Tbilisi.

Road signs in Georgia are similar to the road sign system of other post-Soviet states that ensure that transport vehicles move safely and orderly, as well as to inform the participants of traffic built-in graphic icons. However, some road signs look a bit different from Soviet ones and closer to the European ones. These icons are governed by the Vienna Convention on Road Traffic and Vienna Convention on Road Signs and Signals.

Inscriptions on road signs in Georgia are usually written in two languages: Georgian and English, including the names of settlements. The Russian language is sometimes found on road signs in Georgia, mainly on old Soviet-era road signs, but now rarely used.

== Gallery ==
=== Warning signs ===
Level crossing, with barriers or gates

Level crossing, without barriers or gates

Level crossing (single track)

Level crossing (multiple tracks)

Level crossing countdown

Level crossing countdown

Level crossing countdown

Level crossing countdown

Level crossing countdown

Level crossing countdown

Tramway crossing

Crossroads with priority to the right

Roundabout

Traffic signal

Opening or swing bridge

Unprotected quayside or riverbank

Dangerous curve to the right

Dangerous curve to the left

Dangerous curve, first to the right

Dangerous curve, first to the left

Steep descent

Steep ascent

Slippery road

Uneven road

Speed bumps

Loose chippings

Dangerous shoulder

Road narrows on both sides

Road narrows on right side

Road narrows on left side

Two-way traffic

Pedestrian crossing

Children

cyclists ahead

Roadworks

Cattle in the road

Deer in the road

Falling rock surface

Crosswinds

Low-flying aircraft

Tunnel ahead

Traffic congestion

Other dangers

Curve chevron

Curve chevron

Curve chevron

Curve chevron

T-chevron

=== Priority signs ===
Priority road

End of priority road

Intersection with side roads

Side road, from the right

Side road, from the left

Give way

Stop

Give way to oncoming traffic

Priority over oncoming vehicles

=== Prohibitory signs ===
Do not enter

Road closed to all traffic

No motor vehicles

No heavy goods vehicles

No motorcycles

No farm vehicles

No vehicles pulling trailers

No animal-drawn vehicles

No cyclists

No pedestrians

Weight limit

Axle weight limit

Height limit

Width limit

Length Limit

Minimum separation limit

Passing without stopping prohibited

Stop for danger including traffic accidents

Stop for other road control

No right turn

No left turn

No U-turn

No overtaking

End of overtaking prohibition

No overtaking by heavy goods vehicles

End of overtaking prohibition by heavy goods vehicles

Speed limit

End of speed limit

No audible warning devices

No stopping or standing

No parking or waiting

Alternate parking on odd days

Alternate parking on even days

End of all prohibitions

No entry for vehicles carrying dangerous goods

No entry for vehicles carrying explosive substances

No vehicles carrying substance liable to cause water pollution

=== Mandatory signs ===
Ahead only

Turn right

Turn left

Straight ahead or right turn permitted

Straight ahead or left turn permitted

Turn right or left (no straight ahead)

Pass onto right

Pass onto left

Roundabout

Motor vehicles only

Cyclist path

End of cyclist path

Sidewalk

Cyclist path and sidewalk

End of cyclist path and sidewalk

Cyclist path and sidewalk with divided directions

End of cyclist path and sidewalk with divided directions

Minimum speed limit

End of minimum speed limit

Mandatory usage of snow chains

Proceed straight for vehicles carrying dangerous goods

Turn right for vehicles carrying dangerous goods

Turn left for vehicles carrying dangerous goods

=== Special regulation signs ===
Freeway begins

Freeway ends

Road for motor vehicles begins

Road for motor vehicles ends

One-way street

End of one-way street

One-way street on the right

One-way street on the left

Reversible lane

End of reversible lane

Departure to reversible lane

Road with a contraflow lane for buses

End of a road with contraflow lane for buses

Exit to the road with a contraflow bus lane to the left

Exit to the road with a contraflow bus lane to the right

Lane for buses

End of a lane for buses

Mandatory direction of lanes

Mandatory direction of lane (proceed straight ahead)

Mandatory direction of lane (Proceed straight or turn right/left)

Mandatory direction of lane (Turn right/left)

Mandatory direction of lane (Turn right of motorway or expressway exit)

Mandatory direction of lane (Proceed straight or turn right or left then make a U-turn)

Added lane from right

Added lane from right

Added lane from right

Added lane from left

Added lane from left

End of a right lane

End of a left lane

Traffic directions in traffic lanes

Traffic directions in traffic lanes

Traffic direction in traffic lane

Speed limit lanes

Added lane from junction

Added lane from junction

Bus stop

Tram stop

Taxi stand

Pedestrian crossing

Pedestrian crossing

Speed bumps

Residential area

End of residential area

City limit begins

Built-up area begins

City limit ends

Built-up area ends

City limit begins

City limit ends

No parking zone

End of no parking zone

Parking zone

End of parking zone

Speed limit zone

End of speed limit zone

Pedestrian zone

End of pedestrian zone

Yield to merging traffic

=== Service signs ===
First aid post

Hospital

Emergency telephone

Fire extinguisher

Petrol station

Breakdown service

Car wash

Public telephone

Restaurant

Refreshment

Water drinking

Hotel

Camping site

Resting place

Traffic police

Police

Toilet

Transport controlling place

Radio channel for providing road traffic information

Radio communication area with emergency services

=== Information signs ===
Speed limits indicator

Country border sign

Advisory speed

U-turn permitted

U-turn length

Parking

Emergency escape from runaway vehicles

Emergency stop lane

Pedestrian underpass

Pedestrian overpass

No through road

No through road on the right

No through road on the left

Direction indicator

Direction indicator

Direction indicator

Direction indicator

Direction scheme

Direction indicator

River name

Distance indicator

Kilometer sign

Route number

Route number

Route number

Route number

Route number

Route number

Route number

Heavy goods vehicles proceed straight only

Heavy goods vehicles turn right only

Stop line (option 1)

Stop line (option 2)

Scheme of bypass road

Detour marker

Detour marker

Detour marker

Road closed, return into oncoming road

Do not drive into oncoming road, return to your road

Emergency exit escaping (left side)

Emergency exit escaping (right side)

Speed cameras

=== Additional panels ===
Distance

Stop ahead

Side extension (of No stopping or No parking)

Side extension (of No stopping or No parking)

Length

Beginning (of No stopping or No parking)

Continuation (of No stopping or No parking)

Ending (of No stopping or No parking)

Direction of validity to the right

Direction of validity to the left

Direction of validity in both turns

Heavy goods vehicles only

Vehicles with trailer only

Motor cars only

Buses only

Farm vehicles only

Motorcycles only

Cyclists only

Vehicles carrying dangerous goods only

Weekends and holidays

Working days

Weekdays

Time period

Time period in weekends and holidays

Time period in working days

Time period in weekdays

Type of vehicle parking

Type of vehicle parking

Type of vehicle parking

Type of vehicle parking

Type of vehicle parking

Type of vehicle parking

Type of vehicle parking

Type of vehicle parking

Type of vehicle parking

Turn off the engine

Payment services

Parking duration limit

Vehicle inspection

Weight limit

Dangerous shoulder

Direction of priority road

Driving lane

Blind pedestrians

Frost covering

Wet coating

Disabled parking

Type of road accident

Type of road accident

Type of road accident

Type of road accident

Road passing

Road passing

Road passing

Tow truck is working

Traffic cameras

Electric cars
