= Road signs in the Soviet Union =

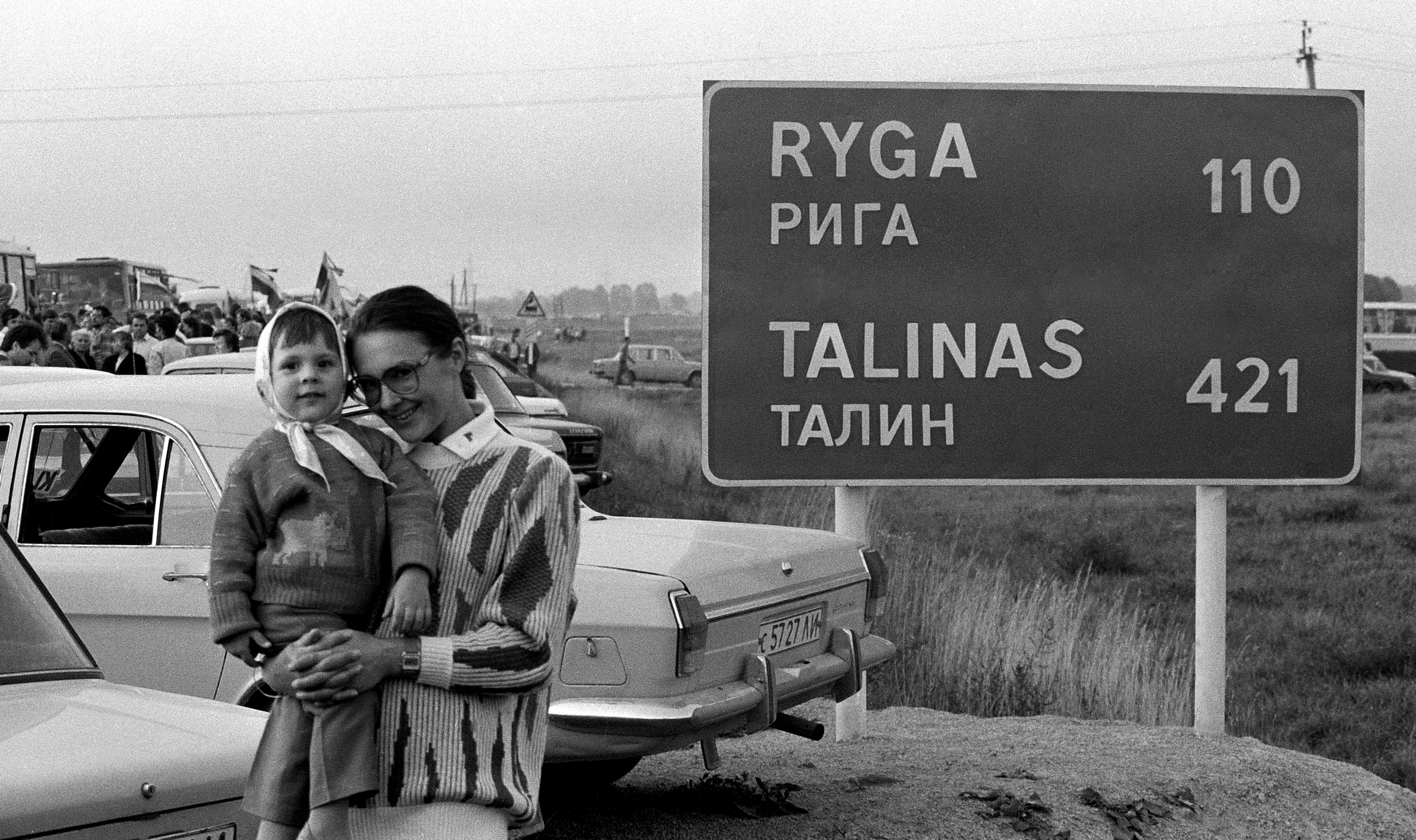
A Soviet-era road sign in Lithuania during the Baltic Way in 1989. The names of settlements are written in large font size in Lithuanian (Latin script), and in smaller font size in Russian (Cyrillic script).

Road signs in the Soviet Union were regulated in the GOST 10807-78 standard which was introduced on 1 January 1980. This standard also specified the typeface used on road signs. After the dissolution of the Soviet Union in 1991, this standard continued to apply in all countries that were formerly Soviet republics until some of them adopted their own national standards for road signs. The shapes and colors of road signs in the Soviet Union, and now in all post-Soviet states, fully comply with the 1968 Vienna Convention on Road Signs and Signals, to which the Soviet Union was originally a signatory. On 8 November 1968, the Soviet Union signed the Vienna Convention on Road Signs and Signals, and on 7 June 1974 ratified it with some declarations and reservations made upon ratification.

Road signs in the Soviet Union were divided into 7 categories:

1. Warning signs
2. Priority signs
3. Prohibitory signs
4. Mandatory signs
5. Information signs
6. Service signs
7. Additional signs

Below are images of road signs used in the Soviet Union before its dissolution in 1991. The galleries shown below do not show road signs that were included in the GOST 10807-78 standard after 1991. The vast majority of road signs shown below are still used in post-Soviet states such as Russia, Armenia, Azerbaijan, Belarus, Georgia, Kazakhstan, Kyrgyzstan, Lithuania, Tajikistan, Turkmenistan, Ukraine, and Uzbekistan but with some modifications in design.

== Road signs of 1980 ==
=== Warning signs ===
1.1 Railway crossing with barriers

1.2 Railway crossing without barriers

1.3.1 Single-track railway

1.3.2 Multi-track railway

1.4.1 Approaching a railway crossing

1.4.2 Approaching a railway crossing

1.4.3 Approaching a railway crossing

1.4.4 Approaching a railway crossing

1.4.5 Approaching a railway crossing

1.4.6 Approaching a railway crossing

1.5 Tramway crossing

1.6 Intersection of equivalent roads

1.7 Roundabout

1.8 Traffic signals

1.9 Drawbridge

1.10 Exit to the embankment

1.11.1 Sharp curve to the right

1.11.2 Sharp curve to the left

1.12.1 Sharp curves, first to the right

1.12.2 Sharp curves, first to the left

1.13 Steep descent

1.14 Steep ascent

1.15 Slippery road

1.16 Rough road

1.17 Gravel surface

1.18.1 Narrowing of the road on both sides

1.18.2 Narrowing of the road on the right

1.18.3 Narrowing of the road on the left

1.19.1 Two-way traffic

1.20 Pedestrian crossing

1.21 Children

1.22 Bicycle path crossing

1.23 Roadworks

1.24 Cattle

1.25 Wild animals

1.26 Rockfall

1.27 Crosswind

1.28 Low-flying aircraft

1.29 Tunnel

1.30 Other hazards

1.31.1 Hazard chevron

1.31.2 Hazard chevron

1.31.3 Hazard chevron

=== Priority signs ===
2.1 Priority road

2.2 End of priority road

2.3.1 Intersection with a minor road

2.3.2 Side road intersection with a minor road

2.3.3 Side road intersection with a minor road

2.4 Give way

2.5 Stop sign

2.6 Give way to oncoming traffic

2.7 Priority over oncoming traffic

=== Prohibitory signs ===
3.1 No entry

3.2 No vehicles

3.3 No motor vehicles

3.4 No lorries

3.5 No motorcycles

3.6 No tractors

3.7 No vehicles with trailer (and truck)

3.8 No horse-drawn carts

3.9 No cycling

3.10 No pedestrians

3.11 Weight limit

3.12 Weight limit per axle

3.13 Height limit

3.14 Width limit

3.15 Length limit

3.16 Minimum distance limit

3.17 Customs

3.18.1 No right turn

3.18.2 No left turn

3.19 No U-turn

3.20 No overtaking

3.21 End of overtaking restriction

3.22 No overtaking by lorries

3.23 End of overtaking by lorries restriction

3.24 Maximum speed limit

3.25 End of maximum speed limit

3.26 No beeping

3.27 No stopping

3.28 No parking

3.29 No parking on odd days of the month

3.30 No parking on even days of the month

3.31 End of all restrictions

=== Mandatory signs ===
4.1.1 Proceed straight

4.1.2 Turn right

4.1.3 Turn left

4.1.4 Proceed straight or turn right

4.1.5 Proceed straight or turn left

4.1.6 Turn left or right

4.2.1 Keep right

4.2.2 Keep left

4.2.3 Keep right or left

4.3 Roundabout

4.4 Cars only

4.5 Cycle path

4.6 Footpath

4.7 Minimum speed limit

4.8 End of minimum speed limit

=== Information signs ===
5.1 Motorway

5.2 End of the motorway

5.3 Road for cars

5.4 End of the road for cars

5.5 One-way road

5.6 End of one-way road

5.7.1 Exit to a one-way road

5.7.2 Exit to a one-way road

5.8.1 Lane directions

5.8.2 Lane directions

5.8.2 Lane directions

5.8.2 Lane directions

5.8.2 Lane directions

5.8.2 Lane directions

5.8.2 Lane directions

5.8.2 Lane directions

5.8.3 The beginning of the lane

5.8.3 The beginning of the lane

5.8.4 The beginning of the lane

5.8.5 End of the lane

5.8.6 End of the lane

5.8.7 Lane direction

5.8.7 Lane direction

5.8.8 Lane direction

5.8.8 Lane direction

5.9 Bus lane

5.10.1 A road with a line for fixed-route vehicles

5.10.2 Exit to the road with a lane for fixed-route vehicles

5.10.3 Exit to the road with a lane for fixed-route vehicles

5.11.1 U-turn

5.11.2 U-turn area

5.12 Bus and/or trolleybus stop location

5.13 Tram stop location

5.14 Taxi stop

5.15 Parking

5.16.1 Pedestrian crossing

5.16.2 Pedestrian crossing

5.17.1 Subway (underpass)

5.17.2 Subway (underpass)

5.17.3 Footbridge

5.17.4 Footbridge

5.18 Recommended speed

5.19.1 Dead end

5.19.2 Dead end

5.19.3 Dead end

5.20.1 A preliminary sign of directions

5.20.1 A preliminary sign of directions

5.20.2 A preliminary sign of direction

5.20.2 A preliminary sign of direction

5.20.3 Traffic scheme

5.21.1 Pointing direction

5.21.1 Pointing direction

5.21.2 Pointing directions

5.22.1 Entrance to built-up area

5.23.1 End of built-up area

5.24 Entrance to locality

5.25 End of locality

5.26 Object name (river name)

5.26 Object name (street name)

5.27 Distance indicator

5.28 Kilometer sign

5.29.1 Route number

5.29.1 Route number

5.29.2 Route number and direction

5.29.2 Route number and direction

5.29.2 Route number and direction

5.30.1 Direction of movement for trucks

5.30.2 Direction of movement for trucks

5.30.3 Direction of movement for trucks

5.31 Detour scheme

5.32.1 Detour direction

5.32.2 Detour direction

5.32.3 Detour direction

5.33 Stop line

=== Service signs ===
6.1 Point of medical care

6.2 Hospital

6.3 Gas station

6.4 Vehicle maintenance

6.5 Car washing

6.6 Phone

6.7 Food point

6.8 Drinking water

6.9 Hotel or motel

6.10 Camping

6.11 Place of rest

6.12 Traffic police

=== Additional signs ===
7.1.1 Distance to the object

7.1.2 Distance to the object

7.1.3 Distance to the object

7.1.4 Distance to the object

7.2.1 Coverage area

7.2.2 Coverage area

7.2.3 Coverage area

7.2.4 Coverage area

7.2.5 Coverage area

7.2.6 Coverage area

7.3.1 Directions of action

7.3.2 Directions of action

7.3.3 Directions of action

7.4.1 Type of vehicle

7.4.2 Type of vehicle

7.4.3 Type of vehicle

7.4.4 Type of vehicle

7.4.5 Type of vehicle

7.4.6 Type of vehicle

7.4.7 Type of vehicle

7.5.1 Saturdays, Sundays and holidays

7.5.2 Working days

7.5.3 Days of the week

7.5.4 Validity period

7.5.5 Validity period

7.5.6 Validity period

7.5.7 Validity period

7.6.1 Method of parking the vehicle

7.6.2 Method of parking the vehicle

7.6.3 Method of parking the vehicle

7.6.4 Method of parking the vehicle (park in backwards)

7.6.5 Method of parking the vehicle (front wheels of car facing curb)

7.7 No idling engine while parked here (In Belarus, it has been replaced by the Number of dangerous turns)

7.8 Paid services

7.9 Limitation of parking duration

7.10 Place for car inspection

7.11 Limitation of the permitted maximum mass

7.12 Dangerous roadside (In Belarus, it has been replaced by the Road marking)

7.13 Direction of the main road

7.14 Traffic lane

7.15 Blind pedestrians

=== 1986 addition ===
3.17.2 Danger

5.10.4 End of the road with a lane for fixed-route vehicles

5.34.1 Preliminary index of the lane change to another carriageway

5.34.2 Preliminary index of the lane change to another carriageway

5.35 Reversible lane

5.36 End of reversible lane

5.37 Entrance to a road with reversible lane

7.16 Wet coating

7.17 Disabled people

7.18 Except for the disabled

=== 1994 addition ===
Following the collapse of the USSR, this amendment established GOST 10807-78 as a permanent, cross-border standard applicable not only in Russia but also in many post-Soviet states (the CIS).

3.32 No vehicles with dangerous goods

3.33 No vehicles with explosive and flammable loads

4.9.1 Direction of movement of vehicles with dangerous goods

4.9.2 Direction of movement of vehicles with dangerous goods

4.9.3 Direction of movement of vehicles with dangerous goods

5.38 Residential area

5.39 End of residential area

6.13 International road transport control

7.4.8 Type of vehicle

7.19 Dangerous goods classification

== Road signs of 1973 ==
=== Warning signs ===
1.1 Railroad crossing with gates

1.2 Railroad crossing without gates

1.3 Tram crossing

1.4 Intersection

1.5а Intersection with priority

1.5б Intersection with priority (right)

1.5в Intersection with priority (left)

1.6 Yield

1.7 Traffic lights ahead

1.8 Draw bridge or ferry

1.9 Embankment

1.10а Curve to the right

1.10б Curve to the left

1.11а Double curve, or a series of curves, the first to the right

1.11б Double curve, or a series of curves, the first to the left

1.12 Steep descent

1.13 Steep ascent

1.14 Rough road

1.15 Slippery road

1.16 Loose gravel

1.17а Road narrows

1.17б Road narrows (right)

1.17в Road narrows (left)

1.18 Two-way traffic

1.19 Pedestrian crossing ahead

1.20 Children

1.21 Roadworks

1.22а Animals (domesticated)

1.22б Animals (wild)

1.23 Falling rocks

1.24 Crosswinds

1.25 Other hazards

=== Prohibitory signs ===
2.1 Do not enter

2.2 Closed to all vehicles

2.3 No cars

2.4 No trucks

2.5 No motorcycles

2.6 No animal-drawn vehicles

2.7 No tractors

2.8 No vehicles with trailer

2.9 No cycles

2.10 No pedestrians

2.11 Weight limit

2.12 Weight limit per axle

2.13 Height limit

2.14 Width limit

2.15 Stop

2.16а No left turn

2.16б No right turn

2.17 No U-turn

2.18 No overtaking

2.19 No overtaking by lorries

2.20 Speed limit

2.21 No beeping

2.22 No stopping

2.23 No parking

2.24 Yield to oncoming traffic

2.25а End of overtaking restriction

2.25б End of overtaking by lorries restriction

2.25в End of speed limit

2.25г End of all restrictions

=== Mandatory signs ===
3.1а Mandatory direction (Proceed straight)

3.1б Mandatory direction (Turn right)

3.1в Mandatory direction (Turn left)

3.1г Mandatory direction (Proceed straight or turn right)

3.1д Mandatory direction (Proceed straight or turn left)

3.2 Roundabout

3.3а Keep right

3.3б Keep left

3.4 Cars only

3.5 Bike path

3.6 Footpath

3.7 Minimum speed limit

3.8 End of minimum speed limit

=== Information signs ===
4.1 Priority road

4.2 End of priority road

4.3 Expressway

4.4 End of the expressway

4.5а Beginning of a built-up area

4.5б Beginning of a built-up area

4.6а End of a built-up area

4.6б End of a built-up area

4.7 Priority over oncoming traffic

4.8 Preselection sign

4.9а One way traffic

4.9б One way traffic

4.9в One way traffic

4.10а Dead end

4.10б Dead end

4.12 Parking

4.13 Pedestrian crossing

4.20 Gas station

4.21 Breakdown service

4.22 First aid station or hospital

4.23 Public telephone

4.24 Restaurant

4.25 Hotel

4.26 Camping

=== Additional signs ===
5.1 Coverage area

5.2а Distance to the object

5.2б Distance to the object

5.2в Stop ahead

5.3а Coverage area

5.3б Coverage area

5.3в Coverage area

5.7 Only road user category shown

5.8а Railroad crossing countdown marker (240m)

5.8б Railroad crossing countdown marker (160m)

5.8в Railroad crossing countdown marker (80m)

5.10 Direction of priority road

Crossbuck (one track)

Crossbuck (two or more tracks)

== Road signs of 1961 ==
=== Warning signs ===
Railroad crossing without gates

Railroad crossing with gates

Crossroad

Crossroad with priority

Yield

Right curve

Left curve

Double curve

Steep descent

Uneven road

Slippery road

Road narrows

Opening bridge

Two-way traffic

Pedestrian crossing

Children

Roadworks

Domesticated animals

Wild animals

Other danger

Countdown beacon

Countdown beacon

Countdown beacon

Countdown beacon

=== Prohibitory signs ===
No entry

No vehicles

No motor vehicles

No trucks

No motorcycles

No horse carts

No agricultural vehicles

No bicycles

Weight limit

Axle load limit

Height limit

Width limit

Stop

No left turn

No right turn

No overtaking

No overtaking for trucks

Speed limit

No beeping

No stopping

No parking

End of all restrictions

=== Mandatory signs ===
Turn right

Turn left

Go straight

Go straight or right

Go straight or left

Keep right

Keep left

Roundabout

Motor vehicles only

Bicycle path

=== Information signs ===
Parking

U-turn permitted

Camping

First aid or hospital

Repair service

Telephone

Filling station

Priority road

End of priority road

== Road signs of 1953 ==
=== Warning signs ===
1.01 Railway crossing

1.02 Intersection

1.03 Sharp curves

1.04 Sharp curve to the right

1.05 Sharp curve to the left

1.06 Steep descent

1.07 Other hazards

1.08 Main road crossing

=== Prohibitory signs ===
2.01 No entry

2.02 No vehicles

2.03 No motor vehicles

2.04 No lorries

2.05 No motorcycles

2.06 No cycling

2.07 No horse-drawn carts

2.08 Weight limit

2.09 Height limit

2.10 No stopping

2.11 No parking

2.12 Speed limit

2.13 No overtaking

2.14 Trucks may not overtake

2.15 No beeping

=== Mandatory signs ===
3.01 Proceed straight

3.02 Turn right

3.03 Turn left

3.04 Proceed straight or turn right

3.05 Proceed straight or turn left

3.06 Turn right on red light

3.07 Turn right on green light

3.08 Proceed straight on green light

3.09 Turn left on green light

3.10 Turn left on red light

3.11 U-turn

3.12 Pedestrian crossing

3.13 Parking

== Road signs of 1945 ==
Crossroad

Series of bends

Level crossing

Danger

No vehicles

Do not enter

No motor vehicles with more than three wheels

Weight limit for motor vehicles

No motorcycles

No animal-drawn vehicles

No bicycles

Speed limit

No parking

No stopping

Height limit

Weight limit

No motor vehicles

No overtaking

No beeping

Mandatory direction

Parking

Caution recommended

== Road signs of 1937 ==
Series of bends

Crossroad

Level crossing

Danger

No vehicles

No motor vehicles except motorcycles

Motor vehicle weight limit

No bicycles

No animal-drawn vehicles

Speed limit

No stopping

No parking

Mandatory direction

Parking

Caution

Frist aid

== Road signs of 1933 ==
Level crossing with barriers

Level crossing without barriers

Series of bends

Crossroad

Uneven road

Danger

No entry

No vehicles

No motor vehicles except motorcycles

No motor vehicles

No bicycles

No animal-drawn vehicles

No stopping

No parking

Speed limit

Weight limit

Height limit

Width limit

Parking

Caution

Mandatory direction

== Road signs of 1927 ==
Level crossing with barriers

Level crossing without barriers

Series of bends

Crossroad

Uneven road

Danger

== Post-Soviet states ==
The GOST 10807-78 standard is still valid (with additions) in Azerbaijan and Turkmenistan, but has been replaced by new standards in other states, i.e., national standards for road signs in each of the post-Soviet states:

- In Russia, it was replaced by the GOST R 52290-2004 standard on January 1, 2006. The same standard applies to road signs used in Kyrgyzstan since October 2019 and Armenia (with inscriptions in Armenian and English);
- In Ukraine, it was replaced by the DSTU 2586-94 standard on 1 May 1994, later DSTU 4100-2002 on January 1, 2003, DSTU 4100-2014 on July 1, 2015, DSTU 4100:2021 on November 1, 2021;
- In Belarus, it was replaced by the STB 1140-99 on October 1, 2001, later STB 1140-2013 on July 1, 2014;
- In Kazakhstan, it was replaced by the ST RK 1125-2002 standard on January 1, 2004, later ST RK 1125-2021 on July 1, 2022;
- In Uzbekistan, it was replaced by the O'zDST 3283:2017 standard on December 15, 2017.

== See also ==
- Comparison of European road signs
- Traffic signs in post-Soviet states
- Road signs in Armenia
- Road signs in Azerbaijan
- Road signs in Belarus
- Road signs in Estonia
- Road signs in Georgia
- Road signs in Kazakhstan
- Road signs in Kyrgyzstan
- Road signs in Latvia
- Road signs in Lithuania
- Road signs in Russia
- Road signs in Tajikistan
- Road signs in Turkmenistan
- Road signs in Ukraine
- Road signs in Uzbekistan
