= Road signs in Uzbekistan =

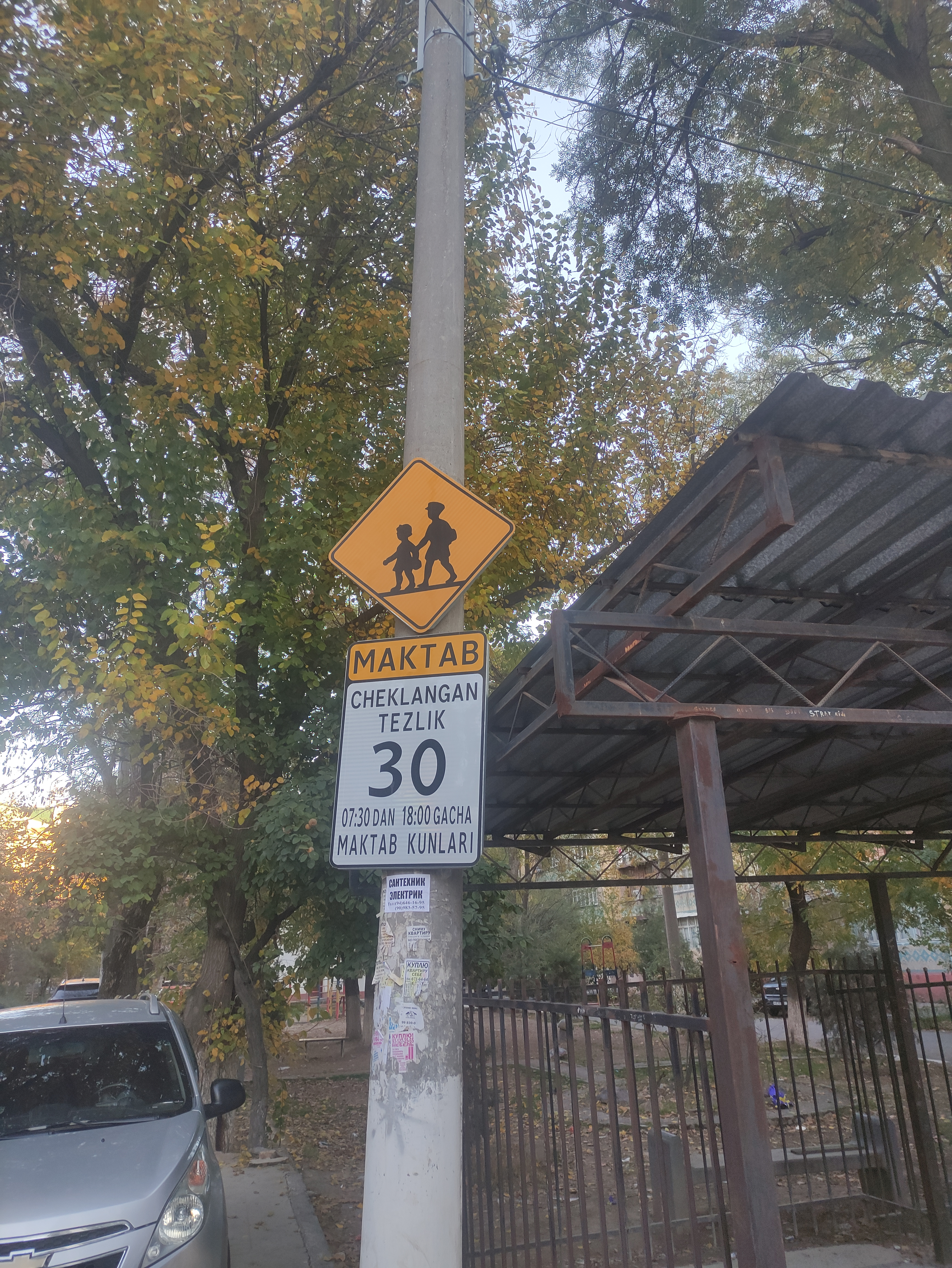
Road signs in Tashkent

Road signs in Uzbekistan are regulated by the O'zDst 3283-2017 standard. Due to the country being a former Soviet Socialist Republic, road signs are similar in design to those used in the Soviet Union before its dissolution in 1991, as well as in most other post-Soviet states. Uzbekistan acceded to the Vienna Convention on Road Signs and Signals on January 17, 1995.

Modern road signs in Uzbekistan are in many ways similar in design to road signs used in Russia and are based on the Soviet GOST 10807-78 standard and the Russian GOST R 52290-2004 standard. The GOST 10807-78 standard is still valid in Uzbekistan, but with additions. However, modern road signs in Uzbekistan also have some design features used on road signs in European countries such as Spain, Germany and Italy.

Inscriptions on road signs in Uzbekistan are written in the Uzbek language in Latin script only, despite the use of both Cyrillic and Latin alphabets in the country.

== Warning signs ==
1.1 Railway crossing with a barrier

1.2 Railway crossing without a barrier

1.3.1 Single-track railway

1.3.2 Multi-track railway

1.4.1 Approaching a railway crossing

1.4.2 Approaching a railway crossing

1.4.3 Approaching a railway crossing

1.4.4 Approaching a railway crossing

1.4.5 Approaching a railway crossing

1.4.6 Approaching a railway crossing

1.5 Trams

1.6 Intersection of equivalent roads

1.7 Roundabout

1.8 Traffic signals

1.9 Swing bridge

1.10 Departure to the embankment

1.11.1 Dangerous curve to the right

1.11.2 Dangerous curve to the left

1.12.1 Dangerous curves

1.12.2 Dangerous curves

1.13 Steep descent

1.14 Steep climb

1.15 Slippery road

1.16 Uneven road

1.17 Gravel surface

1.18.1 Road narrows on both sides

1.18.2 Road narrows on the right

1.18.3 Road narrows on the left

1.19.1 Two-way traffic

1.20 Pedestrian crossing ahead

1.21 Children

1.22 Intersection with a bike path or bike and pedestrian path

1.23 Roadworks

1.24 Cattle

1.25.1 Deer

1.25.2 Birds flying low

1.25.3 Rodents and reptiles

1.26 Falling rocks surface

1.27 Side winds

1.28 Low-flying aircraft

1.29 Accident danger zone

1.30 Other hazards

1.31 Speed bump

1.31.1 Hazard chevron

1.31.2 Hazard chevron

1.31.3 Hazard chevron

1.34 Attention, the device blocking the railway crossing

1.35 Pedestrians on the road

== Priority signs ==
2.1 Priority road

2.2 End of priority road

2.3.1 Intersection with a secondary road

2.3.2 Secondary road junction

2.3.3 Secondary road junction

2.3.4 Secondary road junction

2.3.5 Secondary road junction

2.3.6 Secondary road junction

2.3.7 Secondary road junction

2.4 Give way

2.5 Stop sign

2.6 Give way to oncoming traffic

2.7 Priority over oncoming traffic

== Prohibitory signs ==
3.1 Entry is prohibited

3.2 Traffic is prohibited

3.3 The movement of motor vehicles is prohibited

3.4 Lorries exceeding indicated weight prohibited

3.5 The movement of motorcycles is prohibited

3.6 The movement of tractors is prohibited

3.7 Driving with a trailer is prohibited

3.8 The movement of horse-drawn carts is prohibited

3.9 Cycling is prohibited

3.10 Pedestrian traffic is prohibited

3.11 Vehicle weight limit

3.12 Limitation of the mass per axle of the vehicle

3.13 Height limit

3.14 Width limit

3.15 Length limit

3.16 Limitation of the minimum distance

3.17.1 Customs

3.17.2 Danger

3.17.3 Control

3.18.1 Turning to the right is prohibited

3.18.2 Turning to the left is prohibited

3.19 U-turn is prohibited

3.20 Overtaking is prohibited

3.21 End of overtaking prohibition zone

3.22 Overtaking by trucks is prohibited

3.23 End of the zone prohibiting overtaking RU trucks

3.24 Maximum speed limit

3.25 End of the maximum speed limit zone

3.26 Beeping is prohibited

3.27 Stopping is prohibited

3.28 Parking is prohibited

3.29 Parking is prohibited on odd days of the month

3.30 Parking is prohibited on even days of the month

3.31 End of all restrictions zone

3.32 The movement of vehicles with dangerous goods is prohibited

3.33 No vehicles with explosive and flammable loads

== Mandatory signs ==
4.1.1 Driving straight

4.1.2 Turn right

4.1.3 Turn left

4.1.4 Proceed straight or turn right

4.1.5 Proceed straight or turn left

4.1.6 Turn right or left

4.2.1 Keep right

4.2.2 Keep left

4.2.3 Keep right or left

4.3 Direction of roundabout traffic

4.4 Passenger car traffic

4.5 Bicycle path

4.6 Footpath

4.6.1 Cyclist and pedestrians combined path

4.6.2 Cyclist and pedestrians combined path ends

4.6.3 Cyclist and pedestrians segregated path

4.6.4 Cyclist and pedestrians segregated path ends

4.6.5 Cyclist and pedestrians segregated path

4.6.6 Cyclist and pedestrians segregated path ends

4.7 Minimum speed limit

4.8 End of the minimum speed limit zone

4.9.1 Direction of movement of vehicles with dangerous goods (turn left)

4.9.2 Direction of movement of vehicles with dangerous goods (proceed straight)

4.9.3 Direction of movement of vehicles with dangerous goods (turn right)

== Information signs ==
5.1 Motorway

5.2 End of the motorway

5.3 Road for cars

5.4 End of the road for cars

5.5 One-way road

5.6 End of one-way road

5.7.1 Exit to a one-way road

5.7.2 Exit to a one-way road

5.8.1 Lane directions

5.8.2 Lane directions

5.8.2 Lane directions

5.8.2 Lane directions

5.8.2 Lane directions

5.8.2 Lane directions

5.8.2 Lane directions

5.8.2 Lane directions

5.8.3 The beginning of the lane

5.8.3 The beginning of the lane

5.8.4 The beginning of the lane

5.8.5 End of the lane

5.8.6 End of the lane

5.8.7 Lane direction

5.8.7 Lane direction

5.8.8 Lane direction

5.8.8 Lane direction

5.9 Bus lane

5.10.1 A road with a line for fixed-route vehicles

5.10.2 End of the road with a lane for fixed-route vehicles

5.10.3 Exit to the road with a lane for fixed-route vehicles

5.11.1 U-turn

5.11.2 U-turn zone

5.12 Bus and/or trolleybus stop location

5.13 Tram stop location

5.14 Taxi stop

5.15 Parking

5.15.1 Paid parking

5.15.2 Above-ground parking lot

5.15.3 Underground parking lot

5.15.4 Electric car parking space

5.16.1 Pedestrian crossing

5.16.2 Pedestrian crossing

5.17.1 Subway (underpass)

5.17.2 Subway (underpass)

5.17.3 Footbridge

5.17.4 Footbridge

5.18 Recommended speed

5.19.1 Dead end

5.19.2 Dead end

5.19.3 Dead end

5.19.4 Dead end

5.20.1 A preliminary sign of directions

5.20.1 A preliminary sign of directions

5.20.1 A preliminary sign of directions

5.20.2 A preliminary sign of direction

5.20.3 Traffic scheme

5.20.4 Direction indicator for turning or reversing on sections of roads that do not intersect at the same level

5.20.4 Direction indicator for turning or reversing on sections of roads that do not intersect at the same level

5.20.4 Direction indicator for turning or reversing on sections of roads that do not intersect at the same level

5.21.1 Pointing direction

5.21.2 Pointing direction

5.22 Entrance to built-up area

5.23 End of built-up area

5.24 Entrance to locality

5.25 End of locality

5.26 Object name (river name)

5.26 Object name (street name)

5.27 Distance indicator

5.28 Kilometer sign

5.29.1 Route number

5.29.1 Route number

5.29.2 Route number and direction

5.29.2 Route number and direction

5.29.2 Route number and direction

5.30.1 Direction of movement for trucks

5.30.2 Direction of movement for trucks

5.30.3 Direction of movement for trucks

5.31 Detour scheme

5.32.1 Detour direction

5.32.2 Detour direction

5.32.3 Detour direction

5.33 Stop line

5.34.1 Preliminary indicator for changing lanes onto another roadway

5.34.2 Preliminary indicator for changing lanes onto another roadway

5.35 Reversible lane

5.36 End of reversible lane

5.37 Exit to the road with reversible lane

5.38 Residential area

5.39 End of residential area

5.40 Emergency stopping

5.41 Photo- and video traffic control

5.42 Turn right on red light

5.43 Radar

5.46 Children

5.47.1 Tourist attractions

5.47.2 Tourism information center

== Service signs ==
6.1 Point of medical care

6.2 Hospital

6.3.1 Fuel station

6.3.2 Fuel station (LNG only)

6.3.3 Charging station

6.4 Vehicle maintenance

6.5 Car washing

6.6 Phone

6.7 Food point

6.8 Drinking water

6.9 Hotel or motel

6.10 Camping

6.11 Place of rest

6.12 Traffic police

6.13 International road transport control

6.14 Toilet

6.15 Waste collection point

6.16 Pool or beach

6.17 Department of Internal Affairs

6.18 Road information radio

6.19 Mosque

6.20 Church

6.21 Temple

6.22 Train station

6.23 Airport

6.24 Market

6.25 Tourism information centre

6.26 Reserve

6.27 Picturesque place

6.28 Architectural monument

== Additional panels ==
7.1.1 Distance to the object

7.1.2 Stop ahead with distance

7.1.3 Distance to the object on the right

7.1.4 Distance to the object on the left

7.2.1 Coverage area

7.2.2 Coverage area

7.2.3 Coverage area

7.2.4 Coverage area

7.2.5 Coverage area on the right

7.2.6 Coverage area on the left

7.3.1 Directions of action

7.3.2 Directions of action

7.3.3 Directions of action

7.4.1 Trucks only

7.4.2 Trailers only

7.4.3 Cars only

7.4.4 Buses only

7.4.5 Tractors only

7.4.6 Motorcycles only

7.4.7 Bicycles only

7.4.8 Dangerous goods vehicles only

7.5.1 Saturdays, Sundays and holidays

7.5.2 Working days

7.5.3 Days of the week

7.5.4 Validity period

7.5.5 Validity period

7.5.6 Validity period

7.5.7 Validity period

7.6.1 Method of parking the vehicle

7.6.2 Method of parking the vehicle

7.6.3 Method of parking the vehicle

7.6.4 Method of parking the vehicle

7.6.5 Method of parking the vehicle

7.7 A place to park without using the engine

7.8 Paid services

7.9 Limitation of parking duration

7.10 Place for car inspection

7.11 Limitation of the permitted maximum mass

7.12 Dangerous roadside

7.13 Direction of the main road

7.14 Traffic lane

7.15 Blind pedestrians

7.16 Wet coating

7.17 Disabled people

7.18 Except for disabled people

7.19 Photo- and video traffic control

7.20 Dangerous goods category

7.23 Zipper merge

7.23 Zipper merge

7.23 Zipper merge

== Temporary signs ==
Temporary warning, priority and prohibition signs differ from permanent ones in that they have a yellow background instead of white.

1.15 Slippery road

1.17 Gravel surface

1.18.1 Road narrows on both sides

1.18.2 Road narrows on the right

1.18.3 Road narrows on the left

1.23 Roadworks

1.31 Speed bump

2.6 Give way to oncoming traffic

3.12 Limitation of the mass per axle of the vehicle

3.20 Overtaking is prohibited

3.24 Maximum speed limit
