= Road signs in Lithuania =

Prohibitory road sign in Nida

Road signs in Lithuania conform to the general pattern of those used in most other European countries as set out in the 1968 Vienna Convention on Road Signs and Signals.

== History ==
The first road signs were introduced in Lithuania on 1 October 1930, after President Antanas Smetona signed the 1926 International Convention relative to Motor Traffic. In 1932, a set of road signs were legally defined by a new government regulation. In 1940, after the Soviet occupation of Lithuania, the Soviet road traffic rules and road signs were adopted in Lithuania (the USSR itself adopted them in 1937). On 1 January 1980, the standard GOST 10807-78 was adopted in the Soviet Union, including in the territory of the present day Lithuania. In 1990, after Lithuania restored its independence, the road sign design remained generally unchanged.

Lithuanian road sign design saw minor changes in 2014. Some of the warning signs design were changed, a few new signs were added, like the sign indicating speed bump (formerly uneven road sign was used for indicating speed bumps), or sign indicating emergency stopping lane. However, Lithuania also adopted the use of both a blue and green background on the "Motorway" road sign. In the past, Lithuania used only the green background on the "Motorway" road sign, which is still used by the former Soviet states. Also, some new road signs were created over the time.

Due to the fact that modern road signs in Lithuania are very similar in design to Soviet signs, including modern Russian, Belarusian, Ukrainian, and Moldovan signs, there have been proposals to change the design of road signs used in Lithuania. In 2020, Seimas member Kęstutis Masiulis complained to the Minister of Transportation Jaroslavas Narkevičius and proposed to change the design of road signs.

In March 2022, after the Russian invasion of Ukraine started, two road signs were installed in the Liepkalnis area of Vilnius, indicating distances to the Ukrainian and Belarusian capitals, Kyiv and Minsk, respectively. The Ukrainian flag is displayed at the bottom of the sign indicating the distance to Kyiv on the left, while "OCCUPIED BY KREMLIN" is written at the bottom of the sign indicating the distance to Minsk on the right.

On 2 April 2024, members of the parliament Andrius Vyšniauskas, Paulė Kuzmickienė and Mindaugas Skritulskas appealed to the Minister of Transport, proposing to change the design of road signs, because in their opinion, the design of road signs used in Lithuania is similar to the signs used during the Soviet occupation. However, the Ministry of Transport and Communications stated that there is no sufficient legal basis to change the design of road signs following the example of other countries. The ministry also emphasized that installing one standard road sign costs an average of €200.

== Design ==
The official typeface used on road signs in Lithuania remains based on the Soviet standard GOST 10807-78.

== Warning signs ==
Level crossing ahead, with gates

Level crossing ahead, without gates

Swing bridge

Unprotected quayside or riverbank

Children

Roadworks

Crossroads without priority (give way to the vehicles coming from the right)

Junction with minor road
(also used)

Junction with minor road (from the right)
(also used)

Junction with minor road (from the left)
(also used)

Roundabout

Traffic signals

Dangerous curve to the right
(also used)

Dangerous curve to the left
(also used)

Double curve, first to the right
(also used)

Double curve, first to the left
(also used)

Steep descent

Steep ascent

Slippery road

Uneven road or series of bumps ahead

Gravel loose

Dangerous shoulder

Road narrows on both sides

Road narrows on right side

Road narrows on left side

End of one-way traffic

Pedestrian crossing

Pedestrians

Cyclists

Cattle crossing

Wildlife crossing

Falling rocks

Crosswinds

Low-flying aircraft

Traffic jams

Accidents area

Other dangers

Level crossing (single track)

Level crossing (multiple tracks)

Level crossing countdown

Level crossing countdown

Level crossing countdown

Level crossing countdown

Level crossing countdown

Level crossing countdown

Hazard chevron (right)

Hazard chevron (right)

Hazard chevron (left)

Hazard chevron (left)

Hazard chevron (both)

Obstacle detour

Ruts ahead

Speed bump

Equestrians

Obstacle (right)
(used with)

Obstacle (left)
(used with)

Obstacle (to either side)
(used with)

== Priority signs ==
Priority road

End of priority road

Give way

Stop

Give priority to oncoming traffic

Priority over oncoming traffic

== Prohibitory signs ==
Do not enter

Closed to all vehicles in both directions

No motor vehicles except motorcycles

No trucks

No entry for motorcycles

No tractors

No trailers

No animal-drawn vehicles

No bicycles

No pedestrians

No vehicles carrying dangerous goods

No power-driven vehicles

No power-driven or animal-drawn vehicles

Mass limit

Total mass limit

Height limit

Width limit

Length limit

Minimum separation

Passing without stopping prohibited

Passing without stopping prohibited

Passing without controlling prohibited

No right turn

No left turn

No U-turn

No overtaking

End of overtaking prohibition

No overtaking by trucks

End of overtaking prohibition by trucks

50 km/h maximum speed limit

End of 50 km/h speed limit

No audible warning devices

No stopping

No parking

Alternate parking on odd days

Alternate parking on even days

End of all prohibitions

No mopeds

No vehicles carrying explosive or readily inflammable substances

No vehicles carrying substance liable to cause water pollution

No motorized scooters

No residential vehicles

== Mandatory signs ==
Proceed straight

Turn right

Turn left

Straight ahead or right turn permitted

Straight ahead or left turn permitted

Turn left or right

Keep right

Keep left

Keep left or right

Roundabout

Roundabout (alt)

Cycle path

Pedestrian path

Shared cyclist and pedestrian path

Segregated cyclist and pedestrian path

Segregated cyclist and pedestrian path

70 km/h minimum speed limit

End of 70 km/h minimum speed limit

Proceed straight for vehicles carrying dangerous goods

Proceed to the right for vehicles carrying dangerous goods

Proceed to the left for vehicles carrying dangerous goods

== Indicative signs ==
Motorway

End of motorway

One-way street

End of one-way street

One-way street to the right

One-way street to the left

Traffic directions at the intersection

The direction of traffic at the intersection is straight

The direction of traffic at the intersection is to the right

The direction of traffic at the intersection is to the left

The direction of traffic at the intersection is straight and right

The direction of traffic at the intersection is straight and left

Added lane from right

Added lane from left

End of the right lane

End of the left lane

Traffic directions in traffic lanes

Traffic directions in traffic lanes

Traffic directions in traffic lanes

Traffic in lanes

Lane start and limits

Added lane from junction

Added lane from junction

Lane reserved for buses

Lane reserved for buses

Entrance to the road with a lane for buses

Entrance to the road with a lane for buses

U-turn

Parking

Parking on limited duration only

Parking on time period only

Reserved parking only

Parking of bus vehicle

Pedestrian crossing

Pedestrian crossing

Pedestrian crossing (with fluoro board)

Pedestrian crossing (with fluoro board)

Underground pedestrian crossing

Underground pedestrian crossing

Footbridge

Footbridge

Advisory speed

No parking zone

Parking zone

Speed limit zone

End of no parking zone

End of parking zone

End of speed limit zone

Start of tunnel

End of tunnel

Bus stop

Taxi stop

Start of city limit

Start of city limit

Start of city limit

End of city limit

End of city limit

Residential area

End of city limit

End of residential area

Stop-line

Expressway

End of expressway

Safety island

Emergency stopping lane

Bicycle street

End of bicycle street

== Information signs ==
Advance direction indicator

Advance direction indicator

Advance direction indicator

Advance direction indicator

Advance direction indicator

Advance direction indicator

Indication of direction

Indication of direction

Indication of direction

Indication of direction

Driving scheme

Driving direction for trucks

Dead end

Start of city

End of city

River name

County name

Street name

Street name

Distance index

General speed limits

Kilometer sign

Kilometer sign

International Road number

County Road number

Motorway number

Number and direction of the road

Number and direction of the road

Number and direction of the road

Number and direction of the road or cycle track

Number and direction of cycle track

Circuit diagram

Detour direction

Detour direction

Reordering arrow

Directional arrow to point of interest

Name of the place to visit

Direction pointer to national, regional parks, state nature reserves, state nature and complex reserves

Beginning of a national, regional park, state nature reserve, state natural or complex reserve

End of national, regional park, state nature reserve, state natural or complex reserve

Direction to historical national, historical regional parks, state cultural reserves, museums

Name of historical national, historical regional park, state cultural reserve, museum

Republic of Lithuania EU sign

Automatic traffic control

Automatic traffic control

== Service signs ==
First aid post

Hospital

Filling station

Breakdown service

Car washing

Public telephone

Restaurant

Refreshment

Hotel

Camping site

Caravan site

Caravan and camping site

Picnic site

Police station

Public lavatory

Swimming pool

Drinking water

Customs area

Airport

Information zone

Youth hostel

Rural tourism homestead

National historic/cultural/tourist site

Fishing

Golf sport

Equestrian sport

Ski lift

Bus station

Train station

Vehicle ferry

Registry of vehicles or drivers

Technical inspection station

Electric car charging place

Industrial zone

== Additional panels ==
Distance

Side extension (of no stopping or no parking)

Side extension (of no stopping or no parking)

Stop ahead

Length

Beginning (of no stopping or no parking)

Continuation (of no stopping or no parking)

Ending (of no stopping or no parking)

Validity area to the right

Validity area to the left

Validity area in both directions

Direction of validity to the right

Direction of validity to the left

Direction of validity in both directions

Type of vehicle: Trucks

Type of vehicle: Vehicles with trailers

Type of vehicle: Cars

Type of vehicle: Buses

Type of vehicles: Tractors

Type of vehicles: Motorcycles

Type of vehicles: Cycles

Saturdays, sundays and holidays

Working days

Days of the week

Day of the week

Time period

Time period during saturdays, sundays and holidays

Time period during working days

Time period during days of the week

Parking method of vehicle

Parking method of vehicle

Parking method of vehicle

Parking method of vehicle

Parking method of vehicle

Parking method of vehicle

Parking method of vehicle

Parking method of vehicle

Parking method of vehicle

Parking of no working engine only

Payment services

Payment services during saturdays, sundays and holidays, working days, days of the week and time period

Dangerous roadside

Direction of priority road

Direction of priority road

Blind pedestrians

Wet coating

Disabled parking

Except for the disabled

Ice or snow

Compressed natural gas

Compressed natural gas

Liquified petroleum gas

Liquified petroleum gas

Types of fuel

Type of vehicle: Mopeds

Except for cycles

Type of vehicle: Electric cars

Except for electric cars

Bicycle traffic

Type of vehicle: Residential vehicles

== Historic signs ==
=== 1938 road signs ===
Uneven road

Series of bends

Crossroad

Level crossing with barriers

Level crossing without barriers

Danger

Yield

No vehicles

Do not enter

No motor vehicles with more than three wheels

No motorcycles

No motor vehicles

Weight limit

Weight limit for motor vehicles

Speed limit

No stopping

No parking

Mandatory direction

Customs

Parking

Caution recommended

First aid
