= Road signs in Belarus =

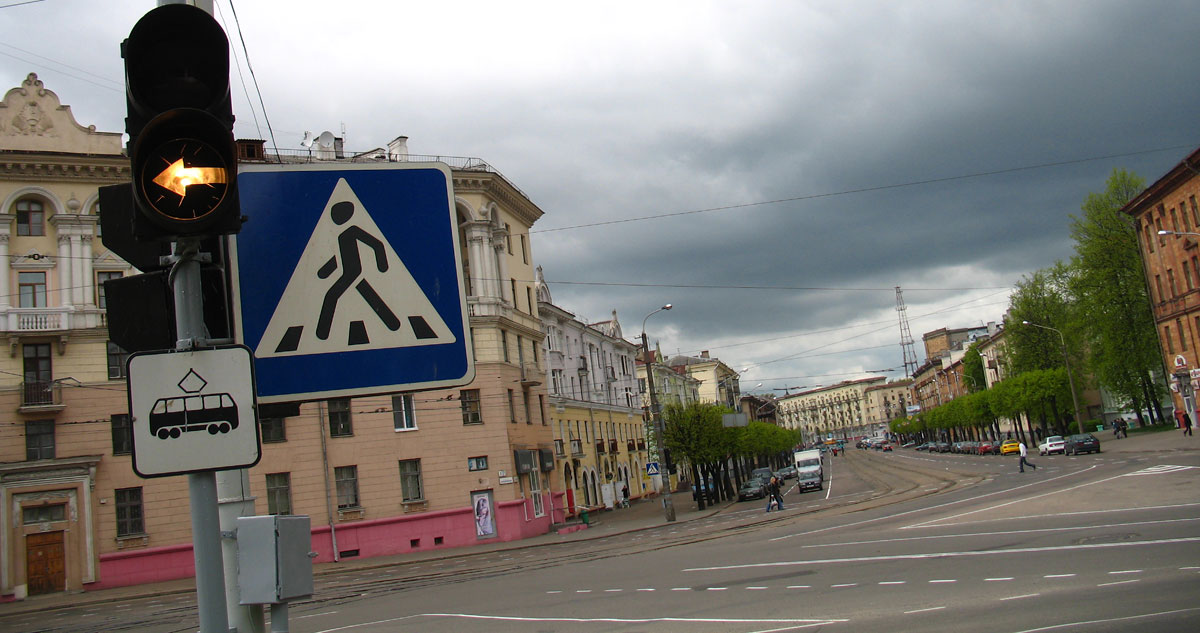
Pedestrian crossing sign in Minsk.

Road signs in Belarus are regulated by the road sign standard STB 1140-2013. Due to the country being a former Soviet Socialist Republic between 1920 and 1991, road signs are similar in design to those used in the Soviet Union before its dissolution in 1991, as well as in most other post-Soviet states, especially neighboring Russia, Ukraine, and Lithuania. Like Russia and Ukraine, Belarus is a signatory to the Vienna Convention on Road Traffic and the Vienna Convention on Road Signs and Signals. Belarus signed the Vienna Convention on 8 November 1968 and ratified it on 18 June 1974, when the country was a Soviet Socialist Republic. The Soviet Union itself was once a signatory to the Vienna Convention on Road Signs and Signals.

== Design ==
Although road signs in Belarus are visually similar in design to modern road signs used in neighboring Russia and the STB 1140-2013 standard serves a similar role to the Russian standard GOST R 52290-2004, the Belarusian standard has developed independently and has many differences from its Russian counterpart.

Inscriptions on road signs are written in Belarusian or Russian, including the names of settlements, most often in Belarusian. The use of the Belarusian language on road signs in Belarus is more preferable according to the Belarusian standard. Despite this, in 2015 there was a case where road signs in Russian instead of Belarusian were installed in Mogilev. The official typeface of Belarusian road signs is based on the Soviet standard GOST 10807-78. However, Arial may also be seen on Belarusian road signs instead.

=== Graphic differences from Russian signs ===
- Signs with route numbers can be on a blue, green, red and white background (signs on a white background have a route number written in red, and arrows in red), while in Russia the background on route signs is only blue and green. Like most European countries, Belarus uses the European route signs on a green background, while Russia also uses a green background for motorway numbers, in particular the M11 Neva motorway between Moscow and St. Petersburg.
- The word STOP on the "stop line" sign is written in Latin script but not СТОП in Cyrillic as in Russia, despite the fact that the Cyrillic script is used in Belarus' official languages.
- Unlike Russia, the "direction of lanes sign" indicates the direction of movement for only two or three lanes. Since roads can have 4 or more lanes, two signs are installed to the right and left of the carriageway.
- Unlike Russia, Belarus does not use the Speed bump special regulation sign, using a warning one instead. This is because this road sign was introduced in Russia in the ГОСТ Р 52290-2004 standard under the number 5.20. This sign is also not found in neighboring Ukraine. Despite this, a bump indication road sign in this form is found in some European countries.
- First aid and hospital signs use a green cross instead of a red one, unlike most other post-Soviet states and European countries.

== Warning signs ==
1.1 Railway crossing with a barrier

1.2 Railway crossing without a barrier

1.3.1 Single-track railway

1.3.2 Multi-track railway

1.4.1 Approaching a railway crossing

1.4.2 Approaching a railway crossing

1.4.3 Approaching a railway crossing

1.4.4 Approaching a railway crossing

1.4.5 Approaching a railway crossing

1.4.6 Approaching a railway crossing

1.5 Trams

1.6 End of paved road

1.7 Roundabout

1.8 Traffic signals

1.9 Opening bridge

1.10 Departure to the embankment

1.11.1 Dangerous curve

1.11.2 Dangerous curve

1.12.1 Dangerous curves

1.12.2 Dangerous curves

1.13 Steep descent

1.14 Steep climb

1.15 Slippery road

1.16.2 Uneven road

1.16.3 Road for bump

1.16.4 Road for bump (temporary)

1.16.5 Dip

1.17 Gravel surface

1.18.1 Road narrows on both sides

1.18.2 Road narrows on the right

1.18.3 Road narrows on the left

1.18.4 Road narrows on both sides (temporary)

1.18.5 Road narrows on the right (temporary)

1.18.6 Road narrows on the left (temporary)

1.19.1 Two-way traffic

1.19.2 Two-way traffic (temporary)

1.20 Pedestrian crossing ahead (also uses)

1.21 Children (also uses)

1.22 Intersection with a bike path or bike and pedestrian path

1.23 Roadworks (also uses)

1.24 Cattle ahead

1.25 Deer ahead

1.26 Falling rocks surface

1.27 Side wind

1.28 Low-flying aircraft

1.29 Accident danger zone

1.30 Other dangers

1.31.1 Hazard chevron

1.31.2 Hazard chevron

1.31.3 Hazard chevron

1.31.4 Hazard chevron

1.31.5 Hazard chevron

1.32 Dangerous roadside

1.33 Ice on road

1.34 Congestion

1.35 Seasonal migrations of amphibians

1.36 Driving mode control

== Priority signs ==
2.1 Priority road

2.2 End of priority road

2.3.1 Intersection with a secondary road

2.3.2 Secondary road junction

2.3.3 Secondary road junction

2.3.4 Crossroads

2.4 Give way

2.5 Stop

2.6.1 Give way to oncoming traffic

2.6.2 Give way to oncoming traffic (temporary)

2.7 Priority over oncoming traffic

== Prohibitory signs ==
3.1 Entry is prohibited

3.2 Traffic is prohibited

3.3 The movement of motor vehicles is prohibited

3.4 Lorries exceeding indicated weight prohibited

3.5 The movement of motorcycles is prohibited

3.6 The movement of tractors is prohibited

3.7 Driving with a trailer is prohibited

3.8 The movement of horse-drawn carts is prohibited

3.9 Cycling is prohibited

3.10 Pedestrian traffic is prohibited (also uses)

3.11.1 Vehicle weight limit

3.11.2 Vehicle weight limit (temporary)

3.12.1 Limitation of the mass per axle of the vehicle

3.12.2 Limitation of the mass per axle of the vehicle (temporary)

3.13 Height limit

3.14 Width limit

3.15.1 Length limit

3.15.2 Length limit (temporary)

3.16 Limitation of the minimum distance

3.17.1 Customs

3.17.2 Danger

3.18.1 Turning to the right is prohibited

3.18.2 Turning to the left is prohibited

3.19 U-turn is prohibited

3.20.1 Overtaking is prohibited

3.20.2 Overtaking is prohibited (temporary)

3.20.3 Overtaking is prohibited (overtaking vehicles, the speed of which is more than indicated on the sign, is prohibited)

3.21.1 End of overtaking prohibition zone

3.21.2 End of overtaking prohibition zone (temporary)

3.22 Overtaking by trucks is prohibited

3.23 End of the zone prohibiting overtaking by trucks

3.24.1 Maximum speed limit

3.24.2 Maximum speed limit (temporary)

3.25.1 End of the maximum speed limit zone

3.25.2 End of the maximum speed limit zone (temporary)

3.26 Beeping is prohibited

3.27 Stopping is prohibited

3.28 Parking is prohibited

3.29 Parking is prohibited on odd days of the month

3.30 Parking is prohibited on even days of the month

3.31 End of all restrictions zone

3.32 The movement of vehicles with dangerous goods is prohibited

== Mandatory signs ==
4.1.1 Driving straight

4.1.2 Turn right

4.1.3 Turn left

4.1.4 Proceed straight or turn right

4.1.5 Proceed straight or turn left

4.1.6 Turn right or left

4.2.1 Keep right

4.2.2 Keep left

4.2.3 Keep right or left

4.3 Direction of roundabout traffic

4.4 Passenger car traffic

4.5.1 Bicycle path

4.5.2 End of bicycle path

4.6.1 Footpath (also uses)

4.6.2 End of footpath (also uses)

4.7 Minimum speed limit

4.8 End of the minimum speed limit zone

4.9.1 Direction of movement of vehicles with dangerous goods (turn left)

4.9.2 Direction of movement of vehicles with dangerous goods (proceed straight)

4.9.3 Direction of movement of vehicles with dangerous goods (turn right)

4.10.1 Rider path

4.10.2 End of rider path

== Information signs ==
5.1 Motorway

5.2 End of the motorway

5.3 Road for cars

5.4 End of the road for cars

5.5 One-way road

5.6 End of one-way road

5.7.1 Exit to a one-way road

5.7.2 Exit to a one-way road

5.8.1 Lane directions

5.8.2 Lane directions

5.8.2 Lane directions

5.8.2 Lane directions

5.8.2 Lane directions

5.8.2 Lane directions

5.8.2 Lane directions

5.8.2 Lane directions

5.8.3 The beginning of the lane

5.8.3 The beginning of the lane

5.8.4 The beginning of the lane

5.8.5 End of the lane

5.8.6 End of the lane

5.8.7 Lane direction

5.8.8 Lane direction

5.8.8 Lane direction

5.9.1 Bus lane

5.9.2 End of bus lane

5.10.1 A road with a line for fixed-route vehicles

5.10.2 End of the road with a lane for fixed-route vehicles

5.10.3 Exit to the road with a lane for fixed-route vehicles

5.10.4 Exit to the road with a lane for fixed-route vehicles

5.11.1 U-turn

5.11.2 U-turn

5.12.1 Bus and/or trolleybus stop location

5.12.2 Bus and (or) trolley bus stop

5.13 Tram stop location

5.14.1 Express route stop

5.14.2 Parking place for passenger taxis

5.15 Parking

5.16.1 Pedestrian crossing (also uses)

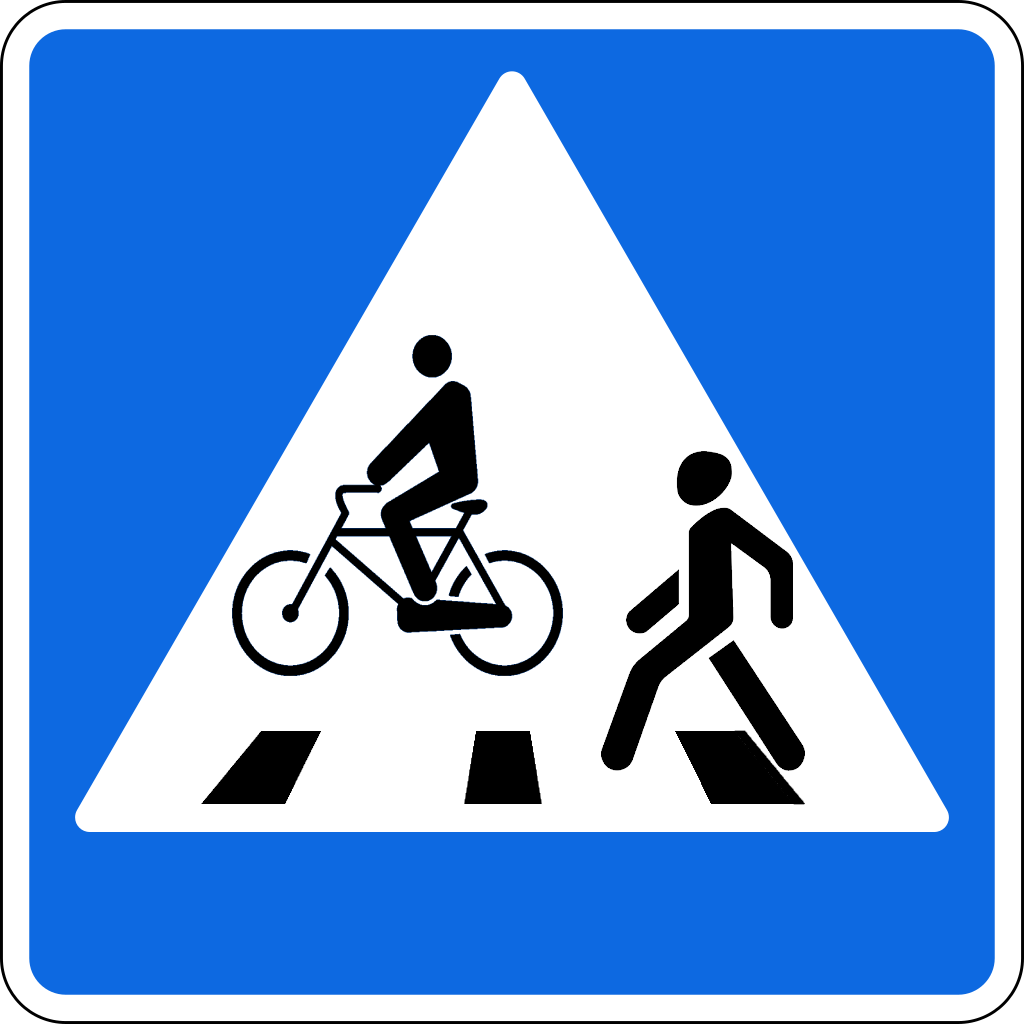
5.16.2 Pedestrian and cyclists crossing

5.16.3 Pedestrian crossing (also uses)

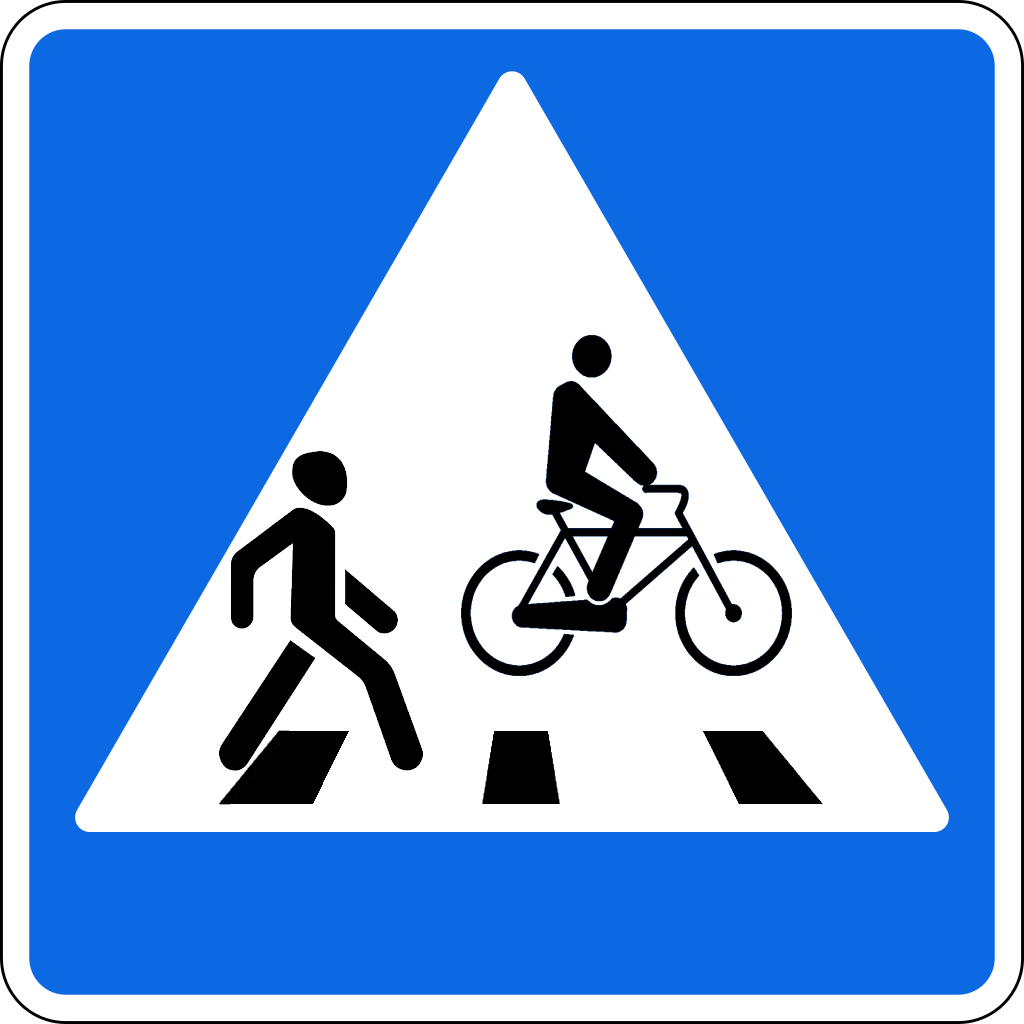
5.16.4 Pedestrian and cyclists crossing

5.17.1 Subway (underpass) (also uses)

5.17.2 Subway (underpass) (also uses)

5.17.3 Footbridge (also uses)

5.17.4 Footbridge (also uses)

5.18.1 Recommended speed

5.18.2 End of recommended speed zone

5.19.1 Dead end

5.19.2 Dead end

5.19.3 Dead end

5.20.1 A preliminary sign of directions

5.20.1 A preliminary sign of directions

5.20.1 A preliminary sign of directions

5.20.1 A preliminary sign of directions

5.20.2 A preliminary sign of direction

5.20.2 A preliminary sign of direction

5.20.3 Traffic scheme

5.21.1 Pointing direction

5.21.1 Pointing direction

5.21.1 Pointing direction

5.21.2 Pointing directions

5.22.1 Entrance to built-up area

5.22.2 Entrance to built-up area

5.23.1 End of built-up area

5.23.2 End of built-up area

5.24 Entrance to locality

5.25 End of locality

5.26.1 Object name (river name)

5.26.2 Object name (street name)

5.27.1 Distance indicator

5.27.2 Distance indicator

5.28 Kilometer sign

5.28 Kilometer sign

5.29.1 Route number (European route number)

5.29.1 Route number (Highway or state roads)

5.29.1 Route number (Regional roads)

5.30.1 Direction of movement for trucks

5.30.2 Direction of movement for trucks

5.30.3 Direction of movement for trucks

5.31 Detour scheme

5.32.1 Detour direction

5.32.2 Detour direction

5.32.3 Detour direction

5.33 Stop line

5.34.1 Preliminary index of the lane change to another carriageway

5.34.2 Preliminary index of the lane change to another carriageway

5.35 Reversible lane

5.36 End of reversible lane

5.37 Entrance to a road with reversible lane

5.38 Residential area (also uses)

5.39 End of residential area (also uses)

5.40 Pedestrian zone (also uses)

5.41 End of pedestrian zone (also uses)

5.42 Toll road

5.43 End of toll road

5.4.4 Directions to the toll collection

== Service signs ==
6.1 Point of medical care

6.2 Hospital

6.3.1 Gas station

6.3.2 Gas station

6.3.3 Gas station

6.3.4 Charging station

6.3.5 Gas station combined with a charging station

6.3.6 Gas station combined with a charging station

6.3.7 Gas station combined with a charging station

6.4 Vehicle maintenance

6.5 Car washing

6.6 Phone

6.7 Food point

6.8 Drinking water

6.9 Hotel or motel

6.10 Camping

6.11 Place of rest

6.12.1 Militia

6.12.2 Traffic police post

6.13 Toilet

6.14 Transport control point

6.15 Landmark

== Additional plates ==
7.1.1 Distance to the object

7.1.2 Distance to the object

7.1.3 Distance to the object

7.1.4 Distance to the object

7.2.1 Coverage area

7.2.2 Coverage area

7.2.3 Coverage area

7.2.4 Coverage area

7.2.5 Coverage area

7.2.6 Coverage area

7.3.1 Directions of action

7.3.2 Directions of action

7.3.3 Directions of action

7.4.1 Type of vehicle

7.4.2 Type of vehicle

7.4.3 Type of vehicle

7.4.4 Type of vehicle

7.4.5 Type of vehicle

7.4.6 Type of vehicle

7.4.7 Type of vehicle

7.4.8 Type of vehicle

7.5.1 Saturdays, Sundays and holidays

7.5.2 Working days

7.5.3 Days of the week

7.5.4 Validity period

7.5.5 Validity period

7.5.6 Validity period

7.5.7 Validity period

7.6.1 Method of parking the vehicle

7.6.2 Method of parking the vehicle

7.6.3 Method of parking the vehicle

7.6.4 Method of parking the vehicle

7.6.5 Method of parking the vehicle

7.6.6 Method of parking the vehicle

7.6.7 Method of parking the vehicle

7.6.8 Method of parking the vehicle

7.6.9 Method of parking the vehicle

7.7 Number of dangerous turns

7.8 Paid services

7.9 Limitation of parking duration

7.10 Place for car inspection

7.11 Limitation of the permitted maximum mass

7.12 Road marking

7.13 Direction of the main road

7.14 Traffic lane

7.15 Blind pedestrians

7.16 Wet coating

7.17 Disabled people

7.18 Except for the disabled

7.19 Dangerous goods class

7.20 Tow truck

7.21 Slippery lane

7.22.1 Type of danger

7.22.2 Type of danger

7.22.3 Type of danger (also used )

7.22.4 Type of danger

7.23 Emergency help

7.24 Be an example to your child

7.25 Number of permitted parking spaces

== See also ==
- Comparison of European traffic laws
- Comparison of European road signs
- Traffic signs in post-Soviet states
- Traffic sign
- Vienna Convention on Road Signs and Signals
