= Road signs in Latvia =

Road signs at level crossing in Skulte.

Road signs in Latvia conform to the general pattern of those used in most other European countries. They are regulated in the Road Traffic Regulations (Latvian: Ceļu satiksmes noteikumi) as well as in the national road sign standards, in conformity with the 1968 Vienna Convention on Road Signs and Signals, to which Latvia acceded on October 19, 1992.

During the 1920s and 1930s, Latvia had developed various road signs but after Latvia was occupied and later annexed by the Soviet Union during the World War II, it used the Soviet road sign standard before adopting its own. In 1980, the standard for road signs GOST 10807-78 was adopted in the Soviet Union before its dissolution in 1991. After the restoration of the independence of Latvia in 1990, a new standard for road signs was developed, which has departed from the Soviet standard still in use elsewhere today. Latvian road signs use the DIN 1451 typeface.

The text used on signs is in the state language, Latvian. Recently, some signs have been introduced with Latvian supplemented by Livonian and Latgalian. In November 2021, the first standard-compliant road sign with Latgalian was placed on the border of Balvi Municipality, with others being gradually installed in other locations in Latgale. In January 2023, the first of 171 approved signs with Livonian text were placed on the border of Talsi Municipality, with others expected to be placed in villages along the Livonian Coast.

== Warning signs ==
Crossroads without priority (give way to the vehicles coming from the right)

Roundabout ahead

Dangerous curve to the right

Dangerous curve to the left

Double curve, first to the right

Double curve, first to the left

Road narrows on both sides

Road narrows on right side

Road narrows on left side

Steep descent

Steep ascent

Uneven road

Speed bumps

Changing the road surface

Slippery road

Loose chippings

Falling stones

Roadworks ahead

Dangerous shoulder

Pedestrian crossing

Children

Two-way traffic

Traffic signals ahead

Animals e.g for cattle

Animals e.g for deer

Swing bridge

Unproteceted quayside or riverbank ahead

Sidewinds

Low-flying aircraft

Cyclists

Tram Crossing

Level crossing ahead, with gates

Level crossing ahead, without gates

Level crossing (single track)

Level crossing (multiple tracks)

Level crossing countdown

Level crossing countdown

Level crossing countdown

Level crossing countdown

Level crossing countdown

Level crossing countdown

Dangerous road section

Traffic jams

Directional plate
(used with)

Directional plate
(used with)

Directional plate
(used with)

== Priority signs ==
Priority road

End of priority road

Junction with minor road

Junction with minor road (from the right)

Junction with minor road (from the left)

Give way

Stop

Give priority to oncoming traffic

Priority over oncoming traffic

== Prohibitory signs ==
No entry

Closed to all vehicles in both directions

No motor vehicles except motorcycles

No motorcycles

No bicycles

No trucks

No trailers

No tractors

No pedestrians

Width limit

Height limit

Mass limit

Mass limit per axle

Length limit

No right turn

No left turn

No U-turn

Minimum separation

No overtaking

End of overtaking prohibition

No overtaking by trucks

End of overtaking prohibition by trucks

Maximum speed limit

End of maximum speed limit

No audible warning devices

No stopping or standing

No parking or waiting

No parking on odd dates

No parking on even dates

End of all prohibitions

Customs

Police

Driving further is dangerous

No vehicles carrying dangerous goods

== Mandatory signs ==
Ahead only

Turn right

Turn left

Straight ahead or right turn permitted

Straight ahead or left turn permitted

Turn left or right

Turn right before sign

Turn left before sign

Roundabout

Pass side from right

Pass side from left

Pass either side

Cycle path

End of cycle path

Pedestrian path

End of pedestrian path

Cycle and pedestrian path

End of cycle and pedestrian path

Segregated cycle and pedestrian path

End of segregated cycle and pedestrian path

Cycle and pedestrian path

End of segregated cycle and pedestrian path

Minimum speed

End of minimum speed

Proceed straight for vehicles carrying dangerous goods

Proceed right for vehicles carrying dangerous goods

Proceed left for vehicles carrying dangerous goods

== Special regulation signs ==
One-way street

End of one-way street

One-way street to the right

One-way street to the left

Bus lane

End of bus lane

A road with a contraflow bus lane

End of road with a contraflow bus lane

Exit to the road with a contraflow bus lane to the left

Exit to the road with a contraflow bus lane to the right

Minimum driving speed limit in lanes

Maximum driving speed limit in lanes

Driving directions in lanes

Driving direction in the lane (proceed straight)

Driving direction in the lane (turn right)

Driving direction in the lane (turn left)

Driving direction in the lane (proceed straight or turn right)

Driving direction in the lane (proceed straight or keep left)

Settlement

End of settlement

Settlement

End of settlement

No parking area

Customs area

End of no parking area

End of customs area

Speed limit zone

End of speed limit zone

Pedestrian zone

End of pedestrian zone

Parking zone

End of parking zone

Recommended speed zone

End of recommended speed zone

Home zone

End of home zone

Pedestrian crossing

Pedestrian crossing (with fluoro board)

Pedestrian crossing

Pedestrian crossing (with fluoro board)

Parking

End of parking

Paid parking

End of paid parking

Bus stop

Tram stop

Taxi stop

Tunnel

End of tunnel

Stop line

Border area

End of border area

Borderland

End of borderland

Border control point

Road for motor vehicles

End of road for motor vehicles

Emergency lay-by

Locality

End of locality

== Service signs ==
First aid or Hospital

Hospital

Workshop

Telephone

Gas station

Hotel

Restaurant

Coffee

Park and Ride facilities

Car wash

Youth tourism center

WC

Camping

Caravan parking

Camping and caravan parking

Resting place

Pedestrian route

Swimming pool

Tourist information

Police

Traffic police

Mail

Radio channel for providing road traffic information

Airport (airfield)

Bus station

Railway station

Sea passenger station

Ferry

Cargo port

Information block

A remarkable place

Fire extinguisher

Emergency phone

Rural tourism seat

== Direction signs ==
Preliminary direction indicator

Preliminary direction indicator

Preliminary direction indicator

Preliminary direction indicator

Preliminary direction indicator

Direction indicator

Direction indicator

Direction indicator

Direction indicator

Direction indicator

Direction indicator

Distance indicator

Distance indicator

River name

Driving scheme

Obstacle bypass direction

Dead end

Dead end on the right

Dead end on the left

Start of lane on the right

Start of lane on the left

End of lane on the right

End of lane on the left

Driving directions in lanes (no trucks allowed in one lane)

Driving directions in lanes

Driving directions in lanes

Lane adherence to base lanes

Lane adherence to base lanes

U-turn permitted

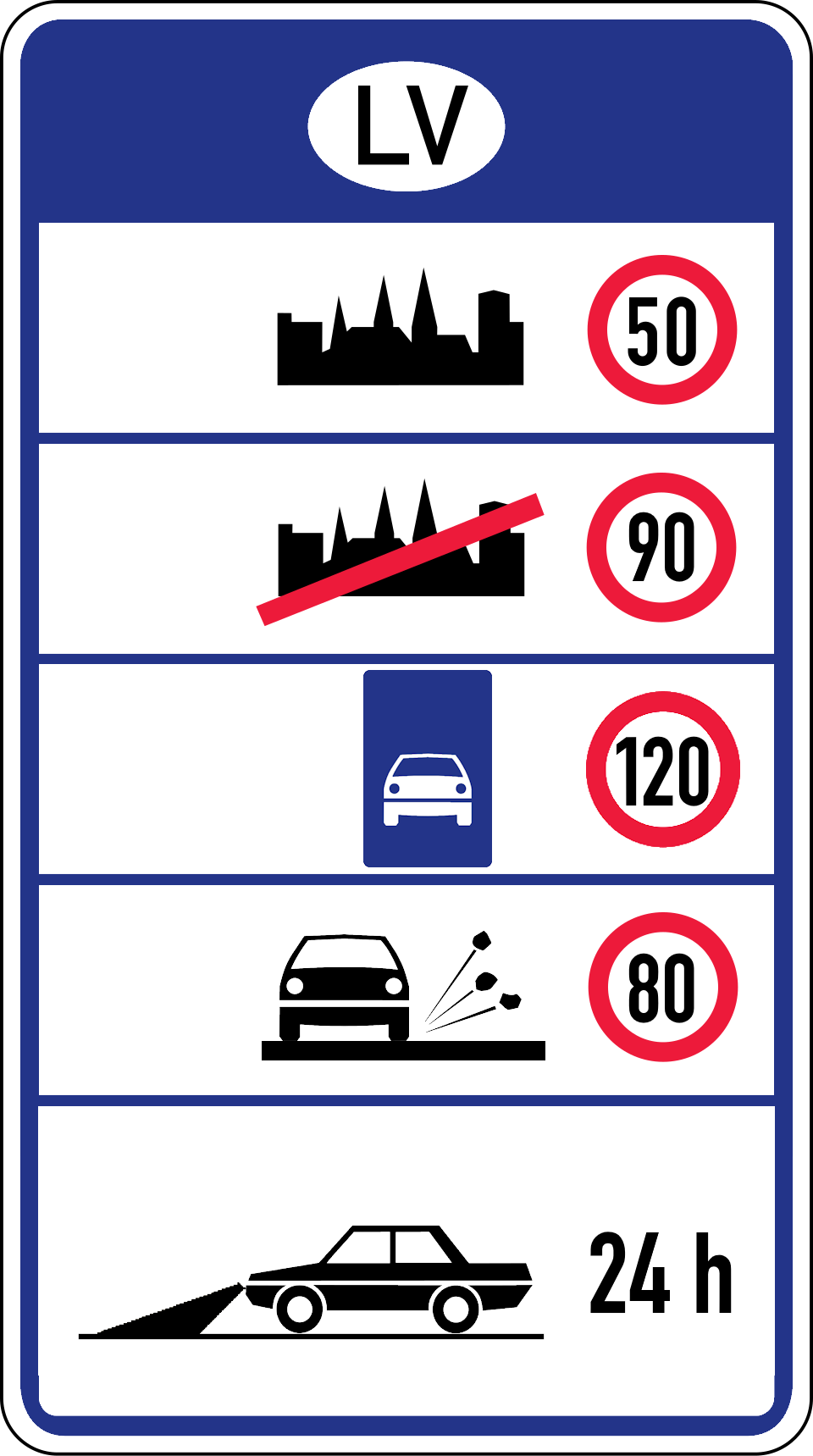
Speed limits in Latvia

Recommended speed

Driving direction of trucks (proceed straight)

Driving direction of trucks (turn right)

Driving direction of trucks (turn left)

Pedestrian underpass or overpass

Scheme of bypass road

Direction of bypass road (proceed straight)

Direction of bypass road (turn right)

Direction of bypass road (turn left)

End of detour

Pointer to reorder

Pointer to reorder

Pointer to reorder

Pointer to reorder

Pointer to reorder

Kilometer indicator

European route number

Primary road number

Regional road number

Number of local road

European route number and direction

Primary road and direction

Regional road number and direction

Road with reverse traffic

End of road with reverse traffic

Departure on a road with reverse traffic

EU country border
(formerly used before 2004)

Name of the administrative territory

Tourist sign

Emergency exit

Emergency exit direction

Expressway exit

== Additional signs ==
Distance

Stop ahead

Length

Coverage area

Coverage area

Coverage area

Coverage area

Coverage area

Coverage area

Coverage area

Coverage area

Coverage area

Coverage area

Directions of action

Directions of action

Directions of action

Driving lane

Type of vehicle (truck)

Type of vehicle (truck with lane)

Type of vehicle (car)

Type of vehicle (bus)

Type of vehicle (tractor)

Type of vehicle (motorcycle)

Type of vehicle (bike)

Working days

Weekends and holidays

Validity period

Validity period in working days

Validity period in weekends and holidays

Type of vehicle parking

Type of vehicle parking

Type of vehicle parking

Type of vehicle parking

Type of vehicle parking

Type of vehicle parking

Type of vehicle parking

Type of vehicle parking

Type of vehicle parking

Type of vehicle parking

Parking time

Automobile viewing area

Limitation of the permitted maximum mass

Blind pedestrians

Disabled people

Wet cover

Slippery cover

Direction of the main road

A tow truck is working

Other additional information

Speed bump

Paid parking time

Turn off the engine

Photo radar

Information about the bicycle path

Information about the bicycle path

Information about the bicycle path

Bicycle route

EuroVelo cycle route

Supply of goods

Electric cars

== Historic signs ==
=== 1938 road signs ===
Uneven road

Series of bends

Crossroad

Level crossing with barriers

Level crossing without barriers

Danger

Yield

No vehicles

No entry

No motor vehicles except motorcycles

No motorcycles

No motor vehicles

Weight limit

Motor vehicle weight limit

Speed limit

Height limit

No parking

No stopping

No overtaking

No honking

No trucks

No animal-drawn vehicles

No bicycles

Mandatory direction

Cycle path

Customs

Priority road

Parking

Caution

First aid

== See also ==
- Comparison of European road signs
- Comparison of traffic signs in post-Soviet states
