= Road signs in Tajikistan =

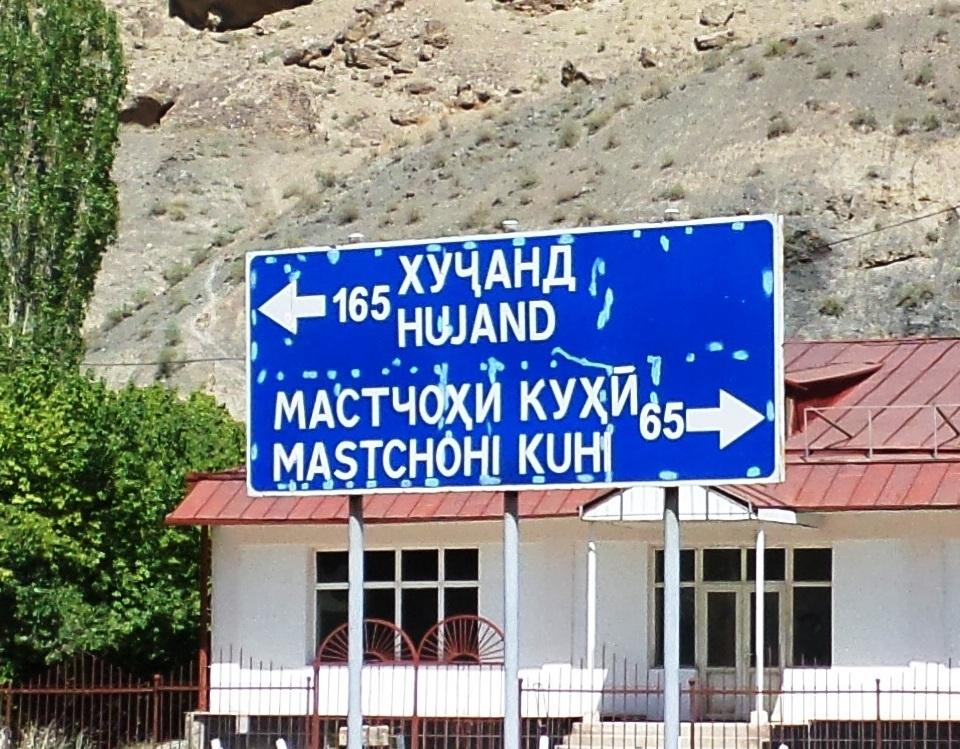
Road sign at the roundabout on the Dushanbe-Khujand highway

Road signs in Tajikistan are similar to the signs of other post-Soviet states and most European road sign systems. Like all post-Soviet states, road signs in Tajikistan are based on the Vienna Convention on Road Signs and Signals. Road signs and markings are regulated in the Traffic rules on the road (Tajik: Қоидаҳои ҳаракат дар роҳ). Road signs are mostly based on the Soviet GOST 10807-78, Belarusian STB 1140-2013 and Russian GOST R 52290-2004 standards.

== Warning signs ==
1.1 Railway crossing with a barrier

1.2 Railway crossing without a barrier

1.3.1 Single-track railway

1.3.2 Multi-track railway

1.4.1 Approaching a railway crossing

1.4.2 Approaching a railway crossing

1.4.3 Approaching a railway crossing

1.4.4 Approaching a railway crossing

1.4.5 Approaching a railway crossing

1.4.6 Approaching a railway crossing

1.5 Trams

1.6 Intersection

1.7 Roundabout

1.8 Traffic signals

1.9 Drawbridge

1.10 Departure to the embankment

1.11.1 Dangerous curve

1.11.2 Dangerous curve

1.12.1 Dangerous curves

1.12.2 Dangerous curves

1.13 Steep descent

1.14 Steep climb

1.15 Slippery road

1.16 Rough road

1.17 Gravel surface

1.18.1 Road narrows on both sides

1.18.2 Road narrows on the right

1.18.3 Road narrows on the left

1.19 Two-way traffic

1.20 Pedestrian crossing

1.21 Children

1.22 Intersection with a bike path or bike and pedestrian path

1.23 Roadworks

1.24 Cattle

1.25 Deer

1.26 Falling rocks surface

1.27 Side wind

1.28 Low-flying aircraft

1.29 Tunnel

1.30 Other hazards

1.31.1 Hazard chevron

1.31.2 Hazard chevron

1.31.3 Hazard chevron

1.32 Congestion

1.33 Dangerous roadside

1.34 Bump

1.35 Accident danger zone

== Priority signs ==
2.1 Priority road

2.2 End of the priority road

2.3.1 Intersection with a secondary road

2.3.2 Secondary road junction

2.3.3 Secondary road junction

2.3.4 Secondary road junction

2.3.5 Secondary road junction

2.3.6 Secondary road junction

2.3.7 Secondary road junction

2.4 Give way

2.5 Stop

2.6 Oncoming traffic has priority

2.7 Priority over oncoming traffic

== Prohibitory signs ==
3.1 Entry is prohibited

3.2 Traffic is prohibited

3.3 The movement of motor vehicles is prohibited

3.4 Lorries exceeding indicated weight prohibited

3.5 The movement of motorcycles is prohibited

3.6 The movement of tractors is prohibited

3.7 Driving with a trailer is prohibited

3.8 The movement of horse-drawn carts is prohibited

3.9 Cycling is prohibited

3.10 Pedestrian traffic is prohibited

3.11 Vehicle weight limit

3.12 Limitation of the mass per axle of the vehicle

3.13 Height limit

3.14 Width limit

3.15 Length limit

3.16 Limitation of the minimum distance

3.17.1 Customs

3.17.2 Danger

3.17.3 Control

3.18.1 Turning to the right is prohibited

3.18.2 Turning to the left is prohibited

3.19 U-turn is prohibited

3.20 Overtaking is prohibited

3.21 End of overtaking prohibition zone

3.22 Overtaking by trucks is prohibited

3.23 End of the zone prohibiting overtaking by trucks

3.24 Maximum speed limit

3.25 End of the maximum speed limit zone

3.26 Beeping is prohibited

3.27 Stopping is prohibited

3.28 Parking is prohibited

3.29 Parking is prohibited on odd days of the month

3.30 Parking is prohibited on even days of the month

3.31 End of all restrictions zone

3.32 The movement of vehicles with dangerous goods is prohibited

3.33 The movement of vehicles with explosive and flammable loads is prohibited

3.34 No buses

3.35 End of no buses

== Mandatory signs ==
4.1.1 Driving straight

4.1.2 Moving to the right

4.1.3 Movement to the left

4.1.4 Driving straight or to the right

4.1.5 Driving straight or left

4.1.6 Movement to the right or to the left

4.2.1 Detour of the obstacle on the right

4.2.2 Detour of the obstacle on the left

4.2.3 Detour obstacles on the right of left

4.3 Direction of roundabout traffic

4.4 Passenger car traffic

4.5.1 Bicycle path

4.5.2 End of a bike lane

4.6.1 Footpath

4.6.2 End of footpath

4.7 Minimum speed limit

4.8 End of the minimum speed limit zone

4.9.1 Direction of movement of vehicles with dangerous goods (turn left)

4.9.2 Direction of movement of vehicles with dangerous goods (proceed straight)

4.9.3 Direction of movement of vehicles with dangerous goods (turn right)

== Information signs ==
5.1 Motorway

5.2 End of the motorway

5.3 Road for cars

5.4 End of the road for cars

5.5 One-way road

5.6 End of one-way road

5.7.1 Exit to a one-way road

5.7.2 Exit to a one-way road

5.8.1 Lane directions

5.8.2 Lane directions

5.8.2 Lane directions

5.8.2 Lane directions

5.8.2 Lane directions

5.8.2 Lane directions

5.8.2 Lane directions

5.8.2 Lane directions

5.8.3 The beginning of the lane

5.8.3 The beginning of the lane

5.8.4 The beginning of the lane

5.8.5 End of the lane

5.8.6 End of the lane

5.8.7 Lane direction

5.8.8 Lane direction

5.8.8 Lane direction

5.8.9 Number of lanes with speed limits

5.9 Bus lane

5.10.1 A road with a line for fixed-route vehicles

5.10.2 End of the road with a lane for fixed-route vehicles

5.10.3 Exit to the road with a lane for fixed-route vehicles

5.10.4 Exit to the road with a lane for fixed-route vehicles

5.11.1 U-turn

5.11.2 U-turn

5.12 Number of lanes

5.13 Bus and/or trolleybus stop location

5.14 Tram stop location

5.15 Parking place for passenger taxis

5.16.1 Pedestrian crossing

5.16.2 Pedestrian crossing

5.17.1 Subway (underpass)

5.17.2 Subway (underpass)

5.17.3 Footbridge

5.17.4 Footbridge

5.18 Recommended speed

5.19.1 Dead end

5.19.2 Dead end

5.19.3 Dead end

5.20.1 A preliminary sign of directions

5.20.1 A preliminary sign of directions

5.20.1 A preliminary sign of directions

5.20.1 A preliminary sign of directions

5.20.2 A preliminary sign of direction

5.20.2 A preliminary sign of direction

5.20.3 Traffic scheme

5.21.1 Pointing direction

5.21.1 Pointing direction

5.21.1 Pointing direction

5.21.2 Pointing directions

5.22.1 Entrance to built-up area

5.22.2 Entrance to built-up area

5.23.1 End of built-up area

5.23.2 End of built-up area

5.24 Entrance to locality

5.25 End of locality

5.26 Name of the facility (river)

5.27 Distance pointer

5.28 Kilometer sign

5.29 Route number

5.30.1 Direction of movement for trucks

5.30.2 Direction of movement for trucks

5.30.3 Direction of movement for trucks

5.31 Detour scheme

5.32.1 Detour direction

5.32.2 Detour direction

5.32.3 Detour direction

5.33 Stop line

5.34.1 Preliminary index of the lane change to another carriageway

5.34.2 Preliminary index of the lane change to another carriageway

5.35 Reversible lane

5.36 End of reversible lane

5.37 Reversible lane

5.38 Residential area

5.39 End of residential area

5.40 Bump

5.41 Restricted parking area

5.42 End of the parking restriction zone

5.43 Regulated parking area

5.44 End of the regulated parking area

5.45 Zone with maximum speed limit

5.46 End of zone with maximum speed limit

5.47 Pedestrian zone

5.48 End of pedestrian zone

5.49 General maximum speed limits

5.50 Emergency stop lane

5.51.1 Toll road

5.51.2 End of toll road

5.52.1 Emergency exit

5.52.2 Emergency exit

5.53.1 Direction of movement to the emergency exit

5.53.2 Direction of movement to the emergency exit

== Service signs ==
6.1 Point of medical care

6.2 Hospital

6.3.1 Gas station

6.3.2 Gas station

6.3.3 Gas station

6.4 Vehicle maintenance

6.5 Car washing

6.6 Phone

6.7 Food point

6.8 Drinking water

6.9 Hotel or motel

6.10 Camping

6.11 Place of rest

6.12 Traffic police post

6.13 Militia

6.14 Transport control point

6.15 Pool or beach

6.16 Toilet

6.17 Fire extinguisher

== Additional plates ==
7.1.1 Distance to the object

7.1.2 Distance to the object

7.1.3 Distance to the object

7.1.4 Distance to the object

7.2.1 Coverage area

7.2.2 Coverage area

7.2.3 Coverage area

7.2.4 Coverage area

7.2.5 Coverage area

7.2.6 Coverage area

7.3.1 Directions of action

7.3.2 Directions of action

7.3.3 Directions of action

7.4.1 Type of vehicle

7.4.2 Type of vehicle

7.4.3 Type of vehicle

7.4.4 Type of vehicle

7.4.5 Type of vehicle

7.4.6 Type of vehicle

7.4.7 Type of vehicle

7.4.8 Type of vehicle

7.5.1 Saturdays, Sundays and holidays

7.5.2 Working days

7.5.3 Days of the week

7.5.4 Validity period

7.5.5 Validity period

7.5.6 Validity period

7.5.7 Validity period

7.6.1 Method of parking the vehicle

7.6.2 Method of parking the vehicle

7.6.3 Method of parking the vehicle

7.6.4 Method of parking the vehicle

7.6.5 Method of parking the vehicle

7.6.6 Method of parking the vehicle

7.6.7 Method of parking the vehicle

7.6.8 Method of parking the vehicle

7.6.9 Method of parking the vehicle

7.7 Parking with an idle engine

7.8 Paid services

7.9 Limitation of parking duration

7.10 Place for car inspection

7.11 Limitation of the permitted maximum mass

7.12 Dangerous roadside

7.13 Direction of the main road

7.14 Traffic lane

7.15 Blind pedestrians

7.16 Wet coating

7.17 Disabled people

7.18 Except for the disabled

7.19 Dangerous goods class

7.20.1 Type of vehicle trolley

7.20.2 Type of vehicle trolley

7.21.1 Type of route vehicle

7.21.2 Type of route vehicle

7.21.3 Type of route vehicle

7.22.1 Obstacle

7.22.2 Obstacle

7.22.3 Obstacle

7.23 Number of dangerous turns

7.24 The tow truck is working

7.25 Road marking

7.26 Emergency help

7.27.1 Type of danger

7.27.2 Type of danger

7.27.3 Type of danger

7.27.4 Type of danger

7.28 Traffic control (photo and video)
