= Stop bar =

Stop bar or stopbar may refer to:

- A system of red lights on an airport taxiway signalling an aircraft not to proceed to the runway.
- Stop line, a transverse road surface marking
- Stopbar tailpiece on the stoptail bridge of an electric guitar or archtop guitar
