= Road signs in Russia =

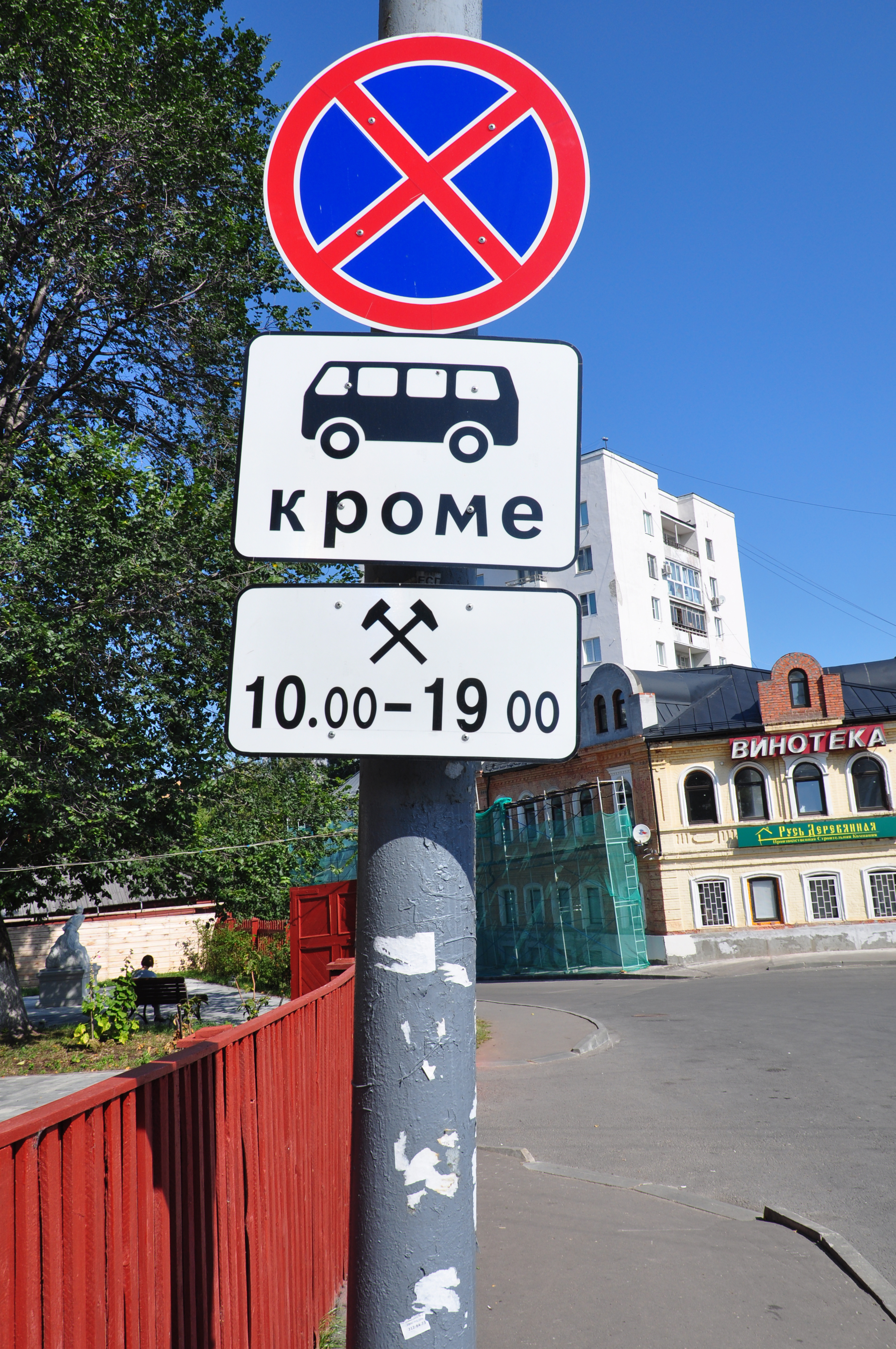
Road signs in Nizhny Novgorod

Road signs in Russia are governed by the traffic rules approved by the Decree of the Government of the Russian Federation No. 1090 of 23 October 1993 "On the Rules of the Road", Appendix 1 "Road Signs". They are regulated by the GOST R 52289-2019 and GOST R 52290-2004 standards determining the rules for the use and production of road signs.

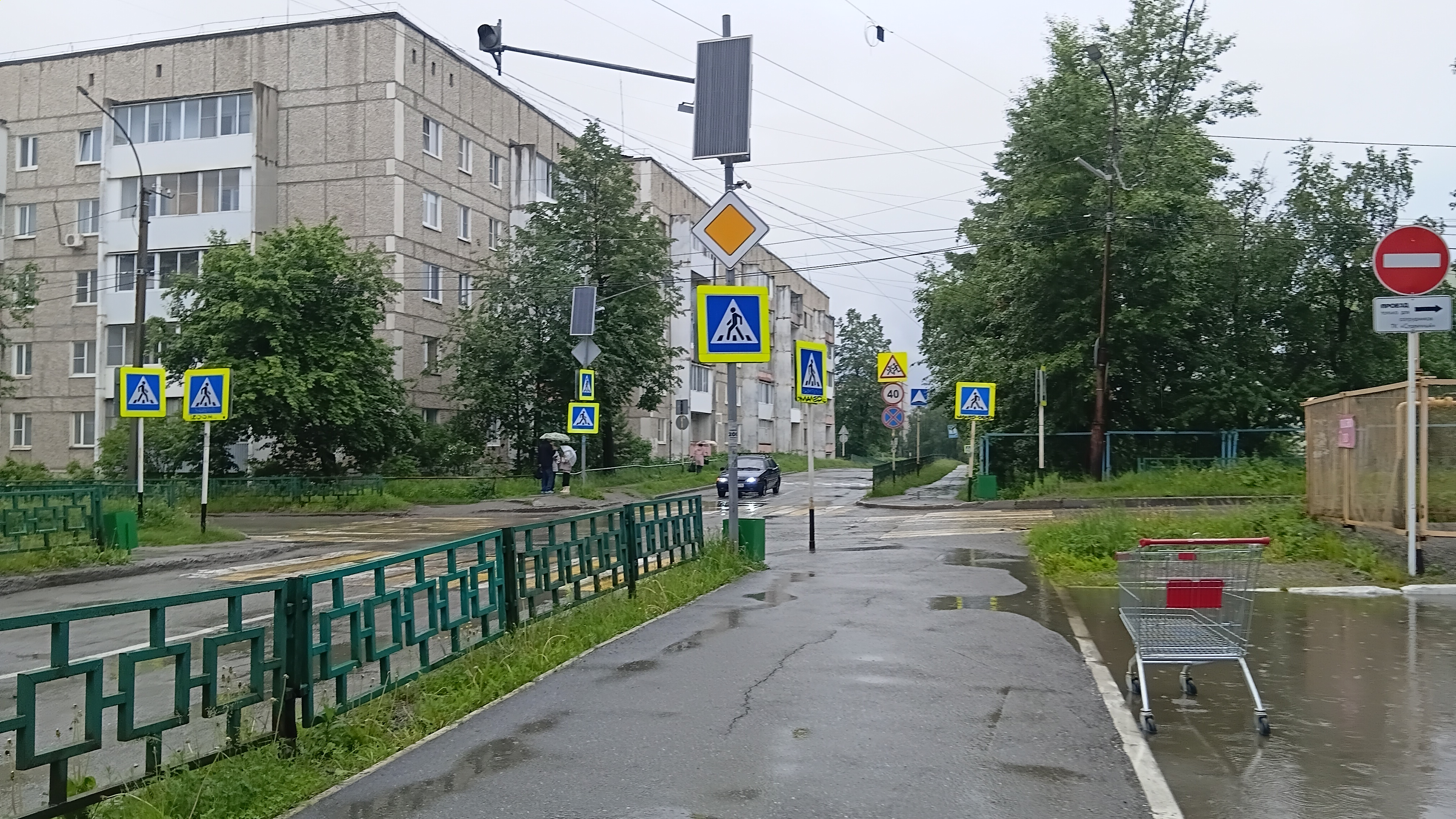
Road signs at the intersection in Krasnoturyinsk

The vast majority of road signs used in Russia were in the preceding Soviet standard GOST 10807-78, which was introduced in the Soviet Union on 1 January 1980 and is no longer valid in Russia since 1 January 2006 after it was replaced by the 2004 standard. Road signs generally conform to the Vienna Convention on Road Signs and Signals. Similar road signs are also used in other post-Soviet states.

The official typeface of road signs in Russia is specified in the GOST R 52290-2004 standard, having been initially specified in the GOST 10807-78 standard. However, Arial is often used on road signs instead.

== History ==
The world's first road signs were approved at an international conference of motorists in 1909; among the participants were the Russian Empire. There were four road signs of that time and all of them were round: "uneven surface", "crossroads", "bends", and "railway crossing". New road signs and signals were officially adopted already in the USSR on 1 December 1927. In 1933, the number of road signs in the USSR was increased to 23 and they received the current shapes and colours, and for the first time they were divided into three categories: "warning", "prohibition" and "indicative". The following changes and additions regarding road signs were adopted on 1 January 1961, after the USSR joined the Geneva Convention on Road Traffic in 1959. The number of road signs has increased to 36. All signs received a yellow background. In 1968, the Convention on Road Traffic and Road Signs and Signals was created in Vienna. On 8 November 1968, the Soviet Union signed the Vienna Convention on Road Signs and Signals, and on 7 June 1974 ratified it. New rules of the road, as well as road signs adopted by this convention, entered into force in the USSR in 1973. Subsequently, changes and additions to the rules of the road, road signs and signals were made in 1975, 1976, 1979, 1980, 1984 and 1987.

Currently, the most common signs are made on a metal substrate covered with a reflective film. Signs that are illuminated around the perimeter or along the contour of the image of the sign, made using miniature incandescent lamps or LEDs, have become slightly widespread.

On 1 January 2006, the modern standard GOST R 52290-2004 for road signs was introduced in Russia, completely replacing the Soviet standard GOST 10807-78. New road signs were introduced in the GOST R 52290-2004 standard:

- Three new warning signs:
  - "Speed bump";
  - "Dangerous roadside";
  - "Congestion".
- A new prohibitory sign "Control" prohibiting passage without stopping at checkpoints is used instead of a stop sign.
- Images of mandatory signs "Turn right" and "Turn left" modified by replacing straight arrows used during the Soviet era with 90-degree ones.
- A new category, special regulations signs, with new road signs:
  - "Number of lanes";
  - "Restricted parking zone";
  - "End of restricted parking zone";
  - "Regulated parking zone";
  - "End of regulated parking zone";
  - "Maximum speed limit zone";
  - "End of maximum speed limited zone";
  - "Pedestrian zone";
  - "End of the pedestrian zone".
- A new sign indicating general speed limits in Russia introduced.
- New service road signs, "reception area of a radio station transmitting traffic information" and "radio communication area with emergency services" were introduced in connection with the development of mobile radio communications in Russia.
- New additional signs indicating various obstacles on the road (refuge islands, traffic islands, etc.).

In June 2018, in connection with the preparations for the 2018 FIFA World Cup in Russia, a new prohibition road sign, "no buses allowed", was introduced. This sign was used as a temporary sign from 1 June to 17 July 2018 during the 2018 FIFA World Cup and after the end of the World Cup, the sign was retired. However, from 1 March 2023, this sign was reintroduced, on a permanent basis, due to changes in the rules of the road in Russia that came into force on that date.

In February 2019, the traffic police supported proposals for the introduction of reduced road signs, the idea was initiated by the Moscow government. They are planned to be installed throughout Russia after a successful experiment. The allowable size of signs will be reduced to 40 cm (16 inches) in diameter, and in some cases to 35 cm (14 inches), which is almost half the current standard of 60 cm (24 inches).

On 1 March 2023, a new prohibition road sign, "no personal mobility devices", was introduced. It prohibits personal transporters such as electric scooters, electric skateboards, hoverboards, or segways.

== Dimensions ==
Road signs are manufactured in four sizes: I (small), II (normal), III (large), and IV (very large).

== Warning signs ==
1.1 Railway crossing with barriers

1.2 Railway crossing without barriers

1.3.1 Single-track railway

1.3.2 Multi-track railway

1.4.1 Approaching a railway crossing

1.4.2 Approaching a railway crossing

1.4.3 Approaching a railway crossing

1.4.4 Approaching a railway crossing

1.4.5 Approaching a railway crossing

1.4.6 Approaching a railway crossing

1.5 Tramway crossing

1.6 Intersection of equivalent roads

1.7 Roundabout

1.8 Traffic signals

1.9 Drawbridge

1.10 Exit to the embankment

1.11.1 Sharp curve to the right

1.11.2 Sharp curve to the left

1.12.1 Sharp curves, first to the right

1.12.2 Sharp curves, first to the left

1.13 Steep descent

1.14 Steep ascent

1.15 Slippery road

1.16 Rough road

1.17 Speed bump

1.18 Gravel surface

1.19 Dangerous roadside

1.20.1 Road narrows on both sides

1.20.2 Road narrows on the right

1.20.3 Road narrows on the left

1.21 Two-way traffic

1.22 Pedestrian crossing

1.23 Children

1.24 Bicycle path crossing

1.25 Roadworks

1.26 Cattle

1.27 Wild animals

1.28 Rockfall

1.29 Crosswind

1.30 Low-flying aircraft

1.31 Tunnel

1.32 Traffic jam

1.33 Other hazards

1.34.1 Hazard chevron

1.34.1 Hazard chevron

1.34.1 Hazard chevron

1.34.2 Hazard chevron

1.34.2 Hazard chevron

1.34.2 Hazard chevron

1.34.3 Hazard chevron

1.34.3 Hazard chevron

1.35 Box junction

== Priority signs ==
2.1 Priority road

2.2 End of the priority road

2.3.1 Intersection with a minor road

2.3.2 Side road intersection with a minor road

2.3.3 Side road intersection with a minor road

2.3.4 Side road intersection with a minor road

2.3.5 Side road intersection with a minor road

2.3.6 Side road intersection with a minor road

2.3.7 Side road intersection with a minor road

2.4 Give way

2.5 Stop sign

2.6 Priority of oncoming traffic

2.7 Priority over oncoming traffic

== Prohibitory signs ==
3.1 No entry

3.2 No vehicles

3.3 No motor vehicles

3.4 No lorries

3.5 No motorcycles

3.6 No tractors

3.7 No vehicles with trailer

3.8 No horse-drawn carts

3.9 No cycling

3.10 No pedestrians

3.11 Weight limit

3.12 Weight limit per axle

3.13 Height limit

3.14 Width limit

3.15 Length limit

3.16 Minimum distance limit

3.17.1 Customs

3.17.2 Danger

3.17.3 Checkpoint

3.18.1 No right turn

3.18.2 No left turn

3.19 No U-turn

3.20 No overtaking

3.21 End of overtaking restriction

3.22 No overtaking by trucks

3.23 End of overtaking by trucks

3.24 Maximum speed limit

3.25 End of maximum speed limit

3.26 No beeping

3.27 No stopping

3.28 No parking

3.29 No parking on odd days of the month

3.30 No parking on even days of the month

3.31 End of all restrictions

3.32 No vehicles with dangerous goods

3.33 No vehicles with explosive and flammable loads

3.34 No buses

3.35 No personal mobility devices

== Mandatory signs ==
4.1.1 Proceed straight

4.1.2 Turn right

4.1.3 Turn left

4.1.4 Proceed straight or turn right

4.1.5 Proceed straight or turn left

4.1.6 Turn left or right

4.2.1 Keep right

4.2.2 Keep left

4.2.3 Keep right or left

4.3 Roundabout

4.4.1 Cycle path

4.4.2 End of a cycle path

4.5.1 Footpath

4.5.2 Shared-use path

4.5.3 End of shared-use path

4.5.4 Segregated pedestrian and cycle path

4.5.5 Segregated pedestrian and cycle path

4.5.6 End of segregated pedestrian and cycle path

4.5.7 End of segregated pedestrian and cycle path

4.6 Minimum speed limit

4.7 End of minimum speed limit

4.8.1 Direction of movement of vehicles with dangerous goods

4.8.2 Direction of movement of vehicles with dangerous goods

4.8.3 Direction of movement of vehicles with dangerous goods

== Special regulations signs ==
5.1 Motorway

5.2 End of motorway

5.3 Road for cars

5.4 End of road for cars

5.5 One-way road

5.6 End of one-way road

5.7.1 Exit to a one-way road

5.7.2 Exit to a one-way road

5.8 Reversible lane

5.9 End of reversible lane

5.10 Exit to road with reversible lane

5.11.1 Road with a contraflow bus lane

5.11.2 Road with a contraflow cycle lane

5.12.1 End of road with a contraflow bus lane

5.12.2 End of road with a contraflow cycle lane

5.13.1 Exit to road with a contraflow bus lane

5.13.2 Exit to road with a contraflow bus lane

5.13.3 Exit to road with a contraflow cycle lane

5.13.4 Exit to road with a contraflow cycle lane

5.14.1 Bus lane

5.14.2 Cycle lane

5.14.3 End of bus lane

5.14.4 End of cycle lane

5.15.1 Lane directions

5.15.2 Directions of movement along the lane

5.15.2 Directions of movement along the lane

5.15.2 Directions of movement along the lane

5.15.2 Directions of movement along the lane

5.15.2 Directions of movement along the lane

5.15.2 Directions of movement along the lane

5.15.2 Directions of movement along the lane

5.15.2 Directions of movement along the lane

5.15.2 Directions of movement along the lane

5.15.2 Directions of movement along the lane

5.15.3 The beginning of the lane

5.15.3 The beginning of the lane

5.15.3 The beginning of the lane

5.15.4 The beginning of the lane

5.15.4 The beginning of the lane

5.15.5 End of the lane

5.15.6 End of the lane

5.15.7 Lane direction

5.15.7 Lane direction

5.15.7 Lane direction

5.15.8 Number of lanes

5.15.9 Beginning of the stripes

5.15.9 Beginning of the stripes

5.15.9 Beginning of the stripes

5.16 Bus and/or trolleybus stop location

5.17 Tram stop location

5.18 Parking place for passenger taxis

5.19.1 Pedestrian crossing

5.19.1 Pedestrian crossing (with fluoro board)

5.19.2 Pedestrian crossing

5.19.2 Pedestrian crossing (with fluoro board)

5.20 Speed bump

5.21 Residential area

5.22 End of the residential area

5.23.1 Locality begins

5.23.2 Built-up area begins

5.24.1 End of locality

5.24.2 End of built-up area

5.25 Locality begins

5.26 End of locality

5.27 No parking zone

5.28 End of no parking zone

5.29 Regulated parking zone

5.30 End of the regulated parking zone

5.31 Maximum speed limit zone

5.32 End of maximum speed limit zone

5.33 Pedestrian zone

5.34 End of pedestrian zone

5.35 Zone with restriction of ecological class of motor vehicles

5.36 End of zone with restriction of ecological class of motor vehicles

5.37 Zone with restriction of ecological class of trucks

5.37 Zone with restriction of ecological class of trucks

5.38 End of zone restriction of ecological class of trucks

5.38 End of zone restriction of ecological class of trucks

5.39 Cycle zone

5.40 End of cycle zone

5.41 No stopping zone

5.42 End of no stopping zone

== Information signs ==
6.1 General maximum speed limits

6.2 Recommended speed

6.2.1 Recommended speed when driving over speed bumps

6.3.1 U-turn

6.3.2 U-turn area

6.4 Parking (parking space)
(variations: and)

6.5 Emergency stop lane

6.6 Underground pedestrian crossing

6.7 Aboveground pedestrian crossing

6.8.1 Dead end street

6.8.2 Deadlock

6.8.3 Deadlock

6.9.1 Preliminary direction indicator

6.9.1 Preliminary direction indicator

6.9.1 Preliminary direction indicator

6.9.1 Preliminary direction indicator

6.9.1 Preliminary direction indicator

6.9.2 Preliminary direction indicator

6.9.2 Preliminary direction indicator

6.9.2 Preliminary direction indicator

6.9.3 Traffic scheme

6.10.1 Direction indicator

6.10.1 Direction indicator

6.10.1 Direction indicator

6.10.1 Direction indicator

6.10.1 Direction indicator

6.10.2 Direction indicator

6.10.2 Direction indicator

6.11 Name of the object

6.11 Name of the object

6.11 Name of the object

6.12 Distance indicator

6.12 Distance indicator

6.12 Distance indicator

6.13 Kilometer sign

6.13 Kilometer sign

6.13 Kilometer sign (Rosavtodor)

6.14.1 Route number

6.14.1 Route number

6.14.1 Route number

6.14.1 Route number

6.14.2 Route number

6.14.2 Route number

6.14.2 Route number

6.15.1 Direction of movement for trucks

6.15.2 Direction of movement for trucks

6.15.3 Direction of movement for trucks

6.16 Stop line

6.16.1 Stop line (Vertical)

6.17 Detour scheme

6.18.1 Detour direction

6.18.2 Detour direction

6.18.3 Detour direction

6.19.1 Preliminary index of the lane change to another carriageway

6.19.2 Preliminary index of the lane change to another carriageway

6.20.1 Emergency exit

6.20.2 Emergency exit

6.21.1 Direction of movement to the emergency exit

6.21.2 Direction of movement to the emergency exit

== Service signs ==
7.1 Point of medical care

7.2 Hospital

7.3 Gas station

7.4 Vehicle maintenance

7.5 Car washing

7.6 Phone

7.7 Food point

7.8 Drinking water

7.9 Hotel or motel

7.10 Camping

7.11 Place of rest

7.12 Traffic police post

7.13 Police

7.14.1 Customs control point

7.14.2 Transport control point

7.15 Reception area of a radio station transmitting traffic information

7.16 Radio communication area with emergency services

7.17 Pool or beach

7.18 Toilet

7.19 Emergency telephone number

7.20 Fire extinguisher

7.21 Gas station with possibility of charging electric vehicles

== Additional signs (plates) ==
8.1.1 Distance to the object

8.1.2 Distance to the object

8.1.3 Distance to the object

8.1.4 Distance to the object

8.2.1 Coverage area

8.2.2 Coverage area

8.2.3 Coverage area

8.2.4 Coverage area

8.2.5 Coverage area

8.2.6 Coverage area

8.3.1 Directions of action

8.3.2 Directions of action

8.3.3 Directions of action

8.3.4 Directions of action

8.3.5 Directions of action

8.4.1 Type of a vehicle (trucks)

8.4.2 Type of a vehicle (trailers)

8.4.3.1 Type of a vehicle (electromobiles)

8.4.3.2 Type of a vehicle (automobiles)

8.4.3.3 Type of a vehicle (passenger taxis)

8.4.4 Type of a vehicle (buses)

8.4.5 Type of a vehicle (tractors)

8.4.6 Type of a vehicle (motorcycles)

8.4.7 Type of a vehicle (bicycles)

8.4.7.2 Type of a vehicle (scooters)

8.4.8 Type of a vehicle (vehicles carrying dangerous goods)

8.4.9 Except for a vehicle (trucks)

8.4.10 Except for a vehicle type (automobiles)

8.4.11 Except for a vehicle type (buses)

8.4.12 Except for a vehicle type (motorcycles)

8.4.13 Except for a vehicle type (bicycles)

8.4.14 Except for a vehicle type (passenger taxis)

8.4.15 Except for a vehicle type (electromobiles)

8.4.16 Except for a vehicle type (scooters)

8.5.1 Saturdays, Sundays and holidays

8.5.2 Working days

8.5.3 Days of the week

8.5.4 Validity period (type 1, with time only)

8.5.5 Validity period (type 2, for holiday days)

8.5.6 Validity period (type 3, for week days)

8.5.7 Validity period (type 4, for days of the week)

8.5.8 Validity period (type 5, for months)

8.6.1 Method of parking the vehicle

8.6.2 Method of parking the vehicle

8.6.3 Method of parking the vehicle

8.6.4 Method of parking the vehicle

8.6.5 Method of parking the vehicle

8.6.6 Method of parking the vehicle

8.6.7 Method of parking the vehicle

8.6.8 Method of parking the vehicle

8.6.9 Method of parking the vehicle

8.7 Parking with an idle engine

8.8 Paid services

8.9.1 Limitation of parking duration

8.9.2 Parking for parking permit holders only

8.9.3 Parking of diplomatic corps vehicles only

8.10 Place for car inspection

8.11 Limitation of the permitted maximum mass

8.12 Dangerous roadside

8.13 Direction of the main road

8.13 Direction of the main road

8.14 Traffic lane

8.15 Blind pedestrians

8.15.1 Deaf pedestrians

8.16 Wet coating

8.16.2 Wet, snowy, icy coating

8.17 Disabled people

8.18 Except for the disabled

8.19 Dangerous goods classification

8.20.1 Trolley classification

8.20.2 Trolley classification

8.21.1 Type with route vehicle

8.21.2 Type of route vehicle

8.21.3 Type of route vehicle

8.22.1 Obstacle

8.22.2 Obstacle

8.22.3 Obstacle

8.23 Traffic enforcement camera

8.24 Tow-away zone

8.25 Environmental class of the vehicle

8.26 EV charging station

8.27 Without a pass

== Traffic signals ==
Pedestrian crossing signal

== Experimental signs ==
These signs are provided by ГОСТ Р 58398-2019 standard, but are not included in the Road Rules yet.

5.19.3 Diagonal pedestrian crossing

5.19.4 Diagonal pedestrian crossing

5.19.4 Diagonal pedestrian crossing

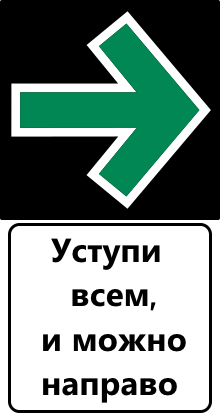
5.35 Turn right after giving way

== Similar systems ==
Similar road signs are used in most countries that formed after the collapse of the Soviet Union in 1991. Initially, the GOST 10807-78 standard was adopted in the Soviet Union in 1980, but after its collapse, the same standard continued to operate in many post-Soviet countries until some of these countries adopted their own standard, in particular, in Russia, the GOST R 52290-2004 standard was adopted, in Ukraine DSTU 4100:2021, in Belarus STB 1140-2013, in Kazakhstan ST RK 1412-2017, and in Uzbekistan O'zDst 3283:2017. Road signs in Armenia and Kyrgyzstan are entirely based on the GOST R 52290-2004 and GOST R 52289-2004 Russian standards. Inscriptions on road signs vary depending on the country's official language.

In Estonia and Latvia, road signs are outwardly different from the Russian ones. In Lithuania, road signs still bear a resemblance to those used in the Soviet Union, despite the fact that Lithuania restored its independence in 1990 and that the country joined the European Union in 2004. This is due to the fact that the Baltic states were occupied and later annexed by the Soviet Union in 1940 during the World War II.

== See also ==
- Comparison of European road signs
- Traffic signs in post-Soviet states
- Road signs in the Soviet Union
