= GOST =

CIS technical standards

GOST (Russian: ГОСТ) refers to a set of international technical standards maintained by the Euro-Asian Council for Standardization, Metrology and Certification (EASC), a regional standards organization operating under the auspices of the Commonwealth of Independent States (CIS).

All sorts of regulated standards are included, with examples ranging from charting rules for design documentation to recipes and nutritional facts of Soviet-era brand names. The latter have become generic, but may only be sold under the label if the technical standard is followed, or renamed if they are reformulated.

== History ==
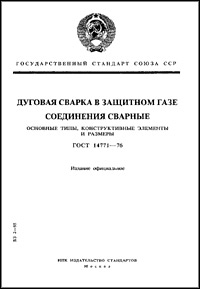
Cover page of a Soviet-era GOST standard (arc welding in protective atmosphere)

GOST standards were originally developed by the government of the Soviet Union as part of its national standardization strategy. The word GOST (Russian: ГОСТ) is an acronym for go'sudarstvennyy standart (Russian: государственный стандарт), which means 'government standard'.

The history of national standards in the USSR can be traced back to 1925, when a government agency, later named Gosstandart, was established and put in charge of writing, updating, publishing, and disseminating the standards. After World War II, the national standardization program went through a major transformation. The first GOST standard, GOST 1 State Standardization System, was published in 1968.

== Present ==
After the disintegration of the USSR, the GOST standards acquired a new status of the regional standards. They are now administered by the Euro-Asian Council for Standardization, Metrology and Certification (EASC), a standards organization chartered by the Commonwealth of Independent States.

At present, the collection of GOST standards includes over 20,000 titles used extensively in conformity assessment activities in 12 countries. Serving as the regulatory basis for government and private-sector certification programs throughout the Commonwealth of Independent States (CIS), the GOST standards cover energy, oil and gas, environmental protection, construction, transportation, telecommunications, mining, food processing, and other industries.

The following countries have adopted all or some of GOST standards in addition to their own, nationally developed standards: Russia, Belarus, Moldova, Kazakhstan, Azerbaijan, Armenia, Kyrgyzstan, Uzbekistan, Tajikistan, Georgia, and Turkmenistan.

Because GOST standards are adopted by Russia, the largest and most influential member of the CIS, it is a common misconception to think of GOST standards as the national standards of Russia. They are not. Since the EASC, the organization responsible for the development and maintenance of the GOST standards, is recognized by ISO as a regional standards organization, the GOST standards are classified as the regional standards. The national standards of Russia are the GOST R standards.

Ukraine scrapped its GOST (DSTU) standards in December 2015.

== GOST standards and technical specifications ==
The abbreviation GOST (rus) (SUST) (eng) stands for the State Union Standard. From its name we learn that most of the GOST standards of the Russian Federation came from the Soviet Union period. Creation and promotion of the Union Standards began in 1918 after introduction of the international systems of weights and measures.

The first body for standardization was created by the Council of Labor and Defense in 1925 and was named the Committee for Standardization. Its main objective was development and introduction of the Union standards OST standards. The first OST standards gave the requirements for iron and ferrous metals, selected sorts of wheat, and a number of consumer goods.

Until 1940, People's Commissariats had approved the standards. But in that year the Union Standardization Committee was founded and the standardization was redirected to creation of OST standards.

In 1968 the state system of standardization (SSS) as the first in the world practice. It included creating and developing five standards:

- GOST – State Standard of the Soviet Union
- RST – Republican standard
- IST – Industrial Standard
- STE – Standard of an Enterprise
- TU – Технические условия, literally "Technical conditions", a document setting technical requirements to which a specific product, material, substance, etc. must comply; example: TU 14-3-571-2004, for CrNi60WTi alloy

The level of technical development, and the need to develop and introduce informational calculating systems and many other factors, lead to creating complexes of standards and a number of large general technical standard systems. They are named inter-industrial standards. Within the state standard system they have their own indexes and the SSS has index 1. As of 2020, seven standard systems (GOST standards) are valid:

- USCD – The Uniform System of Constructor Documentation (index 2)
- USTD – The Uniform System of Technological Documentation (3)
- SIBD – The System of Information-Bibliographical Documentation (7)
- SSM – The State System of Providing the Uniformity of Measuring(8)
- SSLS – The System of Standards of Labor Safety(12)
- USPD – The Uniform System of Program Documentation (19)
- SSERTE – The System of Standards of Ergonomic Requirements and Technical Esthetic (29)

The USCD and USTD systems take special place among other inter-industrial systems. They are interrelated and they formulate requirements for general technical documentation in all industries of economy.

The task of harmonization of Russia's standards and the GOST standards was set in 1990 by the Soviet Council of Ministers at the beginning of the transit to market economy. At that time they formulated a direction that obeying the GOST standards may be obligatory or recommendable. The obligatory requirements are the ones that deal with safety, conformity of products, ecological friendliness and inter-changeability. The Act of the USSR Government permitted applying of national standards existing in other countries, international requirements if they meet the requirements of the people's economy.

During the past years a large number of GOST standards were developed and approved.

Nowadays there is a process of their revision so that they conform to international standard requirements. As the base is the system of international standards ISO, in Russia they created series of Russian standards such as GOST ISO 9001 or GOST ISO 14001, which absorbed the best developments of the world community but they also consider the Russia's specific.

=== Examples of more common GOST standards ===
The product conformity mark according to GOST 50460-92: Mark of conformity for mandatory certification. The shape, size and technical requirements (ГОСТ Р 50460-92 «Знак соответствия при обязательной сертификации. Форма, размеры и технические требования»)

- GOST 7.0.5: standard for bibliographies and references
- GOST 7.67: Country codes
- GOST 5461-59 and 13393-76: Vacuum tube designation system
- GOST 7396: standard for power plugs and sockets used in Russia and throughout the Commonwealth of Independent States
- GOST 10859: A 1964 character set for computers, includes non-ASCII characters required when programming in the ALGOL programming language.
- GOST 16876-71: a standard for Cyrillic-to-Latin transliteration
- GOST 27975-88: Programming language ALGOL 68 extended - Язык программирования АЛГОЛ 68 расширенный
- GOST 28147-89 block cipher – commonly referred to as just GOST in cryptography

== GOST R ==
GOST R, or Russian certification system, is a subset of GOST standards that is valid only the territory of the Russian Federation, in contrast to the GOST standards, used across all CIS countries, including Russia.

This system is aimed to ensure safety and quality of products and services and involves obligatory certification of certain goods, both produced locally and imported. List of products subject to obligatory certification is defined by the Russian Federal Technical Regulation and Metrology Agency. The very system of certification GOST R has been valid in Russia for many years. The main normative base for it was national standards. At the same time active policy of Russia towards entering the WTO was the reason for adopting the federal law no. 184-ФЗ "On Technical Regulation", designed to harmonise Russian technical regulations with European legislation.

== Certification systems ==
Creation of certification systems in Russia is provided by the Federal Law no. 184-ФЗ "On Technical Regulation." Evaluating the product's conformity to requirements of laws, standards, technical regulations and other kinds of normative acts appears to be one of the most important possibilities of providing safety of different kinds of products for humans, environment and the state.

According to the FL No. 184 any certification system includes:

- A central certification organ which performs organizational operations within the system;
- Certification organs that must prove their ability to perform activities in expertise and drawing up the certification documents in certain sphere of evaluation of conformity. Only certification organs authorized for such kinds of works, have right to perform such function;
- Certification laboratories performs tests and measurements of safety indicators or quality of the evaluated objects. Such laboratory must have equipment and trained staff (and test methods) to perform its activities. Existence of all the resources is proved by the Attestation of Authorization of the laboratory in the given sphere of activity;
- Applicants are individual entrepreneurs or Russian legal entities (in some cases foreign manufacturers), that intend to go through evaluation process to prove the conformity of their production to the legal requirements or some other certain requirements of the system of certification (to which it applied).

There is a great variety of objects for certification (different products and manufacturing processes, management systems, construction sites, etc.). A little smaller is the lists of risks that may be encountered by using some products and from which consumers should be protected. The variety of certification systems in Russia is explained by these two factors and by the wish of some corporations to introduce their own requirements for the product's deliverers.

There two big groups of certification systems in Russia: voluntary and obligatory ones. From the names, it is clear that the evaluation of conformity for the objects of obligatory certification system appears to be mandatory requirement for all Russian manufacturers and for the products from abroad.

== Obligatory certification ==
It is only federal state structure who can create the obligatory certification system of Russia. The system must go through the procedure of state registration. The Rosstandart which is responsible for the certification in Russia as a whole keeps a registry of the RF certification systems. Only after receiving the Certificate of state registration with getting the unique registration number, may activities be performed in evaluating conformity as a new system.

There are 16 obligatory certification systems in Russia:

- GOST R;
- Means of protection of information according to requirements of informational security;
- "Electrocommunication";
- Geodesic, cartographic and topographic production;
- On the federal Railway transport;
- Means of protection of information;
- Security of manufacturing of explosives;
- In the sphere of fire security;
- Means of protection of information according to requirements of security;
- Marine civil vessels;
- On the air transport of the RF;
- Air techniques and the objects of civil aviation;
- Space craft;
- For nuclear sets, the points of storing radioactive materials;
- Means of protecting the information that include the state secret;
- Immune biological preparations.

The obligatory GOST R certification system consists of sub-systems of certificating homogeneous products. The obligatory GOST R certification system consists of 40 sub-systems according to the kinds of homogeneous production. For example, the following sub-systems:

- Medical certification;
- The system of certification oil products;
- The system of certification of dishes;
- The system of certification of electrical equipment (SCE);
- The system of certification of mechanic transport means and trailers;
- The system of certification of gases;
- The "SEPROCHIM" certification system (rubber, asbestos) and many others.

The management of state property in the sphere of technical regulation, organizing and performing works in certification in the GOST R system is performed by the Rostechregulation (former Gosstandart) which appears to be the Federal agency for technical regulation and metrology (now is called Rosstandart). The given agency is part of the structure of the Ministry of Industry and Trade of the RF.

It became the very first and the largest system of evaluation of conformity in Russia and it encompasses all the groups of production that are to be evaluated according to the Federal Law "About protection of Consumers Rights" and it performs the other legislative acts considering separate kinds of goods The authority of the GOST R obligatory certification systems covers also the voluntary GOST R certification system because the applicants for the voluntary evaluation of conformity most often apply this very system.

== Voluntary certification ==
Any Russian citizen may register such evaluation system according to the Law. While creating the system they must set the list of objects to be evaluated on conformity in its frameworks, the indicators and characteristics in accord to which the voluntary certification will be performed, they must also formulate the rules of system and the pay order of the works in certification, and they must define the participants of the given system of evaluation of conformity.

Registration of voluntary certification system is similar to the procedure of registration of the obligatory system. In the case of refusal, the Rosstandart sends to the applicant explanations of reasons why the new system may not be registered. Nowadays there are more than 130 central certification organs that went through the registration procedure.

Examples of voluntary certification:

- Construction materials "Rosstroisertificazia";
- Personnel and housing services – "Roszhilkommunsertifikazia";
- Means of cryptographic protection of information;
- The production of the Gosstandart of Russia;
- Production and the quality systems defense industries – "Oboronsertifika";
- Certification of food "HAASP";
- Coal production;
- Jewelry (several systems in the given sphere with different names;
- Bio active materials – "BOSTI";
- Services in the sphere of advertising;
- Evaluation of intellectual property objects;
- Information technologies – "SSIT".

=== Corporative voluntary certification systems ===
- Fuel and energy complex (The System "Teksert");
- Equipment for the oil-gas industry "Neftegaz";
- GAZPROMSERT;

=== Regional national certification systems ===
- Trading services in Moscow;
- Trading services "Tulasert";
- Services of gas stations and complexes in Moscow;
- Fuel services in the Moscow Region;
- Services of retail sale in the Sakhalin Region;
- Services of retail sale in the Republic of Sakha (Yakutia);
- Services of gas stations and complexes of the Urals Region "URALSERT-AZS";
- Services of retail sale in St. Petersburg and others.

== See also ==
- Eurasian Conformity mark
