= Stop and yield lines =

Transverse road surface markings

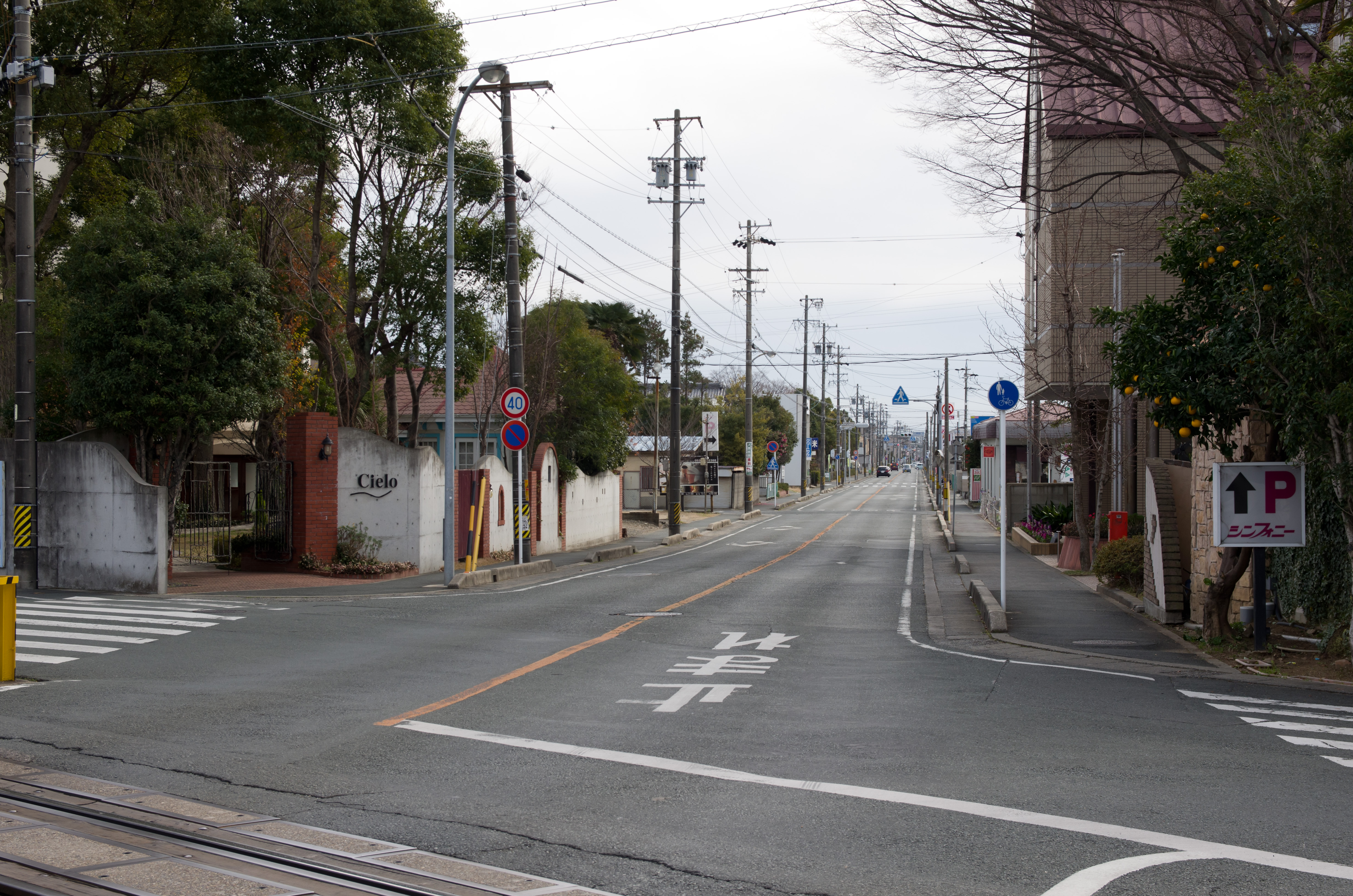
Stop line in Toyokawa, Aichi, Japan

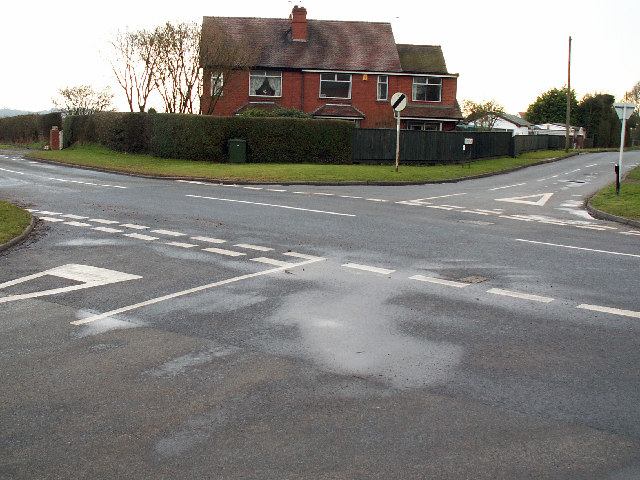
Give Way lines in the UK

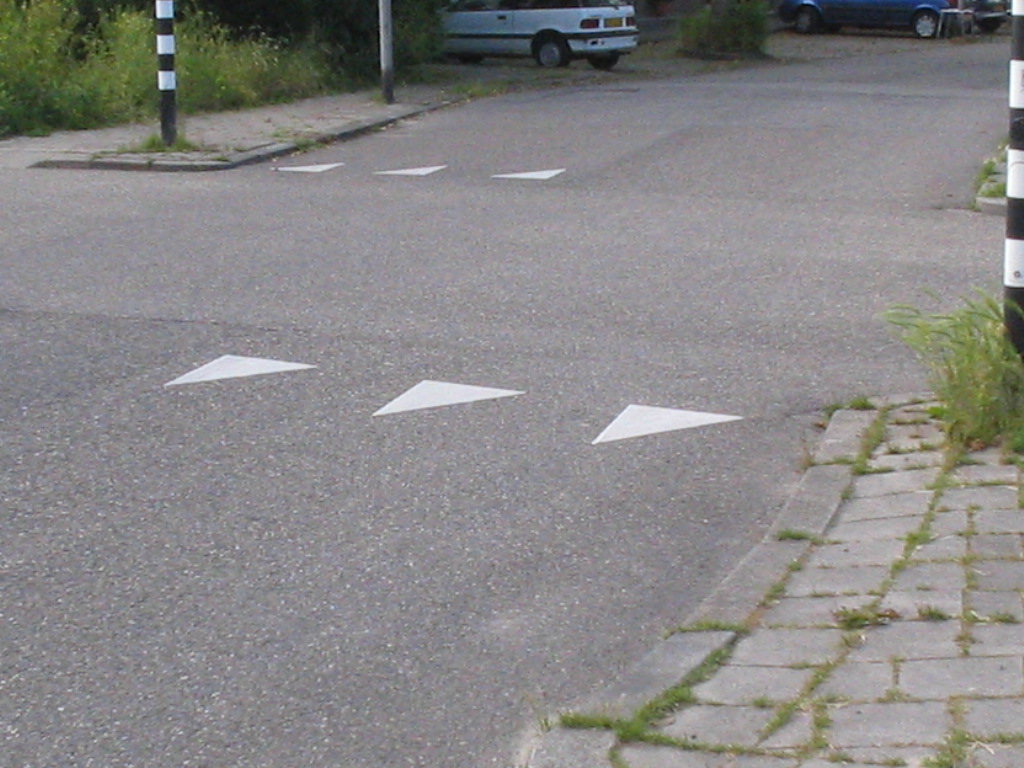
"Shark's teeth" yield lines (white isosceles triangles) as used in the US and many European countries

Stop and yield lines are transverse road surface markings that inform drivers where they should stop or yield when approaching an intersection. In some cases stop or yield lines are used in advance of mid-block crosswalks.

A stop line is a type of marking used to inform drivers of the point where they are required to stop at an intersection or roundabout controlled by a stop sign or traffic signal. It is also known as a stop bar.

A yield line, also called shark's teeth or a give way line, is a type of marking used to inform drivers of the point where they need to yield and give priority to conflicting vehicle or pedestrian traffic at an intersection or roundabout controlled by a yield sign.

On multi-lane roads, advance yield lines are used before mid-block crosswalks to prevent multiple-threat crashes. These occur when a driver yields to a pedestrian in a crosswalk, but the drivers in the adjacent lane cannot see the pedestrian because of the stopped vehicle. Another driver may pass the stopped vehicle and collide with pedestrians as they step out from in front of it. An advance yield line instructs the driver to stop far enough away from the crosswalk that other drivers can see around their vehicle. In jurisdictions where drivers are legally required to stop for pedestrians, an advance stop line may be used instead.
