= Traffic signs in post-Soviet states =

Overview of road signs in countries formed after the collapse of the USSR in 1991

Road signs in the post-Soviet states Russia, Armenia, Azerbaijan, Belarus, Estonia, Georgia, Kazakhstan, Kyrgyzstan, Latvia, Lithuania, Moldova, Tajikistan, Turkmenistan, Ukraine and Uzbekistan are largely similar to the Soviet road sign system, as these countries were part of the Soviet Union until its dissolution in 1991. However, in some countries of the former USSR, some road signs may look different from the Soviet ones. The Soviet Union was a signatory to the 1968 Vienna Convention on Road Signs and Signals. After the dissolution of the Soviet Union in 1991, most of the post-Soviet states adopted their own road sign standards. Many of them use road sign systems that inherited the road sign system used in the Soviet Union before 1991, but with some modifications, except for Estonia and Latvia which use distinct road sign systems.

Modern road signs in the post-Soviet states comply with the Vienna Convention on Road Signs and Signals. Of the 15 former post-Soviet states, only Russia, Belarus and Ukraine have signed and ratified the Vienna Convention on Road Signs and Signals on behalf of the Soviet socialist republics. These 3 countries have ratified this convention on 18 June 1974.

The standard for road signs, GOST 10807-78, was initially adopted in the Soviet Union on 1 January 1980, and remained in effect in several years in Russia and some post-Soviet states after the dissolution of the Soviet Union in 1991. However, since 1 January 2006, this standard has become invalid in Russia and has been replaced by GOST R 52290-2004.

A similar road sign system is used in Mongolia, despite the fact that it was never part of the Soviet Union.

All post-Soviet states drive on the right. Each of these countries also use metric system; thus speed limits are in kilometres per hour, and distances are in kilometres or metres.

Road signs in each of the 15 post-Soviet states are regulated by the following documents:

Road sign standards in post-Soviet states
Country	Document
Russia	О Правилах дорожного движения, ГОСТ Р 52289-2019 Технические средства организации дорожного движения. Правила применения дорожных знаков, разметки, светофоров, дорожных ограждений и направляющих устройств
Armenia	Հայաստանի հանրապետության Ճանապարհային երթեվեկության կանոնները եվ տրանսպորտային միջոցների շահագործումն արգելող անսարքությունների եվ պայմանների ցանկը հաստատելու մասին (Hayastani hanrapetut’yan Chanaparhayin yert’evekut’yan kanonnery yev transportayin mijots’neri shahagortsumn argelogh ansark’ut’yunneri yev paymanneri ts’anky hastatelu masin)
Azerbaijan	Azərbaycan Respublikası Yol Hərəkəti haqqında qanun, Yol nişanları
Belarus	СТБ 1140–2013 «Технические средства организации дорожного движения. Знаки дорожные. Общие технические условия» (in Russian) / СТБ 1140–2013 «Тэхнічныя сродкі арганізацыі дарожнага руху. Знакі дарожныя. Агульныя тэхнічныя ўмовы» (in Belarusian)
Estonia	Liiklusmärkide ja teemärgiste tähendused ning nõuded fooridele
Georgia	საგზაო მოძრაობის შესახებ (Sagzao modzraobis shesakheb)
Kazakhstan	СТ РК 1412–2017 «Технические средства регулирования дорожного движения. Правила применения» (in Russian) / ҚР СТ 1412–2017 «Жол қозғалысын ұйымдастырудың техникалық құралдары. Қолданылу ережелері» (in Kazakh), СТ РК 1125–2021 «Технические средства организации дорожного движения. Знаки дорожные. Общие технические требования» (in Russian) / ҚР СТ 1125–2021 «Жол қозғалысын ұйымдастырудың техникалық құралдары. Жол белгілері. Жалпы техникалық талаптар» (in Kazakh)
Kyrgyzstan	Правила дорожного движения (in Russian) / Жол кыймылынын эрежелери (in Kyrgyz), ГОСТ Р 52289-2019 Технические средства организации дорожного движения. Правила применения дорожных знаков, разметки, светофоров, дорожных ограждений и направляющих устройств
Latvia	LVS 77-1:2016 „Ceļa zīmes. 1. daļa: Ceļa zīmes”, LVS 77-2:2016 „Ceļa zīmes. 2. daļa: Uzstādīšanas noteikumi”, LVS 77-3:2016 „Ceļa zīmes. 3. daļa: Tehniskās prasības”
Lithuania	Dėl Kelių eismo taisyklių patvirtinimo
Republic of Moldova	Cu privire la aprobarea modificărilor și completărilor ce se operează în Regulamentul circulației rutiere
Tajikistan	Қоидаҳои ҳаракат дар роҳ
Turkmenistan	Ýol hereketi we howpsuzlygy
Ukraine	ДСТУ 4100:2021 Безпека дорожнього руху
Uzbekistan	Yoʻl harakati qoidalarini tasdiqlash toʻgʻrisida / Йўл ҳаракати қоидаларини тасдиқлаш тўғрисида

== Overview ==
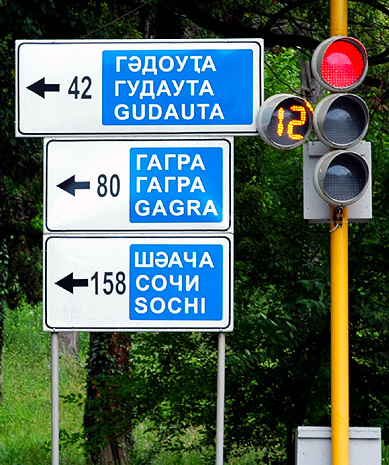
Trilingual road signs in Abkhazia, a partially recognised state. Inscriptions are in Abkhaz, Russian and English

There may be variations in the post-Soviet states' road signs despite the fact that many of them adopted the road sign system used in the Soviet Union prior to its dissolution in 1991. The main differences between traffic signs in post-Soviet states relate to:

- Graphic design details
- Local regulatory significance
- The colour-coding of directional signs
- Local language texts (in most post-Soviet states traffic signs can be bilingual or sometimes trilingual). In most post-Soviet states, the names of settlements and geographical objects can be written both in the country's official language and in English or in Latin script, mostly in countries that use non-Latin scripts in their official languages. Previously, the Soviet Union used primarily Russian on road signs, as well as the languages of the republics that were part of the USSR before they get an independence from the Soviet Union between 1990 and 1991. Below there are differences between local language texts in today's post-Soviet states:
  - Russia, Belarus, Kazakhstan, Kyrgyzstan, Tajikistan and Ukraine (including territories occupied by Russia since 2014 during the Russo-Ukrainian War and the subsequent 2022 Russian invasion of Ukraine) mostly use Cyrillic script on road signs. Armenia and Georgia use Armenian and Georgian scripts on road signs respectively. Cyrillic script is also used on road signs in territories of post-Soviet states occupied by Russia: the unrecognised Transnistria (a result of the Transnistria War in 1990–1992), partially recognised Donetsk People's Republic, Luhansk People's Republic (a result of the War in Donbas in 2014–2022), Abkhazia and South Ossetia (a result of the wars in Abkhazia in 1992–1993 and 1998, the 1991–1992 South Ossetia War and the 2008 Russo-Georgian War).
    - Road signs in Abkhazia are trilingual: Abkhaz, Russian and English.
  - Azerbaijan, Estonia, Latvia, Lithuania, Moldova, Turkmenistan and Uzbekistan mainly or solely use Latin script on road signs since their official languages use Latin script. Azerbaijan, Moldova, Turkmenistan and Uzbekistan, which previously used Cyrillic script in their official languages, switched to Latin script in the 1990s after the collapse of the USSR. Recently, in Kazakhstan, as part of its possible shift to the Latin alphabet in Kazakh, the Latin script on road signs is actively used.
- Number of categories of road signs ‒ the Soviet standard GOST 10807-78 divided signs into 7 categories, and this division was preserved in most post-Soviet states after the dissolution of the Soviet Union in 1991, in all countries except for Russia, Armenia and Kyrgyzstan who instead have 8 categories of road signs.

=== Typefaces ===
- Russia, Armenia, Azerbaijan, Belarus, Georgia, Kazakhstan, Lithuania, Moldova, Tajikistan, Turkmenistan, Ukraine and Uzbekistan use typefaces based on one specified in a Soviet standard GOST 10807–78. For example, in Belarus, the applicable standard is STB 1140–99; in Ukraine, it is DSTU 4100–2002; In Russia, it is GOST R 52290–2004; and in Kazakhstan, it is ST RK 1125–2002.
  - Russia, Azerbaijan, Belarus, Kazakhstan, Lithuania, Moldova, Tajikistan, Turkmenistan, Ukraine and Uzbekistan may use the Arial Bold typeface in road signs instead of the one specified in GOST 10807–78, especially in numerals on speed limit road signs, directional, and informatory signs. Also, the Helvetica typeface is sometimes used in road signs.
    - In Kazakhstan, the Helvetica typeface is sometimes used in directional road signs instead of Arial Bold.
  - Georgia uses the BalavMtavr and Arial Black typefaces on road signs.
  - Ukraine has recently started using the Road UA typeface, as part of a signage redesign.
  - Turkmenistan may also use the FHWA typeface as well as on road signs in Turkey since road signs in Turkmenistan may sometimes copy the Turkish road sign system.
- Estonia uses the Arial Narrow Bold typeface.
- Latvia uses the DIN 1451 typeface.

In all post-Soviet states, destinations on direction signs are written in capital letters, except for Ukraine's new road sign system, adopted in 2021.

=== Signs ===
==== Warning signs ====
In general, warning signs in post-Soviet states have a triangular shape with a red border and a white background, as in most European countries.

- Latvia uses warning signs with a thicker red triangle.
- Lithuania does not use the Tramway and Tram stop road sign due to the absence of tramways in its territory.

==== Road works and construction ====
- Road works and construction warning signs have a triangular shape with a red border and a white, amber, or yellow background. The Soviet Union formerly only used a white background on road works and construction warning signs. Today, only Armenia, Azerbaijan, Georgia, Kazakhstan, Kyrgyzstan, Latvia, and Lithuania still use a white background on these warning signs, while Russia, Belarus, Estonia, Tajikistan, Turkmenistan, Ukraine, and Uzbekistan only use an amber background, and Moldova uses a yellow background, like most temporary warning signs.

In Russia the yellow background was only introduced in 2013. In March 2023 the requirement was dropped for signs on portable stands.

==== Priority signs ====
- Armenia use both ԿԱՆԳ kang and STOP text in stop signs while most other post-Soviet states only use STOP text in stop signs regardless of the country's official language.
- Russia, Armenia, Azerbaijan, Belarus, Estonia, Georgia, Kazakhstan, Kyrgyzstan, Lithuania, Moldova, Tajikistan, Turkmenistan, Ukraine and Uzbekistan use End of priority road sign with 5 thin black diagonal lines.
- Russia, Armenia, Azerbaijan, Belarus, Georgia, Kazakhstan, Kyrgyzstan, Lithuania, Tajikistan and Turkmenistan, use Priority road and End of priority road signs with a rounded bright orange square and outlines with rounded corners.
- Estonia uses Priority road and End of priority road signs with a light yellow right-angle square and a right-angle square outline.
- Moldova and Ukraine use Priority road and End of priority road signs with a light rounded yellow square and outlines with rounded corners.
- Latvia uses a Give way sign with a thick red triangle, End of priority road sign with three thick black diagonal lines and light yellow square with right angles on it.
- Almost all post-Soviet states, except for Latvia and Georgia, use a long black arrow down and a short red arrow up on Give way to oncoming traffic signs, long white arrow up and a red short arrow down on Priority over oncoming traffic signs. Latvia has a different look on Give way to oncoming traffic and Priority over oncoming traffic signs so these signs look closer to the rest of Europe. Georgia also uses the similar arrows like in Latvia on the Give way to oncoming traffic and the Priority over oncoming traffic signs.

==== Prohibitory signs ====
Most prohibitory signs use a red circle or a red circle with a slash, as in the rest of Europe.

- Latvia uses prohibitory signs with a thick red circle.

In most post-Soviet states, most signs prohibiting certain types of vehicles carry a blanket exemption for local traffic that needs to access a building or property within the sign's area. Exempted vehicles are usually only allowed to enter or leave the area at the nearest intersection. Supplementary plates (detailing specific users that are exempt) are not normally used, unlike most other countries.
For example, in Russia, the "No Vehicles" sign does not apply to mail delivery vehicles, transit vehicles, vehicles serving industries or citizens, vehicles belonging to citizens living or working within the sign's area, or vehicles driven by or carrying disabled persons if the vehicle is displaying a "disabled" badge. This was once reflected in the sign's name, it was originally called "No Through Traffic" in the Soviet traffic regulations.
The traffic regulations of Belarus allow for a plate "with concise wording and an unambiguous interpretation" to be used alongside a sign, with the permission of the traffic police. It used to be common for a No Entry sign to have such a plate below. Nowadays, the "No Vehicles" sign alone is preferred.
Transit vehicles are exempt from No Entry signs if their route passes through them. Some bus lanes in Moscow have a "No Entry" sign above them to reserve them for city buses only.

==== Mandatory signs ====
- Road signs Turn right and Turn left use a 90-degree arrow or a straight arrow to the right and left, respectively. The Soviet Union formerly used a straight arrow to the right and left for Turn right and Turn left signs, respectively. Today, most post-Soviet states, with the exception of Azerbaijan, Lithuania and Turkmenistan only use the 90-degree arrow for Turn Right and Turn Left signs. However, the straight-arrow variant of these road signs may still be used in most post-Soviet states. In accordance with ГОСТ Р 52290-2004 in Russia and in other post-Soviet states, images of the signs Turn right and Turn left have been changed since 2006. In Ukraine, since April 2013, images of Turn right and Turn left signs have been modified by replacing straight arrows with 90-degree ones.
  - Estonia and Latvia use both straight and 90-degree arrows for Turn Right and Turn Left signs.
  - Azerbaijan, Lithuania and Turkmenistan continue to use the straight arrow for Turn Right and Turn Left signs, as they did during the Soviet era.

==== Special regulations signs ====
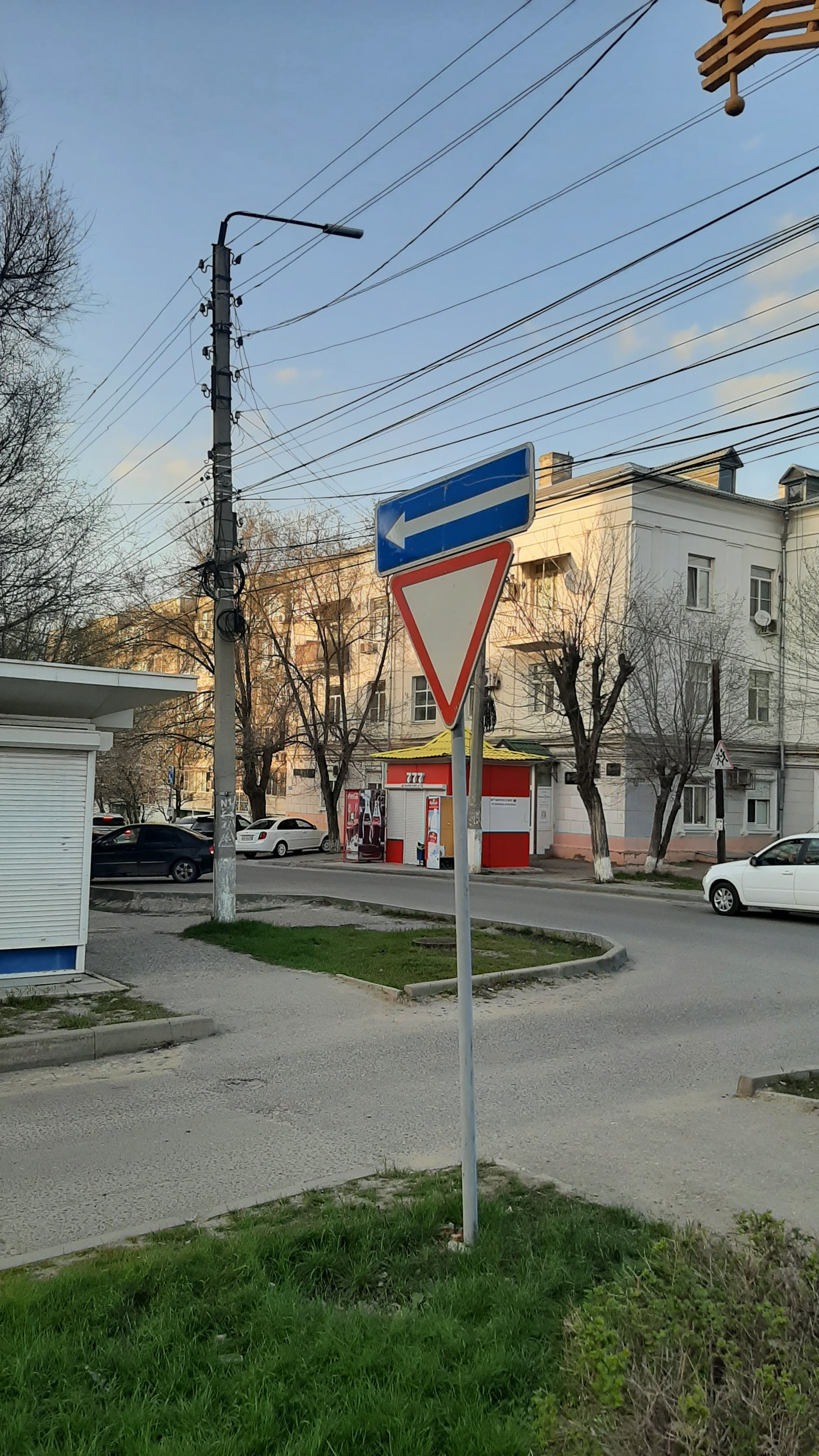
Give way sign and a rectangular one-way traffic sign. This combination of these signs is very widespread in the post-Soviet states.

- In all post-Soviet states, a rectangular road sign with a long white arrow pointing right or left on a blue background designates the exit to a one-way road on road junctions. The arrow on the sign shows the direction of one-way traffic and prohibits movement opposite to the direction of the arrow. Unlike most European countries, rectangular one-way road signs are only placed in front of intersections. At T-junctions, these signs are installed at the exit from a secondary road to the main one-way road, most often in conjunction with a Give way traffic sign or sometimes with a Stop sign, whereas other European countries use Turn right ( and/or) or Turn left ( and/or) signs at these T-junctions. Additionally, this rectangular road sign can be installed at the X-junctions with a one-way road in conjunction with the Priority road or Give way sign. In the rest of Europe, road signs Go straight or turn right, Go straight or turn left or No left turn, No right turn are often installed in front of X-junctions with one-way roads.
  - Moldova uses a different version of a rectangular one-way road sign with the SENS UNIC text in black inside the arrow , likewise in Romania , but it has a smaller SENS UNIC text compared to the Romanian one.
- In post-Soviet states, the sign indicating the end of a one-way road has a crossed-out up arrow inside the square. However, Lithuania uses a different sign to mark the end of a one-way road, and is only used if a one-way road meets a two-way road at an intersection. The Lithuanian sign has an up arrow on the right and a down arrow on the left. Signs marking the end of a one-way road are not found anywhere else in Europe and Asia in this form.
- Russia, Armenia, Azerbaijan, Belarus, Georgia, Kazakhstan, Kyrgyzstan, Lithuania, Tajikistan, Turkmenistan, Uzbekistan and Ukraine use a green background on the Motorway sign. Lithuania formerly used only green background on the Motorway sign; now it uses both green and blue background on the Motorway sign, which makes it the only post-Soviet state to use both green and blue background on the highway sign and at the same time one of the few countries in Europe to use these two background colors on this sign.
  - Estonia uses a blue background on the Motorway sign as other European countries do, but no roads fall under motorway regulations and it is not used.
  - Latvia did not have a Motorway road sign due to the absence of motorways in its territory. However, with the completion of the Ķekava bypass on 23 October 2023, Latvia uses the limited-access road sign for Motorways, making it the first Motorway in the country.
  - It was already that:
    - Lithuania does not use the Tramway and Tram stop road sign due to the absence of tramways in its territory.
  - Lithuania has updated their pedestrian crossing signs, which now look like this:.
- Most post-Soviet states use the red cross on Hospital and First aid road signs, while Belarus uses the green cross instead, and Tajikistan uses the red crescent as well as in other Muslim countries. From 2002 to 2021, Ukraine formerly used a white cross inside a green square on these medicine-related road signs.

==== Indication signs ====
- Kilometer signs are used to indicate the distance from the place of its installation to the start or end point of the road and are set after 1 km. Such signs usually have from one to four digits. A maximum of 4 digits on kilometer signs are used on highways in Russia and Central Asian countries, whose length exceeds 1000 kilometers, due to the huge area of these countries. In the Baltic States, Belarus, Ukraine, Moldova, Azerbaijan, Armenia and Georgia, a maximum of 3 digits are used on kilometer signs.

== Table of traffic signs comparison ==
=== Priority ===
	Soviet Union	Armenia	Azerbaijan	Belarus	(Estonia)	(Georgia (country))	Kazakhstan	(Kyrgyzstan)	Latvia	(Lithuania)	Moldova	(Russia)	Tajikistan	(Turkmenistan)	(Ukraine)	Uzbekistan
	Soviet Union	Armenia	Azerbaijan	Belarus	Estonia	Georgia	Kazakhstan	Kyrgyzstan	Latvia	Lithuania	Moldova	Russia	Tajikistan	Turkmenistan	Ukraine	Uzbekistan
Stop																
Give Way																
Priority road																
End of priority road																
Give way to oncoming traffic																
Priority over oncoming traffic																
Stop ahead																
Give Way ahead																
	Soviet Union	Armenia	Azerbaijan	Belarus	Estonia	Georgia	Kazakhstan	Kyrgyzstan	Latvia	Lithuania	Moldova	Russia	Tajikistan	Turkmenistan	Ukraine	Uzbekistan

=== Warning ===
	Soviet Union	Armenia	Azerbaijan	Belarus	Estonia	Georgia	Kazakhstan	Kyrgyzstan	Latvia	Lithuania	Moldova	Russia	Tajikistan	Turkmenistan	Ukraine	Uzbekistan
Curve																
Series of curves																
Crossroads (with priority to the right)																
Crossroads (with a minor road)																
Roundabout																
Traffic signals																
Two-way traffic																
Traffic queues																
Steep ascent																
Steep descent																
	Soviet Union	Armenia	Azerbaijan	Belarus	Estonia	Georgia	Kazakhstan	Kyrgyzstan	Latvia	Lithuania	Moldova	Russia	Tajikistan	Turkmenistan	Ukraine	Uzbekistan
Pedestrian crossing																
Pedestrians																
Children																
Cyclists																
Domesticated animals																
Wild animals																
Road narrows																
Uneven surface																
Bump																
Dip																
	Soviet Union	Armenia	Azerbaijan	Belarus	Estonia	Georgia	Kazakhstan	Kyrgyzstan	Latvia	Lithuania	Moldova	Russia	Tajikistan	Turkmenistan	Ukraine	Uzbekistan
Slippery surface																
End of paved surface																
Loose surface material																
Soft or low verges																
Falling rocks																
Crosswinds																
Unprotected body of water																
Opening bridge																
Tunnel																
Low-flying aircraft																
	Soviet Union	Armenia	Azerbaijan	Belarus	Estonia	Georgia	Kazakhstan	Kyrgyzstan	Latvia	Lithuania	Moldova	Russia	Tajikistan	Turkmenistan	Ukraine	Uzbekistan
Accident																
Blind spot																
Trams																
Level crossing with barriers ahead																
Level crossing without barriers ahead																
Level crossing (single track)																
Level crossing (multiple tracks)																
Roadworks																
Other danger																
	Soviet Union	Armenia	Azerbaijan	Belarus	Estonia	Georgia	Kazakhstan	Kyrgyzstan	Latvia	Lithuania	Moldova	Russia	Tajikistan	Turkmenistan	Ukraine	Uzbekistan

Note: in most post-Soviet states, crossroads warning signs, including those in Russia and the CIS countries, are classified as priority signs, despite the fact that these signs have a shape typical of warning signs in European countries.

=== Prohibitory ===
	Soviet Union	Armenia	Azerbaijan	Belarus	Estonia	Georgia	Kazakhstan	Kyrgyzstan	Latvia	Lithuania	Moldova	Russia	Tajikistan	Turkmenistan	Ukraine	Uzbekistan
No entry																
No vehicles																
No motor vehicles																
No motorcycles																
No mopeds																
No pedal cycles																
No heavy goods vehicles																
No buses																
No vehicles pulling a trailer																
	Soviet Union	Armenia	Azerbaijan	Belarus	Estonia	Georgia	Kazakhstan	Kyrgyzstan	Latvia	Lithuania	Moldova	Russia	Tajikistan	Turkmenistan	Ukraine	Uzbekistan
No agricultural vehicles																
No animal-drawn vehicles																
No vehicles carrying dangerous goods																
No vehicles carrying explosives or inflammables																
No vehicles carrying water pollutants																
Height limit																
Width limit																
Length limit																
Weight limit																
Weight limit per axle																
	Soviet Union	Armenia	Azerbaijan	Belarus	Estonia	Georgia	Kazakhstan	Kyrgyzstan	Latvia	Lithuania	Moldova	Russia	Tajikistan	Turkmenistan	Ukraine	Uzbekistan
No stopping																
No parking																
Customs																
Police																
Danger																
Control																
No right turn																
No left turn																
No U-turn																
No overtaking																
No overtaking by heavy goods vehicles																
Minimum following distance between vehicles																
No honking																
No pedestrians																
	Soviet Union	Armenia	Azerbaijan	Belarus	Estonia	Georgia	Kazakhstan	Kyrgyzstan	Latvia	Lithuania	Moldova	Russia	Tajikistan	Turkmenistan	Ukraine	Uzbekistan
Speed limit																
Speed limit zone																
	Soviet Union	Armenia	Azerbaijan	Belarus	Estonia	Georgia	Kazakhstan	Kyrgyzstan	Latvia	Lithuania	Moldova	Russia	Tajikistan	Turkmenistan	Ukraine	Uzbekistan

=== Mandatory ===
	Soviet Union	Armenia	Azerbaijan	Belarus	Estonia	Georgia	Kazakhstan	Kyrgyzstan	Latvia	Lithuania	Moldova	Russia	Tajikistan	Turkmenistan	Ukraine	Uzbekistan
Go straight																
Turn right																
Go straight or turn right																
Turn left or right																
Roundabout																
Keep right																
May pass on either side																
Minimum speed limit																
Route for motor vehicles																
Route for vehicles carrying dangerous goods																
	Soviet Union	Armenia	Azerbaijan	Belarus	Estonia	Georgia	Kazakhstan	Kyrgyzstan	Latvia	Lithuania	Moldova	Russia	Tajikistan	Turkmenistan	Ukraine	Uzbekistan
Footpath																
Cycle path																
Shared pedestrian and cycle path																
Segregated pedestrian and cycle path																
Bridle path																
	Soviet Union	Armenia	Azerbaijan	Belarus	Estonia	Georgia	Kazakhstan	Kyrgyzstan	Latvia	Lithuania	Moldova	Russia	Tajikistan	Turkmenistan	Ukraine	Uzbekistan

=== Special regulations ===
	Soviet Union	Armenia	Azerbaijan	Belarus	Estonia	Georgia	Kazakhstan	Kyrgyzstan	Latvia	Lithuania	Moldova	Russia	Tajikistan	Turkmenistan	Ukraine	Uzbekistan
One-way traffic																
Bus lane																
Contra-flow bus lane																
Pedestrian crossing																
Blind pedestrian crossing																
Diagonal pedestrian crossing																
Speed bump																
Residential area																
Pedestrian zone																
Tunnel																
Limited-access road																
Motorway																
	Soviet Union	Armenia	Azerbaijan	Belarus	Estonia	Georgia	Kazakhstan	Kyrgyzstan	Latvia	Lithuania	Moldova	Russia	Tajikistan	Turkmenistan	Ukraine	Uzbekistan

=== Indication ===
	Soviet Union	Armenia	Azerbaijan	Belarus	Estonia	Georgia	Kazakhstan	Kyrgyzstan	Latvia	Lithuania	Moldova	Russia	Tajikistan	Turkmenistan	Ukraine	Uzbekistan
No through road																
Hospital																
First aid																
Bus stop																
Tram stop																
Taxi stand																
Parking																
Parking garage																
U-turn area																
U-turn zone																
Reversible lane																
	Soviet Union	Armenia	Azerbaijan	Belarus	Estonia	Georgia	Kazakhstan	Kyrgyzstan	Latvia	Lithuania	Moldova	Russia	Tajikistan	Turkmenistan	Ukraine	Uzbekistan
Advisory speed																
Detour																
Truck route																
Stop line																
Escape lane																
Lane configuration																
Kilometre marker																
	Soviet Union	Armenia	Azerbaijan	Belarus	Estonia	Georgia	Kazakhstan	Kyrgyzstan	Latvia	Lithuania	Moldova	Russia	Tajikistan	Turkmenistan	Ukraine	Uzbekistan

Note: in most post-Soviet states, the "U-turn area" and "U-turn zone" signs prohibit left turns, despite being classed as "indication" signs.

=== De-restriction ===
	Soviet Union	Armenia	Azerbaijan	Belarus	Estonia	Georgia	Kazakhstan	Kyrgyzstan	Latvia	Lithuania	Moldova	Russia	Tajikistan	Turkmenistan	Ukraine	Uzbekistan
End of speed limit																
End of speed limit zone																
End of no overtaking																
End of no overtaking by heavy goods vehicles																
End of all previously signed restrictions																
End of minimum speed limit																
End of cycle path																
End of one-way traffic																
End of bus lane																
End of residential area																
End of reversible lane																
End of limited-access road																
End of motorway																
	Soviet Union	Armenia	Azerbaijan	Belarus	Estonia	Georgia	Kazakhstan	Kyrgyzstan	Latvia	Lithuania	Moldova	Russia	Tajikistan	Turkmenistan	Ukraine	Uzbekistan

=== Built-up area limits ===
Under the Vienna Convention the begin and end built-up area signs imply a change between built-up area and rural traffic rules including speed limit. In most post-Soviet states, road signs with the locality name and the object, including river names, on a white or blue background are used. Road signs with the name of the built-up areas on a white background indicate the entrance of the built-up areas, where the maximum speed limit inside them is introduced. Road signs indicating leaving built-up areas on a white background remove the maximum speed limit inside built-up areas and introduce a maximum speed limit outside built-up areas instead. Road signs with the name of the locality on a blue background inform drivers that their car route does not pass through the locality itself, but only through its most remote part. Such signs are not used in Moldova.

In Lithuania, road signs may indicate both the end of a built-up area or locality with its name and the nearest built-up area or locality with an indication of the distance.

In Belarus and Lithuania, road signs with the names of the built-up areas in may also feature a building silhouette.

In Estonia, road signs with the names of the built-up areas on a white background display both their name and building silhouette, or only the building silhouette.

In Armenia and Georgia, road signs with the names of settlements are in two languages: Armenian and English in Armenia, and Georgian and English in Georgia, due to the fact that these countries use scripts other than Cyrillic and Latin in their official languages.

In Ukraine, in accordance with the new road sign standard DSTU 4100:2021, the names of settlements are written in Cyrillic and Latin.

In Moldova, there is a slightly different version of the road sign indicating the entrance of built-up areas: on top, it has the building silhouette on the right and a sign indicating the maximum speed limit on the left, or only the building silhouette in the center, on a yellow background, and on the bottom, it has the name of the built-up area on a white background, similar to Romania.

	Soviet Union	Armenia	Azerbaijan	Belarus	Estonia	Georgia	Kazakhstan	Kyrgyzstan	Latvia	Lithuania	Moldova	Russia	Tajikistan	Turkmenistan	Ukraine	Uzbekistan
Entrance to built-up area		or		or	or		or	or	or	or or	or	or	or		or	
Leaving built-up area		or		or	or		or	or	or	or or	or	or	or		or	
Entrance to locality																
Leaving locality																
	Soviet Union	Armenia	Azerbaijan	Belarus	Estonia	Georgia	Kazakhstan	Kyrgyzstan	Latvia	Lithuania	Moldova	Russia	Tajikistan	Turkmenistan	Ukraine	Uzbekistan

=== Border crossing ===
The table below shows road signs with the name of the country at the entrance to their territory and the countries' general speed limits. Such signs are installed only at the entrance to the country. The maximum speed limit when driving on roads in built-up areas, outside built-up areas and on highways in post-Soviet states may vary depending on their traffic regulations, which establish general speed limits. Most post-Soviet states use border road signs with the names of the countries that display their flag and/or coat of arms. Estonia, Latvia and Lithuania use border road signs with the name of the country and 12 stars on a blue background, since these countries are European Union members. However, unlike most European Union countries, Estonia has a border road sign with the coat of arms on the left, the 12 stars of the European Union on the right, and the country names EESTI VABARIIK and REPUBLIC OF ESTONIA in Estonian and English, respectively, in the center.

	Armenia	Belarus	Estonia	Georgia	Kazakhstan	Kyrgyzstan	Latvia	Lithuania	Moldova	Russia	Tajikistan	Ukraine
Border sign												
General speed limits												

== Breakaway states ==
Road signs used in unrecognized and partially recognized states formed on the territory of the former Soviet Union such as Transnistria, Abkhazia and South Ossetia are generally modeled on those used in modern Russia.

=== Transnistria ===
Road signs in Transnistria are regulated by the Republic's standards GOST R 52289-2009 and GOST R 52290-2009, which are entirely based on the Russian standards.

== See also ==
- Comparison of European road signs
- Traffic sign
- Vienna Convention on Road Signs and Signals
