= Road signs in Kazakhstan =

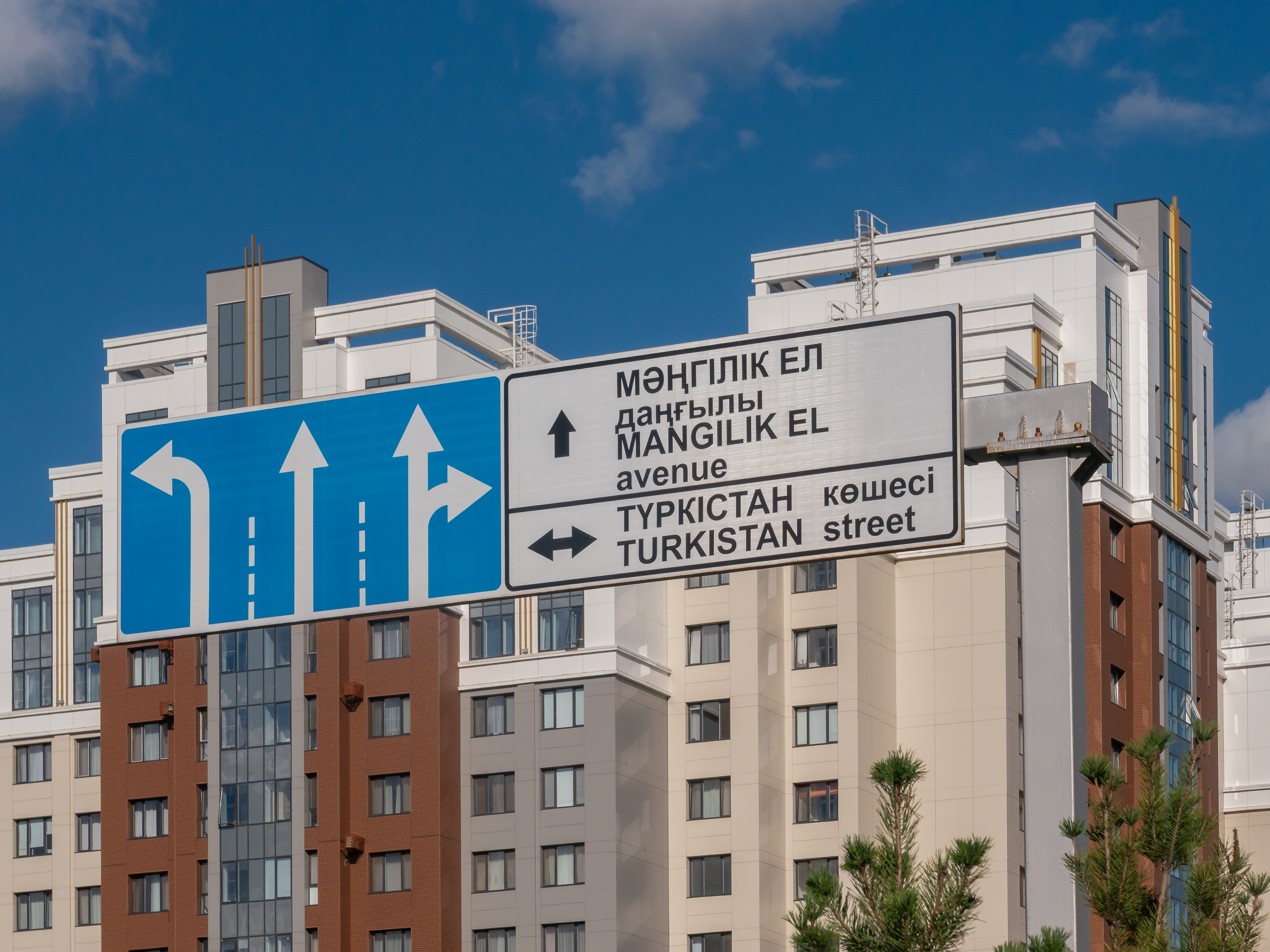
Bilingual sign in the capital city of Astana

Road signs in Kazakhstan are similar to the road sign system of other post-Soviet states that ensure that transport vehicles move safely and orderly, as well as to inform the participants of traffic built-in graphic icons. These icons are governed by the Vienna Convention on Road Traffic and Vienna Convention on Road Signs and Signals. Road signs are regulated by the ST RK 1125-2021 standard.

Road signs in Kazakhstan are in many ways similar to road signs used in neighboring Russia and derived from the Soviet GOST 10807-78 (no longer valid in Russia since January 1, 2006), modern Russian GOST R 52290-2004 and Belarusian STB 1140-2013 standards as well as in the countries of the Eurasian Economic Union. However, ST RK 1125-2021 has some differences from its Russian counterpart GOST R 52290-2004:

- Inscriptions on road signs are written in Kazakh and/or Russian in accordance with the official languages of Kazakhstan. Due to the fact that since 2017 Kazakhstan is preparing to switch from Cyrillic to Latin script, inscriptions on road signs in Kazakh, including the settlement names, may be written in Latin script instead of Cyrillic;
- Number of categories: While Russia has 8 categories of road signs according to GOST R 52290-2004, Kazakhstan has 7 categories. This is because road signs in the Soviet Union were divided into 7 categories in accordance with GOST 10807-78, and this division was preserved in most post-Soviet states after the dissolution of the Soviet Union in 1991, namely the Commonwealth of Independent States countries, Georgia and Ukraine;
- Presence of road signs specific for Kazakhstan but not used in Russia and any other post-Soviet states.

On January 1, 2004, the Kazakh state standard for road signs ST RK 1125-2002 came into force in Kazakhstan to replace the GOST 10807-78 standard that had been in force since Soviet times.

The official typeface of road signs in Kazakhstan is based on GOST 10807-78. However, Arial is often de facto used on road signs in Kazakhstan instead, similar to neighboring Russia and most other post-Soviet states.

== Warning signs ==
Railroad crossing ahead

Locomotive railroad crossing ahead

Single track railroad crossing

Doubletipel track railroad crossing

Level crossing countdown

Level crossing countdown

Level crossing countdown

Level crossing countdown

Level crossing countdown

Level crossing countdown

Tramway

Crossroads without priority

Traffic circle

Traffic light

Opening bridge

Riverbank ahead

Bend to the right

Bend to the left

Double bend, first to the right

Double bend, first to the left

Steep descent

Steep climb

Slippery road when wet

Bumpy road

Bump

Loose gravel

Road narrows on both sides

Road narrows on right side

Road narrows on left side

Two-way traffic

Pedestrian crossing

School zone

Bike crossing

Roadworks area

Domestic cattle crossing

Deer crossing

Rock slide area

Sidewinds

Low-flying aircraft

Tunnel

Be careful

Hazard chevron

Hazard chevron

Hazard chevron

Hazard chevron (yellow)

Hazard chevron (yellow)

Obstacle detour to the right

Obstacle detour to the left

Obstacle detour to the right or left

Dangerous roadside

Traffic jam

== Priority signs ==
Intersection road

End of intersection road

Crossroads with priority

Side road with priority, from the right

Side road with priority, from the left

Oblique side road with priority, from the right

Oblique side road with priority, from the left

Merging traffic, from the right

Merging traffic, from the left

Yield

Stop

Yield to oncoming traffic

Priority over oncoming traffic

== Prohibitory signs ==
Entry prohibited

Traffic prohibited

No motor vehicles

No lorries

No motorcycles

No tractors

No vehicles with trailer

No horse-drawn carts

No cycling

No pedestrians

Vehicle weight limit

Weight per axle limit

Height limit

Width limit

Length limit

Minimum distance limit

Customs

Danger

Control

No right turn

No left turn

No U-turn

No overtaking

End of overtaking restriction

No overtaking by lorries

End of overtaking by lorries restriction

Maximum speed limit

End of maximum speed limit

No beeping

No stopping

No parking

No parking on odd days of the month

No parking on even days of the month

End of all restrictions

No vehicles with dangerous goods

No vehicles with explosive and flammable loads

== Mandatory signs ==
Go straight

Go right

Turn right

Go left

Turn left

Go straight or right

Go straight or left

Go right or left

Keep on the right

Keep on the left

Keep on the right left may pass either side sign

Direction of roundabout traffic

Cars only

Cycle path

End of a cycle path

Footpath

Shared-use path

End of shared-use path

Segregated pedestrian and cycle path

Segregated pedestrian and cycle path

End of segregated pedestrian and cycle path

End of segregated pedestrian and cycle path

Minimum speed limit

End of minimum speed limit

Direction of movement of vehicles with dangerous goods

Direction of movement of vehicles with dangerous goods

Direction of movement of vehicles with dangerous goods

== Information signs ==
Motorway

End of motorway

Road for cars

End of road for cars

One-way road

End of one-way road

Exit to a one-way road

Exit to a one-way road

Road with a contra

Added lane

Added lane

Added lane

Maximum speed limits per lane

Bus stop

Tram stop

Pedestrian crossing left

Pedestrian crossing right

Diagonal pedestrian crossing

Road bump

Entrance to built-up area

Entrance to built-up area (cityscape)

End of built-up area

End of built-up area (cityscape)

Entrance to locality

End of locality

Advisory speed

Parking lot

Pedestrian subway

Footbridge

Dead end

Dead end on right

Dead end on left

Traffic scheme

Kilometre sign

Route number (blue)

Route number (green)

Stop line

General speed limits

Emergency stopping lane

Dual carriageway (from right to left)

Dual carriageway (from left to right)

Reversible lane

End of reversible lane

Reversible lane

Residential area

End of residential area

Photo- and video traffic enforcement camera

Speed bump

No parking zone

End of no parking zone

Maximum speed limit zone

End of maximum speed limit zone

Pedestrian zone

End of pedestrian zone

Zone with restriction of ecological class of motor vehicles

End of zone with restriction of ecological class of motor vehicles

== Service signs ==
Point of medical care

Hospital

Gas station

Vehicle maintenance

Car washing

Phone

Food point

Drinking water

Hotel or motel

Camping

Place of rest

Traffic police post

Police

Transport control point

Customs control point

Reception area of a radio station transmitting traffic information

Radio communication area with emergency services

Pool or beach

Toilet

Emergency telephone number

Fire extinguisher

Gas station with possibility of charging electric vehicles

Ecological control

== Additional panels ==
Distance to the object

Distance to the object

Distance to the object

Distance to the object

Coverage area

Coverage area

Coverage area

Coverage area

Coverage area

Coverage area

Directions of action

Directions of action

Directions of action

Trucks only

Trailers only

Cars only

Buses only

Tractors only

Motorcycles only

Bicycles only

Hazardous goods vehicles only

Tourist bus

Except trucks

Except cars

Except buses

Except motorcycles

Except bicycles

Except taxis

Saturdays, Sundays and holidays

Working days

Days of the week

Validity period

Validity period

Validity period

Validity period

Method of parking the vehicle

Method of parking the vehicle

Method of parking the vehicle

Method of parking the vehicle

Method of parking the vehicle

Method of parking the vehicle

Method of parking the vehicle

Method of parking the vehicle

Method of parking the vehicle

Parking with an idle engine

Paid services

Limitation of parking duration

Place for car inspection

Limitation of the permitted maximum mass

Direction of the main road

Traffic lane

Blind pedestrians

Wet coating

Disabled people

Except for the disabled

Dangerous goods class

Type of route vehicle

Type of route vehicle

The tow truck is working

Environmental class of the vehicle

Charging electric vehicles

Except for charging electric vehicles

== See also ==
- Comparison of traffic signs in post-Soviet states
