= Road signs in Estonia =

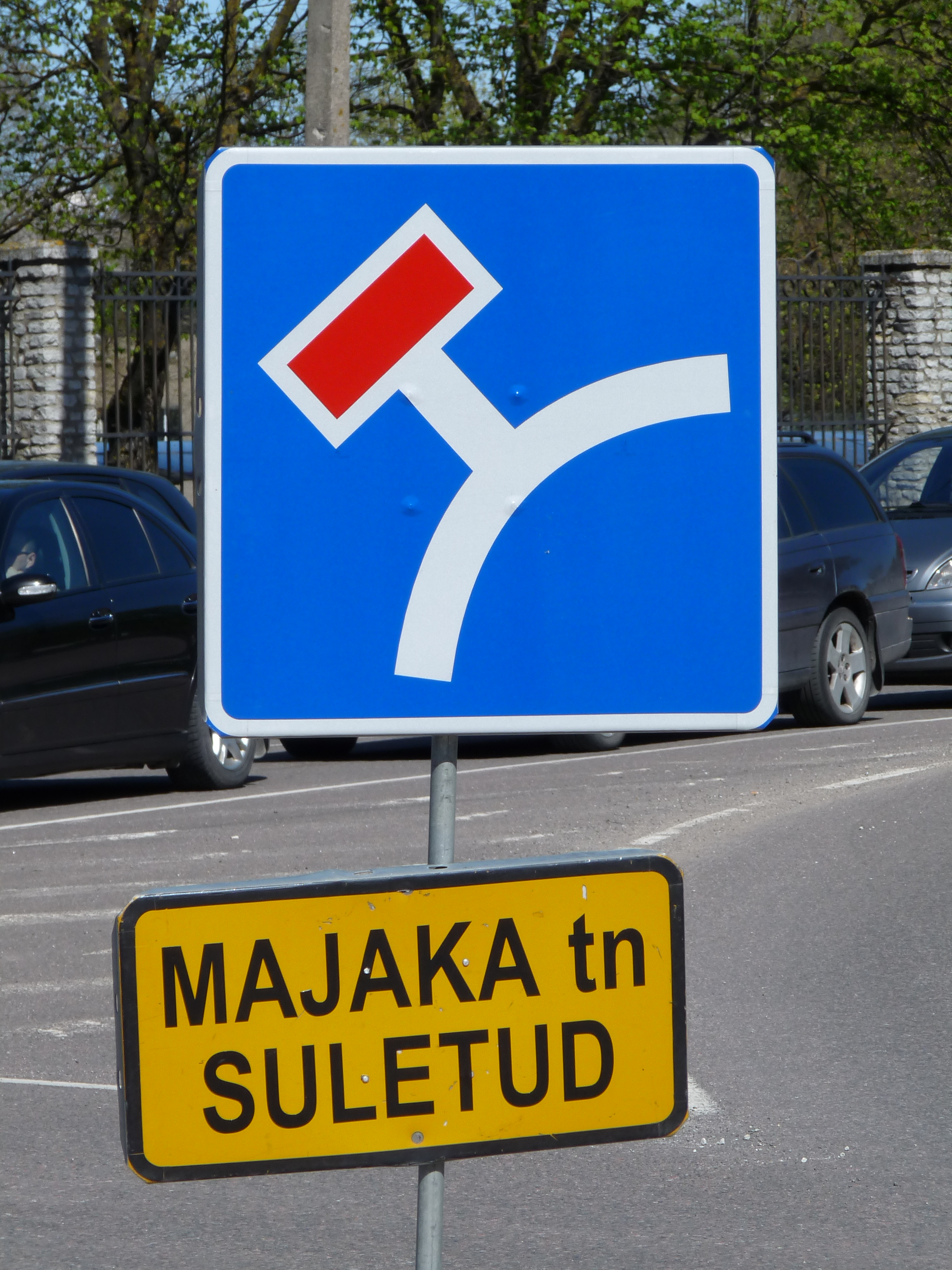
Dead end road sign in Tallinn.

Road signs in Estonia are regulated in the Meanings of traffic signs and road markings and requirements for traffic lights (Estonian: Liiklusmärkide ja teemärgiste tähendused ning nõuded fooridele) and the standards document EVS 613:2001 Traffic signs.

Estonia is a signatory to the Vienna Convention on Road Signs and Signals, having acceded to it on 24 August 1992.

As part of the former Soviet Union, Estonia had used the Soviet road sign standard. After gaining independence, a new standard was introduced, departing from the Soviet standard still in use elsewhere today.

== Warning signs ==
Level crossing with gates

Level crossing without gates

Single track level crossing

Multitrack level crossing

Countdown to railway crossing 300m

Countdown to railway crossing 200m

Countdown to railway crossing 100m

Tramway

Equal roads intersection

Secondary road junction

Secondary road junction on right

Secondary road junction on left

Roundabout ahead

Traffic signals

Quayside or riverbank

Curve to left

Double curve first to left

Curve to right

Double curve first to right

Steep descent

Steep ascent

Slippery road

Uneven road

Dip

Road for bump

Loose gravel

Gauge

Soft shoulder

Roadworks

Road narrows on both sides

Road narrows on right

Road narrows on left

Two-way traffic

Two-way traffic crossing

Speed breaker

Pedestrian crossing ahead

Pedestrians

Children

Elderly people

Bicycle crossing

Skiers crossing

Equestrian crossing

Watch for cattle

Watch for wild horses

Watch for moose

Watch for ducks

Watch for frogs

Unpaved road ahead

Falling unstable rocks

Side winds

Low-flying aircraft

Traffic jams

Ice

Other dangers

Accident

== Priority signs ==
Priority road

End of priority road

Give way

Stop

Give way to oncoming vehicles

Priority over oncoming vehicles

== Prohibitory signs ==
No entry

Road closed to all vehicles

No motor vehicles except motorcycles

No motorcycles

No buses

No goods vehicles over 8 tons

No snowmobiles

No tractors

No vehicles with trailers over 20 tons

No dangerous goods

No pedal cycles

No mopeds

No ridden horses

No pedestrians

No right turn

No left turn

No U-turns

Customs

Police

Other control

One axle weight limit

Tandem axle weight limit

Height limit

Width limit

Length limit

Laden weight limit

No overtaking

No overtaking by lorries

Minimum distance

No honking/audible noise

No stopping

No parking

No parking on odd days

No parking on even days

End of overtaking prohibition

End of overtaking by lorries prohibition

Speed limit

End of speed limit

End of all restrictions

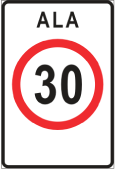
Speed limit zone

No stopping zone

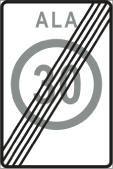
End of speed limit zone

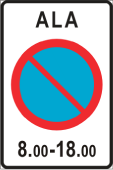
Controlled zone

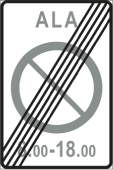
End of controlled zone

== Mandatory signs ==
Go straight

Turn right ahead

Turn right

Straight or turn right

Turn left or right

Keep right

Pass either side

Roundabout

Bikeway

Footpath

Segregated path

Segregated path

Shared path

Equestrian path

Snowmobile path

Snow chain

Minimum speed limit

End of minimum speed limit

Pedestrian zone

Direction for vehicles with dangerous goods

== Special regulation signs ==
Highway

Highway ends

One-way traffic

One-way traffic

End of one-way traffic

Bus line

Bus line ends

Contra-flow bus lane

Contra-flow bus lane

Contra-flow bus lane

Contra-flow bus lane ends

Lane direction

Added line

Lane direction

Added line

Line ends

Bus stop

Tram stop

Pedestrian crossing

Pedestrian underpass

Pedestrian overpass

At-grade pedestrian railway crossing

U-turn permitted

Dead end

Passing place

Recommended speed

Emergency lay-by in the tunnel

Reversible road

Reversible road ends

Reversible road entry

Built-up area

Built-up area

End of built-up area

End of built-up area

Residential area

End of residential area

Parking

Tunnel

End of tunnel

Stop line

General speed limits

== Information signs ==
Traffic guide

Advance warning of an intersection

Advance warning of an intersection with restrictions

Direction sign indicating a diversion by category

Advance direction sign on a rural road

Advance direction sign for a tourist destination

Reassurance directional distance

Kilometric position

National road number

Secondary road number

European route number

Direction indicator for trucks

Direction indicator for trucks

Direction indicator for trucks

Advance direction sign indicating a detour

Lane closed for roadworks

Returning to the ward

Detour

Detour

Detour

Detour for pedestrians

Detour for pedestrians

Detour for pedestrians

Curve delineator panels

Curve delineator panels

Curve delineator panels

== Service signs ==
First aid or hospital

Police

Information post

Public telephone

Traffic information radio

Landmark

Customs office

Petrol station

Charging station

Repair service

Car wash

Washing facility

Covered parking

Restaurant

Cafe

Hotel or motel

Public restrooms

Portable toilets

Youth hostel

Camping

Bungalow

Caravan site

Rest place

Hiking trail

Beach or swimming pool

Bathing area

Fishing area

Sports ground

Sports hall

Golf course

Equestrian base

Shop

== Additional signs ==
Distance

Arrows of distance

Buses

Distance to a stop sign

Priority junction

Waiting time for red light

Tons

Handicap

Except buses

Accident

== Historic signs ==
=== 1938 road signs ===
Uneven road

Series of bends

Crossroad

Level crossing with barriers

Level crossing without barriers

Danger

Danger

Yield

Priority road

No vehicles

No entry

No motor vehicles except motorcycles

No motorcycles

No motor vehicles

No trucks

Weight limit

Motor vehicle weight limit

Speed limit

No overtaking

No honking

Width limit

Height limit

No stopping

No parking

Mandatory direction

Customs

Parking

Caution

First aid

== See also ==
- Comparison of European road signs
- Comparison of traffic signs in post-Soviet states
- Transport in Estonia
