= Road signs in Kyrgyzstan =

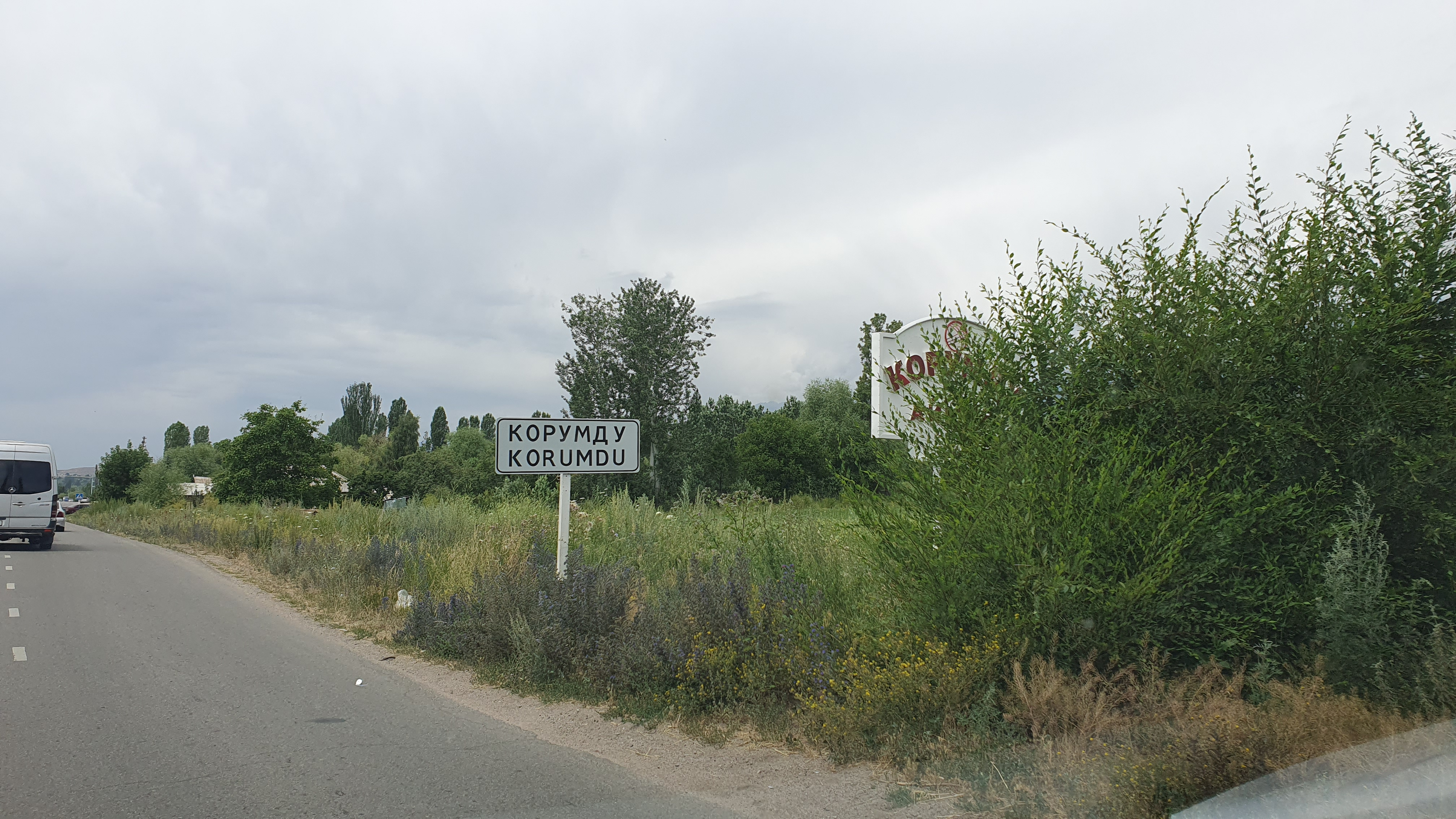
Road sign in Korumdu

Road signs in Kyrgyzstan are in many ways similar to road signs in Russia, as well as the road sign system of other post-Soviet states, as they are regulated by Russian standards GOST R 52289-2019 and GOST R 52290-2004 as well as the interstate standard GOST 32945-2014. The only exception is that inscriptions on road signs are in Kyrgyz and/or Russian, in accordance with the official languages of Kyrgyzstan.

Kyrgyzstan acceded to the Vienna Convention on Road Signs and Signals on 30 August 2006.

== Gallery ==
=== Warning signs ===
Railroad crossing ahead

Lokomotif railroad crossing ahead

Single track railroad crossing

Doubletipel track railroad crossing

Level crossing countdown

Countdown marker

Countdown marker

Countdown marker

Countdown marker

Countdown marker

Tramway

Crossroads without priority

Traffic circle

Traffic light

Opening bridge

Riverbank ahead

Bend to the right

Bend to the left

Double bend, first to the right

Double bend, first to the left

Steep descent

Steep climb

Slippery road when wet

Bumpy road

Bump

Loose gravel

Road narrow on both sides

Road narrow on right side

Road narrow on left side

Two-way traffic

Zebra crossing

School zone

Bike crossing

Roadworks area

Domestic animals crossing

Wild animals crossing

Landslide area

Sidewinds

Low-flying aircraft

Be careful

=== Priority signs ===
Priority road

End of priority road

Crossroads with priority

Side road with priority, from the right

Side road with priority, from the left

Oblique side road with priority, from the right

Oblique side road with priority, from the left

Merging traffic, from the right

Merging traffic, from the left

Yield

Stop

Yield to oncoming traffic

Priority over oncoming traffic

=== Prohibitory signs ===
Do not enter

Closed to all vehicles

No entry for cars

No entry for trucks

No motorbike

No entry for tractors

No entry for trailers

No entry for horses-drawn vehicles

No entry for bike

No entry for pedestrians

Weight limit

Axle weight limit

Height limit

Width limit

Length limit

Maximum separation

No right turn

No left turn

No U-turn

No overtaking

End of overtaking prohibition

No overtaking by trucks

End of overtaking prohibition by trucks

Maximum speed limit (20 km/h)

Maximum speed limit (30 km/h)

Maximum speed limit (40 km/h)

Maximum speed limit (50 km/h)

Maximum speed limit (60 km/h)

Maximum speed limit (70 km/h)

Maximum speed limit (80 km/h)

Maximum speed limit (90 km/h)

Maximum speed limit (100 km/h)

Maximum speed limit (110 km/h)

End of speed limit (50 km/h)

No audible warning devices

No stopping or standing

No parking or waiting

Alternate parking on odd days

Alternate parking on even days

End of all prohibitions

No entry for vehicles carrying dangerous goods

=== Mandatory signs ===
Go straight

Turn right

Turn left

Straight ahead or right turn permitted

Straight ahead or left turn permitted

Keep right

Keep left

Traffic circle

Bike path

Pedestrian path

Minimum speed limit

End of minimum speed limit

Proceed straight for vehicles carrying dangerous goods

Turn right for vehicles carrying dangerous goods

Turn left for vehicles carrying dangerous goods

=== Special regulation signs ===
Special regulation signs

Start of Expressway

End of expressway

Start of Motor vehicles road

End of motor vehicles road

One-way street

End of one-way street

One-way street

One-way street

Added lane

Added lane

Added lane

Maximum speed limits per lane

Bus stop

Tram stop

Crosswalk left

Crosswalk right

Road bump

Start of tunnel

End of tunnel

=== Information signs ===
General speed limits

Advisory speed

Parking lot

Pedestrian subway

Footbridge

Dead end

Dead end on right

Dead end on left

Traffic scheme

=== Service signs ===
Service signs

First aid post

Hospital

Petrol station

Workshop

Telephone general

Restaurant

Hotel or motel

Camping site

Park

=== Additional panels ===
Distance

Stop ahead

Side extension (of No stopping or No parking)

Side extension (of No stopping or No parking)

Length

Beginning (of No stopping or No parking)

Continuation (of No stopping or No parking)

Ending (of No stopping or No parking)

Direction of priority road

Wheelchair parking

== See also ==
- Traffic signs in post-Soviet states
