= Road signs in Romania =

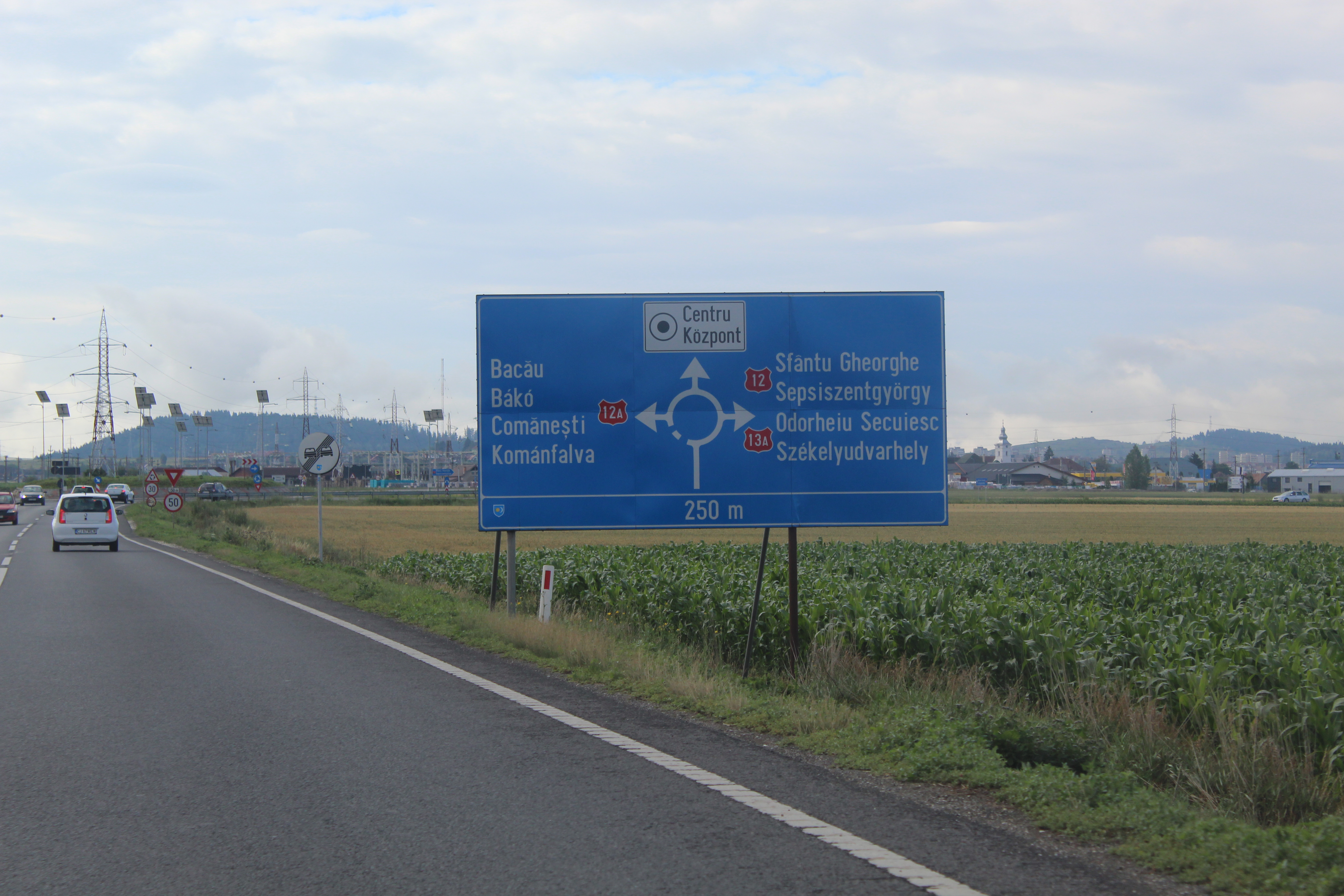
Bilingual (Romanian and Hungarian) roundabout sign in Miercurea Ciuc

Road signs in Romania are regulated in Regulation for the implementation of the Emergency Ordinance on traffic on public roads (Romanian: Regulamentul de aplicare a Ordonanţei de urgenţă privind circulaţia pe drumurile publice), in effect since 12 December 2002.

The shape and design of Romanian road signs largely follows that used in other European countries. Romania is a signatory to the 1968 Vienna Convention of Road Signs and Signals and the 1971 European Agreement supplementing it. Romania signed the Vienna Convention on Road Signs and Signals on 8 November 1968 and ratified it on 9 December 1980.

The signs themselves are defined through SR 1848-1 (with 1848-2 regulating their technical details and 1848-3 defining surface road markings). This standard was founded in 1950 (then known as STAS 1848/50), and has been revised numerous times, the last time being in 2024.

== Warning signs ==
Dangerous bend to the left

Dangerous bend to the right

Double bend first to the left

Double bend first to the right

Very dangerous bend (long panel)

Very dangerous bend (single panel, mounted in succession)

Steep descent

Steep ascent

Road narrows on both sides

Road narrows on right

Road narrows on left

Soft verges

Traffic queues likely

Tunnel ahead

Moveable bridge ahead

Unprotected riverbank ahead

Uneven road ahead

Speed bump ahead

Slippery road

Loose chippings

Falling rocks

Pedestrian crossing ahead

Children ahead

Cyclists ahead

Domesticated animals ahead

Wild animals ahead

Roadworks ahead

Traffic lights ahead

Airport

Crosswinds

Two-way traffic ahead

Other dangers ahead

Accident ahead

Crossroads without priority

Crossroads with priority

Crossroads with priority (right)

Crossroads with priority (left)

Crossroads with priority (offset)

Crossroads with priority (offset)

Roundabout ahead

Level crossing with a railway with barriers

Level crossing with a railway without barriers

Level crossing with tram tracks

Advance warning panels for railway crossings

Advance warning panels for motorway exits

Directional beacons to the left and right

Directional beacons on the both sides

Crossbuck without light signals (single track)

Crossbuck without light signals (multiple tracks)

Crossbuck with light signals (single track)

Crossbuck with light signals (multiple tracks)

Agricultural vehicles

Roundabout directions

Accident blackspot

== Priority signs ==
Give way (yield)

Stop and give way (yield)

Priority road

End of priority road

Give way (yield) to oncoming vehicles

Priority over oncoming vehicles

== Prohibitory or restriction signs ==
No entry

No unauthorized vehicles

No motor vehicles except motorcycles without sidecar

No motorcycles

No cyclists

No mopeds

No heavy vehicles

No vehicles pulling a trailer

No buses

No pedestrians

No animal-drawn vehicles

No handcarts

No agricultural vehicles

No motor vehicles

No motor vehicles and animal-drawn vehicles

Width limit

Height limit

Weight limit (overall)

Weight limit per single axle

Weight limit per double axle

Weight limit per triple axle

Length limit

Minimum safe distance

No left turn

No right turn

No U-turns

No overtaking

No overtaking by trucks

Maximum speed limit (50 km/h)

Maximum speed limit per vehicle category

Honking forbidden

Customs control

Tolled road

Police control

End of all restrictions

End of maximum speed limit (50 km/h)

End of overtaking restriction

No parking

No stopping

No parking by odd days

No parking by even days

No parking zone

End of no parking zone

Start of speed limit zone

End of speed limit zone

Restricted traffic zone

End of restricted traffic zone

No vehicles carrying explosives

No vehicles carrying hazardous goods

No vehicles carrying water pollutants

== Mandatory signs ==
Go straight ahead

Turn right

Turn right ahead

Go straight ahead or turn right

Keep to the right

Pass on either side

Roundabout

Buses only

Bicycle path

Pedestrian path

Separated pedestrian and bicycle path (option 1)

Separated pedestrian and bicycle path (option 2)

Shared pedestrian and bicycle path

Minimum speed limit

End of minimum speed limit

Mandatory snow chains

Mandatory winter tyres

Route for vehicles carrying hazardous goods (go straight ahead)

Route for vehicles carrying hazardous goods (right)

Route for vehicles carrying hazardous goods (left)

== Direction signs ==
Advance direction sign at an grade-level intersection

Advance direction sign at a grade-separated intersection

Advance direction sign

Advance direction sign for a route bypassing a major settlement

Advance direction sign at a roundabout

Road closed or open to public traffic

Restricted road and its detour

Advance direction sign for exit

Advance direction sign for rest area

Route confirmation and distance sign (non-motorways)

Route confirmation and distance sign (motorways)

Intersection with railway crossing

Alternative route (in order to turn left)

Bus lane

Dead end

Truck route (option 1)

Truck route (option 2)

Truck route (option 3)

Lane directions ahead (variant 1)

Lane directions ahead (variant 2)

Lane directions ahead (variant 3)

Crawler lane ahead

Lane merges ahead (from right)

Lane merges ahead (from left)

Minimum speed limit on the innermost lane

Minimum speed limits per lane

Maximum speed limits per lane

Road with a bus lane coming from the opposite way

Direction sign (towards a city, with motorway symbol)

Direction sign (towards a motorway)

Direction sign (for European route)

Direction sign (towards a city, with trunk road symbol)

Direction sign (variant with multiple destinations)

Direction sign (variant for trucks)

Direction sign (towards a tourist site)

Direction sign (towards the city center)

Direction sign (towards an airport)

Direction sign (towards a city, detour)

Direction sign (detour)

National route (trunk road)

County road

Communal road

European route

Trans-European Transport Network route

Motorway name

Town entrance (variant 1)

Town entrance (variant 2)

Town exit (variant 1)

Town exit (variant 2)

County name

River name

Route confirmation and distance sign

No trucks in this lane

Emergency telephone

== Information signs ==
Pedestrian crossing

Pedestrian crossing (variant with reflective outer edges)

Border crossing

One-way traffic ahead

One-way traffic

Motorway begins

Motorway ends

Expressway begins

Expressway ends

Speed limits on the motorway

Hospital

First aid or hospital

Police

Pedestrian overpass (footbridge)

Pedestrian underpass (subway)

Bus stop

Tram stop

Taxi stand

Tyre repair shop

Telephone

Gas station

Gas station with unleaded gasoline

Gas station with liquified petroleum gas

Hotel or motel

Restaurant

Refreshments

Camping site

Caravan site

Camping and caravan site

Picnic area

Cabin

Public toilet

Repair garage

Parking area

Parking on kerb

Parking garage

Service area

Residential zone

Residential zone ends

Recommended speed zone

End of recommended speed zone

Tunnel

End of tunnel

Rolling highway or motorail service

Ferry

Port

Train station

Bus station

Rent a car

Beach

Hunting area

Fishing area

Wineyard

Industrial area

Post office

Drinking water

Playground for children

Stadium

Supermarket

Internet access point

Theater

Museum

Weighting station

Speed camera

Radio station with traffic information

Recommended speed

Information point

Street name (varies by town)

Street direction (varies by town)

Property number

Pedestrian zone

End of pedestrian zone

Traffic monitoring

Emergency lay-by

Highway patrol

Keep your distance (for speeds under 50 km/h)

Keep your distance (for speeds over 50 km/h)

Ticket

Emergency telephone

Road vignette (pricing scheme)

== Tourist information signs ==
Castle

Historical settlement

Cemetery

Church

Cathedral

Nature reserve

Waterfall

Cave

Skiing school

Sitting ski lift

Ski lift

Accommodation (bed and breakfast)

== Additional panels ==
Distance until the sign enters in force (variant)

Direction and distance until the sign enters in force (variant

Time period when the sign is in force (variant)

Distance for dangerous place

Vehicle category subjected to the sign

Time period when the sign is in force

Trains ahead

Distance showing for how long the sign is in force

Sign is enforced from here (variant showing distance for how long the sign is in force)

Sign is enforced from here (variant)

Sign continues to be enforced

Sign stops being enforced

Disabled persons

Vehicle category subjected to the sign (variant)

Parking meter

Parking meter (variant showing time and tariff)

Stop sign ahead (only under a give way/yield sign)

Except for trams

Except for vehicles supplying goods

Priority road direction

Priority road direction

Synchronized traffic lights

Directional arrow (only under traffic lights)

Flashing lights (used only with railway crossing and drawbridge signs)

Parking enforced in this area

Headlights on (used only with the tunnel sign)

Ice

Shower

Rain

Vehicles carrying explosives

Vehicles carrying dangerous goods

Vehicles carrying water pollutants

Road closed to public traffic

Pedestrian crossing abolished

Except for residents

Except for authorized motor vehicles

Parking enforced in this area (text-only variant)

Parking method (variant; next to the kerb)

Parking method (variant; on the kerb)

Parking method (variant; on the sidewalk)

Parking method (variant; on the kerb kerb, but laterally)

Parking method (variant; on the sidewalk, but laterally)

Parking method (variant; in parallel)

Wheelchair ascending ramp

Wheelchair descending ramp

Motorway exit number

== Historic signs ==
=== 1907 road signs ===
In 1907, the Automobile Club of Romania (ACR) installed the first road signs in the country, at the initiative of their members the previous year, supplementing the kilometer posts and directional fingerposts that had been installed by Nestor Urechia and his National School of Bridges and Roads in 1898-1899 between Câmpina and Predeal on the present-day DN1. The signs installed by the ACR were identical to those installed by the Kaiserreich-Automobil Club in the German Empire. They had a black background and white writings and symbols.

Bad road

Ditch

Winding descent with sharp turns

Descent

Ascent

Descent with sharp turn

Ascent with sharp turn

Sharp right turn

Sharp left turn

Dangerous junction

Manned level crossing

Bridge

Village

Tunnel or underbrige

Unmanned level crossing

=== 1911 road signs ===
Uneven road

Series of bends

Railway crossing

Crossroad

=== 1929 road signs ===
Uneven road

Series of bends

Crossroad

Protected railway crossing

Unprotected railway crossing

Danger

=== 1935 road signs ===
Uneven road

Series of bends

Crossroad

Protected railway crossing

Unprotected railway crossing

Danger

Danger (alternative sign)

Yield

No vehicles

No entry

No motor vehicles with more than three wheels

No motorcycles

No motor vehicles

Weight limit for motor vehicles

Weight limit

Speed limit

Width limit

Height limit

Customs

No overtaking

No honking

No parking

No stopping

Mandatory direction

Parking

Caution

First aid

=== 1950 road signs ===
==== Warning signs ====
Railway crossing (Note: Since 1957 it only denoted railway crossing without gates.)

Uneven road

Crossroad

Other danger

Series of curves

Steep descent

==== Prohibitory signs ====
Do not enter

No vehicles

No motor vehicles

No motorcycles

No trucks

No animal-driven vehicles

No bicycles

No entry for both vehicle category (variant 1) (Note: No trucks and motorcycles.)

No entry for both vehicle category (variant 2) (Note: No trucks and animal-driven vehicles.)

No parking

No stopping

No overtaking

Height limit

Width limit

Weight limit

Speed limit

No beeping

Checkpoint

Customs

End of all restrictions

==== Mandatory signs ====
Go forward or to the right

Go forward or to the left

Straight through only

Right turn only

Left turn only

One-way traffic (right)

One-way traffic (straight)

One-way traffic (left)

Roundabout

==== Information signs ====
Parking

Pedestrian crossing

Children crossing (school)

Factory

First-aid station

U-turn permitted

Settlement sign (variant 1)

Settlement sign (variant 2)

Advance direction sign

Direction sign (variant 1)

Direction sign (variant 2)

==== 1957 addition ====
Slippery road

Roadworks

Road narrows

Railway crossing with gates

Animals

Stop

=== 1961 road signs ===
==== Warning signs ====
Level crossing without gates

Level crossing with gates

Countdown beacon

Countdown beacon

Countdown beacon

Countdown beacon

Crossroad

Crossroad with priority

Give way

Right curve

Left curve

Series of curves

Double right curve

Double left curve

Steep descent

Slippery surface

Uneven road

Road narrows

Animals

Pedestrian crossing

Children

Roadworks

Other danger

==== Prohibitory signs ====
No entry

No vehicles

No motor vehicles except motorcycles

No trucks

No motorcycles

No motor vehicles

No overtaking

No honking

No bicycles

No horse carts

Height limit

Width limit

Weight limit

Axle weight limit

Speed limit

No parking

No stopping

Stop

No right turn

No left turn

Customs

Checkpoint

End of all restrictions

==== Mandatory signs ====
Proceed straight

Turn right

Turn left

Proceed straight or right

Proceed straight or left

Roundabout

Bicycle path

==== Information signs ====
Parking

Hospital

First aid

Gas station

Repair service

Telephone

Priority road

End of priority road

U-turn permitted

== See also ==
- Comparison of European road signs
- Transport in Romania
- Road signs in Moldova
