= Road signs in Mongolia =

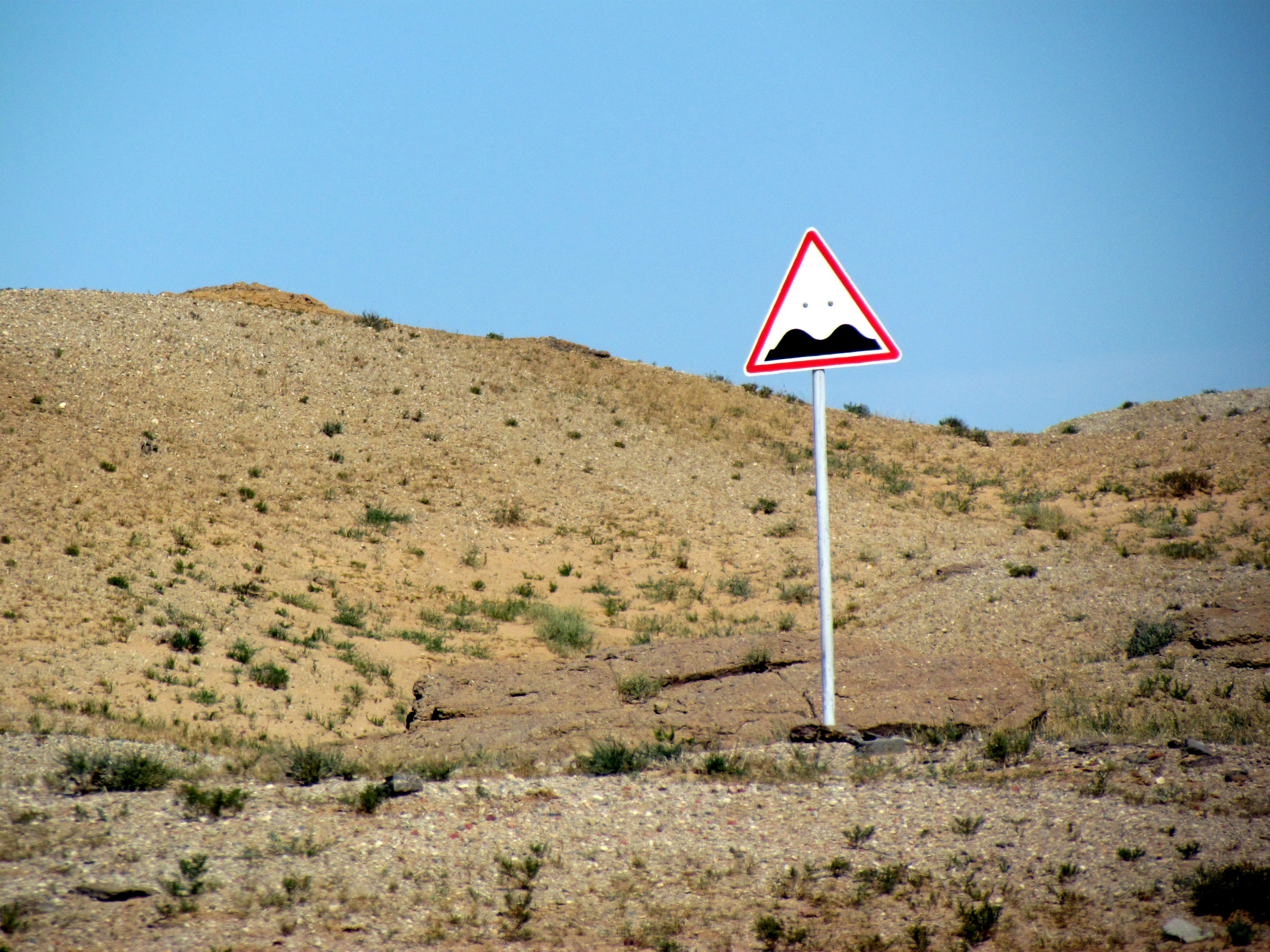
Road sign in Dornogovi

Road signs in Mongolia are regulated in the MNS 4597:2014 technical standard and conform to the general pattern of road signs as set out in the Vienna Convention on Road Signs and Signals, to which Mongolia acceded on December 19, 1997.

Although Mongolia was never part of the Soviet Union, roads signs prescribed in the technical standard bear much similarity with those used in post-Soviet counterparts today (based on the Soviet standard GOST 10807-78 and the Russian standard GOST R 52290-2004).

The Arial Bold font is used on Mongolian road signs.

== Road signs ==
=== Warning signs ===
Warning signs

Level crossing with barrier or gate

Level crossing without barrier or gate

Single track level crossing

Multi-track level crossing

Level crossing countdown

Level crossing countdown

Level crossing countdown

Level crossing countdown

Level crossing countdown

Level crossing countdown

Crossroads with priority to the right (decommissioned)

Roundabout (decommissioned)

Traffic light

Curve to the right

Curve to the left

Double curve, first to the right

Double curve, first to the left

Steep hill downwards

Steep hill upwards

Slippery road

Uneven road

Road bump

Loose chipings

Road narrows on both sides

Road narrows on right side

Road narrows on left side

Two-way traffic

Pedestrian crossing

Children or nearby educational establishment

Bicycle path merges

Roadworks area

Domestic cattle crossing

Deer crossing

Unstable rocks

Crosswinds

Low-flying aircraft

Tunnel

Other danger (e.g.: potholes)

Direction of rotation

Direction of rotation

Direction of rotation

Direction of rotation

Direction of rotation

=== Prohibitory signs ===
Prohibitory signs

No entry

Closed to all vehicles

No motor vehicles

No trucks over 8 tonnes

No motorcycles

No tractor or motor equipment

No trailers

No animal-drawn vehicles

No bicycles

No pedestrians

Weight limit

Weight limit per axle

Maximum height

Maximum width

Maximum length for a vehicle

Minimum safe following distance between vehicles

Customs

No right turn

No left turn

No U-turn

No overtaking

End of overtaking prohibition

No overtaking by heavy goods vehicles

End of overtaking prohibition by heavy goods vehicles

Maximum speed limit (50 km/h)

No speed limit during day (50km/h at night or during weather conditions)

No horn

No stopping

No parking

No speed limit

=== Priority signs ===
Priority signs

Priority or main road

End of priority or main road

Crossroads with priority

Side road with priority

Side road with priority

Give way

Stop

Give way to oncoming traffic

Priority over oncoming traffic

=== Mandatory signs ===
Mandatory signs

Go straight

Turn right

Turn left

Go straight or turn right

Go straight or turn left

Turn left or right

Keep right

Keep left

Pass either side

Roundabout (cul-de-sac was decommissioned in 2024 please stop adding it back)

Bicycle path

Pedestrians only

Minimum speed limit

End of minimum speed

=== Guide signs ===
Guide signs

Motorway [highway]

End of motorway [highway]

Start of province or county area

End of the province or county area

The beginning of the settlement

The end of the settlement

One-way street

End of one-way street

Turning to one-way street

Turning to one-way street

Driving directions in lanes turn

Driving directions in lanes

Driving directions in lanes

Driving directions in lanes

Driving directions in lanes

Driving directions in lanes

Driving directions in lanes

Lane direction

Lane direction

Lane direction

New lane begins

New lane begins

New lane begins

New lane begins

Lane ends

Lane ends

Bus lane

Traffic scheme

Place to U-turn

Parking lot

Road bump

Pedestrian crossing

Pedestrian crossing

Pedestrian subway

Pedestrian subway

Footbridge

Footbridge

Bus stop

Taxi stand

Residential area

End of residential area

School zone

End of school zone

General speed limits

Advisory speed limit

Emergency stop lane

Dead end

Dead end

Dead end

Direction of movement for trucks

Direction of movement for trucks

Direction of movement for trucks

Stop (decommissioned after signing the Vienna conv.)

Advance directions

Advance directions

Advance directions

Advance directions

Direction cursor

Direction cursor

Direction cursor

Object name

Distances signpost

Kilometer sign

Route number

Route number

Route number

Route number

Detour scheme (5months of temporary usage for road maintenance please do not re add it, decommissioned 2020,)

Detour for road maintenance

Detour for road maintenance

Detour for road maintenance

Drive on opposing roadway to accommodate road maintenance

end of road maintenance and go back to accommodating lane

=== Service signs ===
Service signs

First Aid Station

Hospital

Petrol station

Breakdown station

Car wash

Telephone

Emergency rations (only in rural areas)

Drinking and/or running water

Hotel or motel

Camping

City dwellers

Rest area [unsheltered]

Rest area [sheltered]

Toilets

Extinguisher

Traffic police

=== Supplementary signs ===
Supplementary signs

Distance to the object [in metric meters]

Stop at given distance [in metric meters]

Distance to the object

Distance to the object

Coverage area

Coverage area

Coverage area

Coverage area

Coverage area

Coverage area

Directions of action

Directions of action

Directions of action

Type of vehicle

Type of vehicle

Type of vehicle

Type of vehicle

Type of vehicle

Type of vehicle

Type of vehicle

Saturdays, Sundays and holidays

Working days

Days of the week (eg: mon-wed)

Validity period

Validity period

Validity period

Validity period

Method of parking the vehicle

Method of parking the vehicle

Method of parking the vehicle

Method of parking the vehicle

Method of parking the vehicle

Method of parking the vehicle

Method of parking the vehicle

Method of parking the vehicle

Method of parking the vehicle

Parking with an idle engine prohibited

Paid services

Limitation duration

The tow truck is working

Place for car inspection

Limitation of the permitted maximum mass

Direction of the main road

Traffic lane (decommissioned)

Disabled people

Blind or visually impaired pedestrians

Slippery road when rained

Slippery road when snowy or icy
