= Road signs in Moldova =

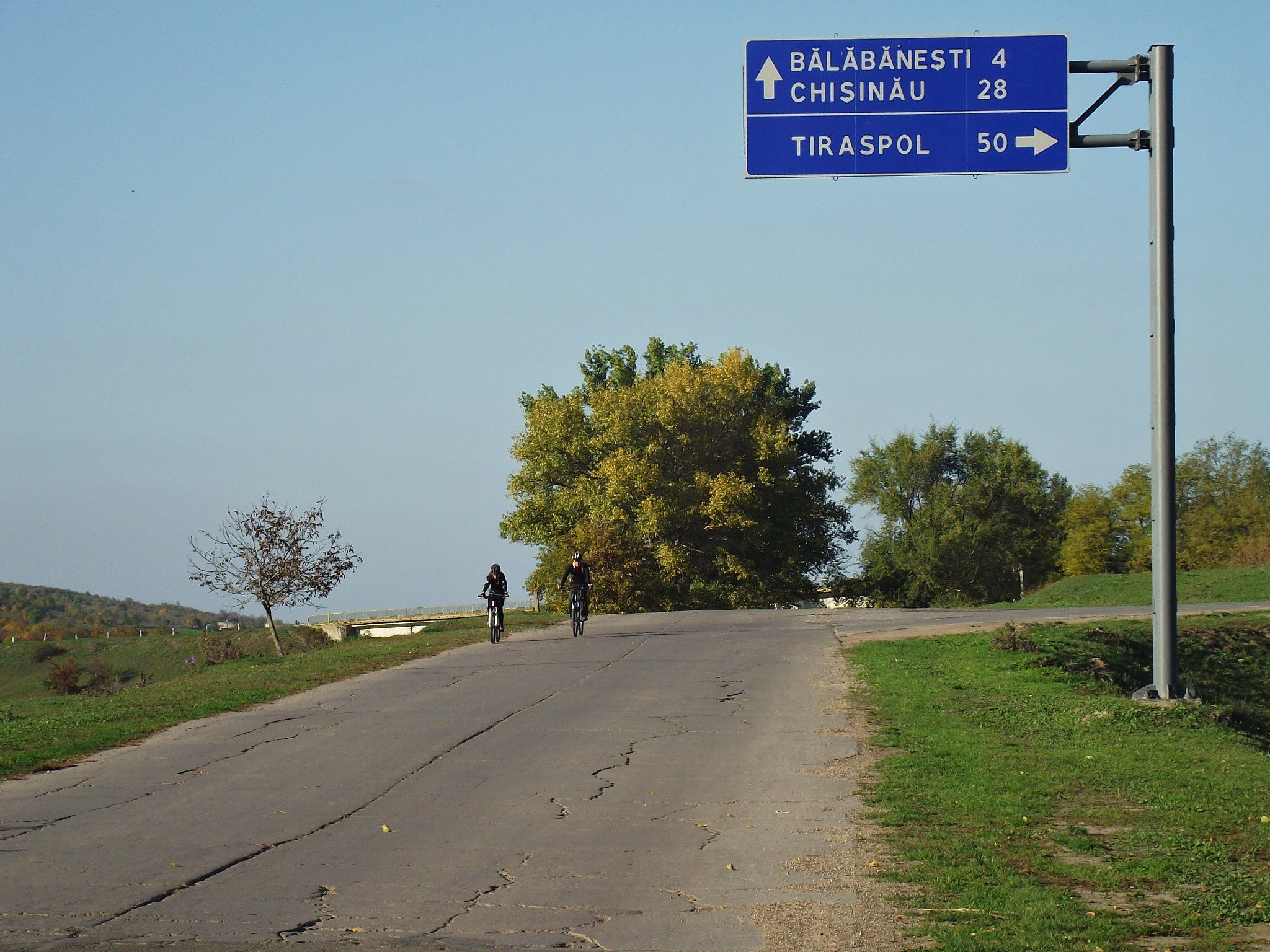
Road signs on the E581 road.

Road signs in Moldova are regulated primarily by Government Decision No. 357 of May 13, 2009, which approved the Road Traffic Regulations (Romanian: Regulamentul circulației rutiere). After gaining independence from the USSR in 1991, Moldova started adapting its own road signage system. Moldova acceded to the Vienna Convention on Road Signs and Signals on 8 October 2015.

== Warning signs ==
Level crossing with barriers

Level crossing without barriers

Single-track level crossing

Multi-track level crossing

Level crossing countdown

Level crossing countdown

Level crossing countdown

Level crossing countdown

Level crossing countdown

Level crossing countdown

Tram crossing ahead

Crossroads without priority

Crossroads with priority

Crossroads with priority from the right

Crossroads with priority from the left

Roundabout ahead

Traffic lights

Mobile bridge

Unprotected riverbank

Dangerous curve to the right

Dangerous curve to the left

Double curve first to the left

Double curve first to the right

Dangerous descent

Dangerous ascent

Slippery road

Uneven road

Speed bump

Gravel surface

Dangerous roadside

Road narrows on both sides

Road narrows on the right

Road narrows on the left

Two-way traffic

Pedestrian crossing

Children

Cyclists

Roadworks

Domesticated animals

Wild animals

Falling rocks on the left

Falling rocks on the right

Sidewinds

Airport

Tunnel

Traffic queues

Other dangers

Accident

Black point

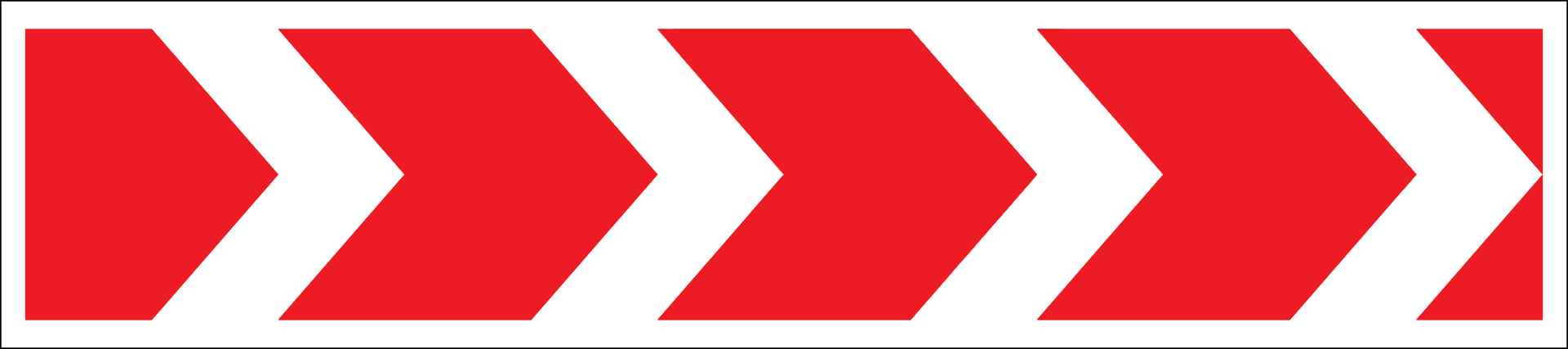
Dangerous curve direction to the right

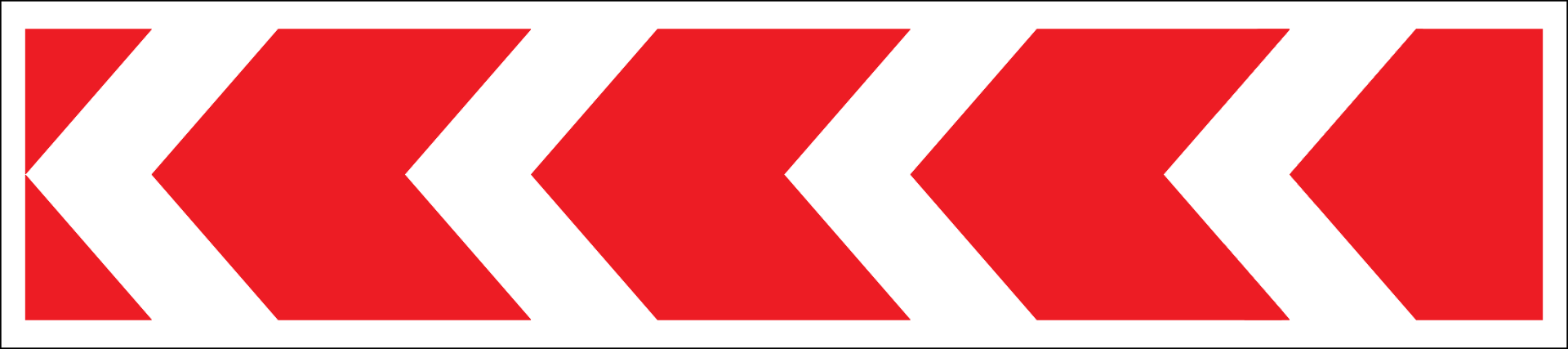
Dangerous curve direction to the left

Dangerous curve direction to the both sides

Dangerous curve chevron to the right (successive panels version)

Dangerous curve chevron to the left (successive panels version)

== Priority signs ==
Give way

Stop sign

Priority road

End of priority road

Priority for oncoming traffic

Priority over oncoming traffic

Priority direction

Priority direction

== Prohibitory signs ==
No entry

No vehicles

No motor vehicles, except motorcycles

No trucks

No motorcycles

No mopeds

No tractors

No trailers

No vehicles carrying explosives

No vehicles carrying dangerous goods

No animal-drawn vehicles

No bicycles

No handcarts

No pedestrians

Maximum weight

Maximum weight per axle

Maximum height

Maximum width

Maximum length

Customs

Police

No right turn

No left turn

No U-turn

Minimum safe distance

No overtaking

End of overtaking prohibition

No overtaking by trucks

End of overtaking prohibition by trucks

Maximum speed limit (60 km/h)

End of maximum speed limit (60 km/h)

Speed limit per vehicle category

No horns

No stopping

No parking

No parking on odd-numbered dates

No parking on even-numbered dates

End of all prohibitions

No vehicles equipped with gas supply system

== Mandatory signs ==
Go straight

Turn right

Turn left

Go straight or turn right

Go straight or turn left

Turn right or left

Keep right

Keep left

Pass either side

Roundabout

Bicycle path

End of bicycle path

Shared pedestrian and bicycle path

End of shared pedestrian and bicycle path

Segregated pedestrian and bicycle path

End of segregated pedestrian and bicycle path

Segregated pedestrian and bicycle path

End of segregated pedestrian and bicycle path

Pedestrian path

End of pedestrian path

Minimum speed limit (50 km/h)

End of minimum speed limit (50 km/h)

Snow chains compulsory

End of snow chains compulsory

Go straight for vehicles carrying dangerous goods

Turn right for vehicles carrying dangerous goods

Turn left for vehicles carrying dangerous goods

== Information signs ==
National speed limits

Motorway

End of motorway

Expressway

End of expressway

Bus stop

Route vehicle waiting pavilion

Tram stop

Taxi stop

Do not block intersection

Radar

Traffic monitoring

Vignette

Vignette control

Video control of the vignette

One-way traffic

End of one-way traffic

Entrance to one-way traffic

Entrance to one-way traffic

Lane directions

Lane directions

Lane directions

Lane directions

Direction of travel on the lane

Direction of travel on the lane

Direction of travel on the lane

Direction of travel on the lane

Additional tape

Additional tape

Additional tape

End of the tape

End of the tape

Lane directions

Lane directions

Lane directions

Reversed lane

End of reversed lane

Road with reversed lane

End of road with reversed lane

Entrance to the road with a reversed lane

Entrance to the road with a reversed lane

U-turn area

U-turn zone

Parking

Reversed parking

Parking garage

Speed bump

Pedestrian crossing

Pedestrian crossing

Subway

Subway

Footbridge

Footbridge

Advisory speed limit (50 km/h)

Dead end

Dead end on the right

Dead end on the left

Living street

End of living street

Parking zone

End of parking zone

Speed limit zone

End of speed limit zone

Pedestrian zone

End of pedestrian zone

Personalizing directions

Personalizing directions

Pre-signaling of travel directions

Pre-signaling of travel directions

Pre-signaling of travel directions

Bypass

Pre-signaling of the locality bypass route

Traffic scheme

Signpost

Signpost

Signpost

Directions to certain locations or destinations

Directions to certain locations or destinations

Distances to the indicated locations

Built-up area

End of built-up area

Built-up area

End of built-up area

River name

Street name

Direction to the street

Kilometer indicator for motorways

Kilometer indicator for expressways

Itinerary number

European route number

Itinerary number

Itinerary numuber

Itinerary number

Itinerary number

Itinerary number

Direction for trucks

Direction for trucks

Directions for trucks

Stop-line

Prohibition or restriction on a side road

Reversible traffic

End of reversible traffic

Entrance to the road with reversible traffic

Milestone

Milestone

Milestone

== Service signs ==
Car rentals

Bus station

Train station

Port

First aid

Hospital

Petrol station

Car service

Technical testing station

Vulcanization

Emergency lay-by

Vehicle scale

Car wash

Telephone

Restaurant

Shopping center

Drinkable water

Hotel or motel

Camping

Picnic area

Post office

Police

Toilet

Beach or pool

Information

== Additional panels ==
Distance

Distance to stop

Direction and distance

Direction and distance

Action area

End of action area

Action area

Action area

Action area

Action area

Action area

Direction of action

Direction of action

Direction of action

Vehicle category

Vehicle category

Vehicle category

Vehicle category

Vehicle category

Vehicle category

Vehicle category

Vehicle category

Vehicle category

Saturdays, Sundays and holidays

Working days

Days of the week

Action time

Action time

Action time

Action time

Indicator start-up temperature

How to park

How to park

How to park

How to park

How to park

How to park

How to park

How to park

How to park

Parking with the engine off

Priority road direction

Priority road direction

Obstacle signaling

Obstacle signaling

Obstacle signaling

Speed bump

Paid services

Paid parking

Restriction on the duration stay

Place for checking vehicles

Maximum mass restriction

Dangerous approach

Traffic lane

Blind pedestrians

Wet road

Slippery road

Tipping hazard

Disabiled persons

Except for disabiled persons

Headlamps obbligation

Tow-away zone

Direction of movement

Direction of movement

Direction of movement

Direction of movement

Direction of movement

Direction of traffic

Resonator strips

== See also ==
- Road signs in Romania
