= Road signs in Slovenia =

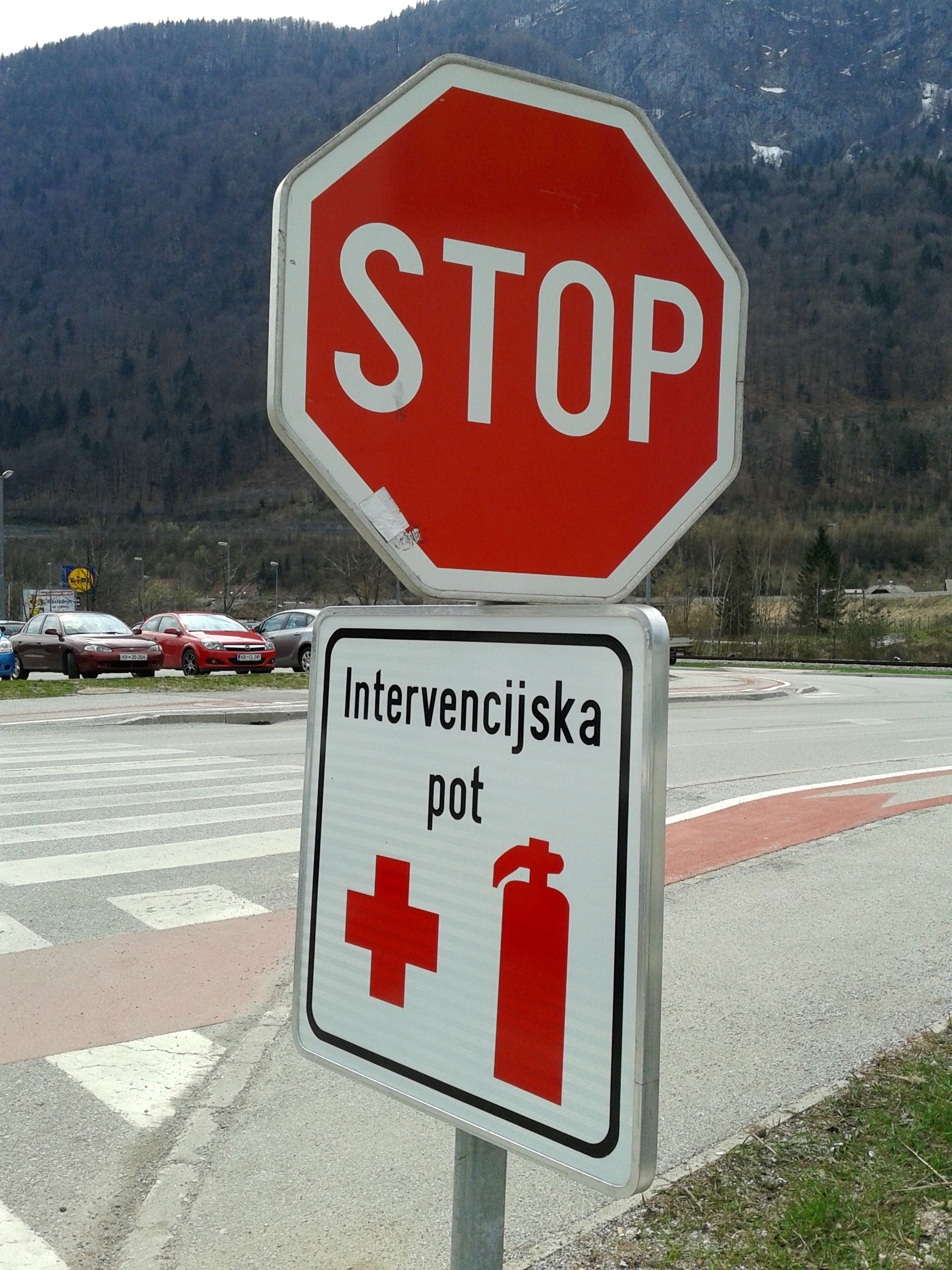
Stop sign located in Jesenice, Slovenia

Road signs in Slovenia are regulated by the Rules on Traffic Signs and Road Equipment on Roads (Slovene: Pravilnik o prometni signalizaciji in prometni opremi na cestah). Slovenia declared independence from Yugoslavia on June 25, 1991, and later joined the Vienna Convention on Road Signs and Signals on April 14, 2011.

Slovenia, along with other former Yugoslav countries, uses the SNV typeface on road signs, but also sometimes integrates the Arial and Helvetica typefaces.

In some more remote areas of Slovenia, old signs with a yellow background from the Yugoslav era can be found, although they are slowly being replaced. Otherwise, road signs with a yellow background indicate roadworks or temporary conditions.

== Warning signs ==
I-1
Curve to the left

I-1.1
Curve to the right

I-2
Double curve, to the left

I-2.1
Double curve, to the right

I-3
Steep descent

I-4
Steep ascent

I-5
Road narrows

I-5.1
Road narrows, to the right

I-5.2
Road narrows, to the left

I-6
Drawbridge

I-7
Unprotected quayside or riverbank

I-8
Uneven road

I-9
Dip

I-10
Speedbump

I-11
Slippery road

I-12
Loose road surface

I-13
Falling rocks

I-13.1
Falling rocks

I-14
Pedestrian crossing ahead

I-15
Children

I-16
Cyclists ahead

I-17
Cattle on the road

I-18
Deer on the road

I-19
Roadworks

I-20
Traffic signals

I-21
Low-flying aircraft

I-22
Crosswind from the left

I-22.1
Crosswind from the right

I-23
Two-way traffic

I-24
Tunnel ahead

I-25
Other dangers ahead

I-26
Crossroads

I-27
Crossing with minor roads

I-28
Crossing with minor road on the left.

I-28.1
Crossing with minor road on the right.

I-29
Merging road from the left.

I-29.1
Merging road from the right.

I-30
Roundabout ahead.

I-31
Tramway

I-32
Ice on the road.

I-33
Traffic queues ahead.

I-34
Dangerous shoulder.

I-35
Extreme risk of wildfires.

I-36
Level crossing with barriers ahead.

I-37
Level crossing without barriers ahead.

I-38
Railway crossing with a single track.

I-38.1
Railway crossing with multiple tracks.

I-41
Traffic accident.

== Regulatory signs ==
II-1
Give way

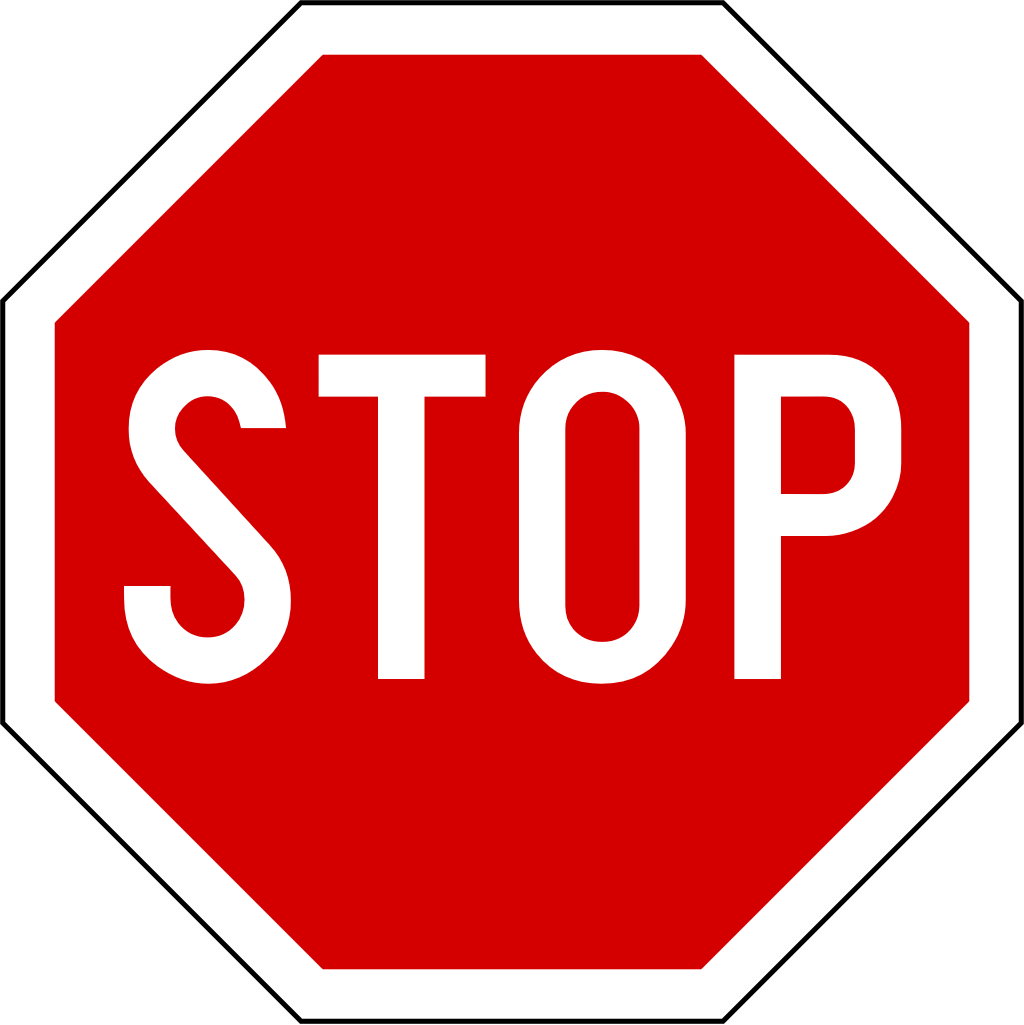
II-2
Stop sign

II-33
Give way to oncoming traffic.

II-4
No entry.

II-3
Road closed to all vehicles, except pedestrians.

II-18
Road closed for all motor vehicles.

II-5
Road closed to all motor vehicles, except mopeds and motorcycles.

II-12
Road closed to motorcycles.

II-13
Road closed to mopeds.

II-14
Road closed to cycles.

II-7
Road closed to trucks.

II-10
Road closed to vehicles towing a trailer, except for semi-trailer and light-residential trailer.

II-6
Road closed to buses.

II-8
Road closed to trucks carrying dangerous water pollutants.

II-9
Road closed to vehicles carrying explosives or inflammable substances.

II-9.1
Road closed to vehicles carrying dangerous goods.

II-10.2
Road closed to vehicles towing a trailer.

II-11
Road closed to farm vehicle.

II-15
Road closed to animal-drawn vehicles.

II-16
Road closed to trolleys or carts.

II-17
Road closed to pedestrians.

II-19
Road closed to motor vehicles and animal-drawn vehicles.

II-20
Road closed to all vehicles exceeding the maximum width.

II-21
Road closed to all vehicles exceeding the maximum height.

II-22
Road closed to all vehicles exceeding the maximum weight.

II-23
Road closed to all vehicles exceeding the maximum permissible width per axle.

II-24
Road closed to all vehicles exceeding the maximum permissible length.

II-25
Minimum driving distance between vehicles.

II-26
Left turn prohibited.

II-26.1
Right turn prohibited.

II-27
U-turn prohibited.

II-28
No overtaking.

II-29
No overtaking by trucks.

II-30 (40)
Maximum speed limit - 40 km/h.

II-31
No honking.

II-32
Customs (passing without stopping first prohibited).

II-32.1
Police (passing without stopping first prohibited).

II-32.2
Toll (passing without stopping first prohibited).

II-34
No stopping or standing.

II-35
No parking.

II-36
No parking on odd numbered days.

II-37
No parking on even numbered days.

II-38 (40)
Minimum speed limit - 40 km/h.

II-39
Snow chains mandatory.

II-40
Cycles path.

II-41
Pedestrian path.

II-42
Segregated path for pedestrians and bicycles.

II-42.1
Segregated path for pedestrians and bicycles.

II-43
Shared path for pedestrians and bicycles.

II-44
Equestrian path.

II-45
Proceed straight.

II-45.1
Turn left.

II-45.2
Turn right.

II-45.3
Turn left ahead.

II-45.4
Turn right ahead.

II-46
Proceed straight or turn left.

II-46.1
Proceed straight or turn right.

II-46.2
Turn left or right.

II-47
Keep right.

II-47
Keep left.

II-48
Roundabout mandatory.

== Information signs ==
III-1
Priority over oncoming traffic.

III-2
One-way traffic.

III-2.1
One-way street to the left.

III-2.2
One-way street to the right.

III-3
Priority road.

III-4
End of priority road.

III-5
Cyclist crossing.

III-6
Pedestrian crossing.

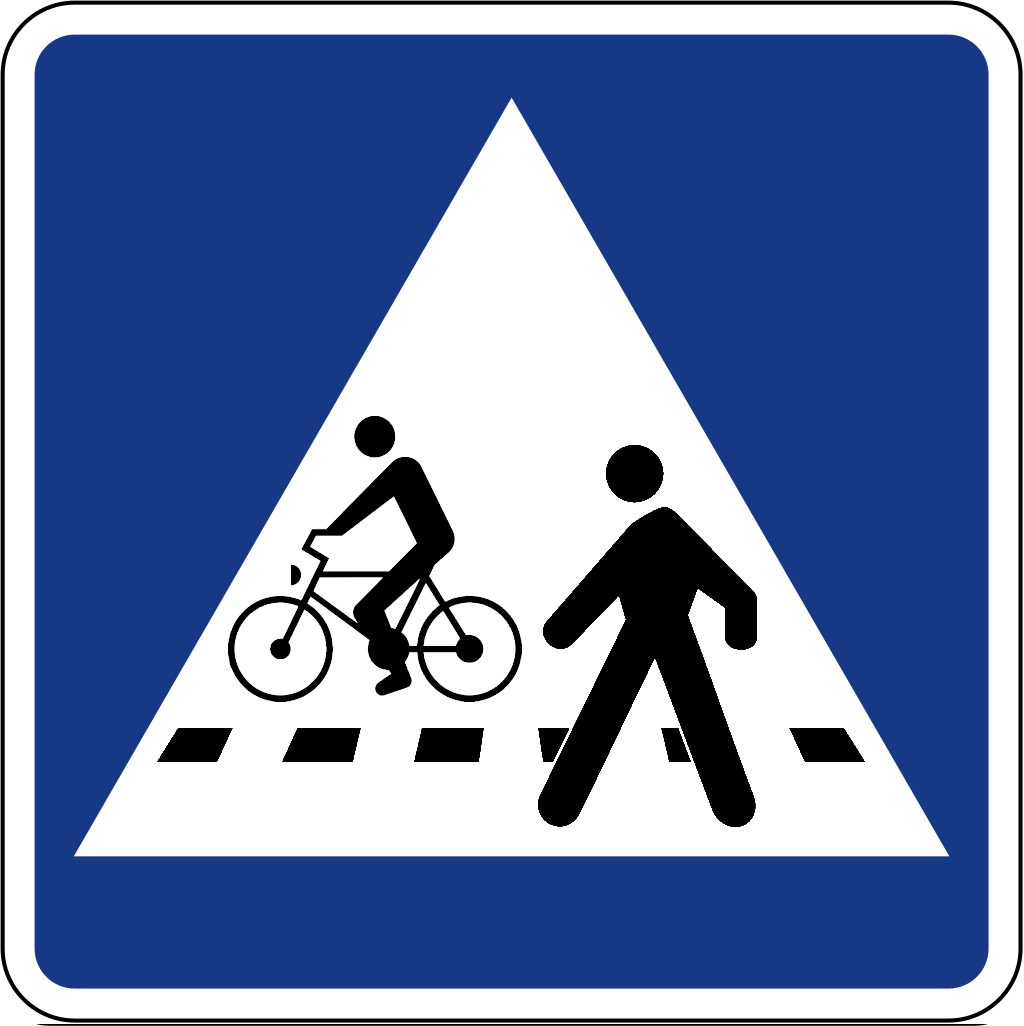
III-6.1
Pedestrian and cyclist crossing.

III-7
Underground or elevated pedestrian crossing.

III-8
Dead end road.

III-9
Left turn prohibited ahead, follow alternative route.

III-10
Start of motorway.

III-11
End of motorway.

III-12
Start of expressway (old sign)

III-13
End of expressway (old sign)

III-14
Settlement.

III-15
End of settlement.

III-16
End of no overtaking.

III-17
End of no overtaking by trucks.

III-18 (40)
End of maximum speed limit - 40 km/h.

III-19 (40)
End of minimum speed limit. - 40 km/h.

III-20
End of no honking.

III-21
End of all prohibitions.

III-22
End snow chains requirement.

III-23
End of bike path.

III-24
End of pedestrian path.

III-25
End of segregated path for pedestrians and bicycles.

III-25.1
End of segregated path for pedestrians and bicycles.

III-25.2
End of shared path for pedestrians and bicycles.

III-26
End of equestrian path.

III-27
No parking zone.

III-28
End of no parking zone.

III-29
Maximum speed limit zone (40 km/h).

III-30
End of maximum speed limit zone (40 km/h).

III-31
Pedestrian zone.

III-32
End of pedestrian zone.

III-33
Residential zone.

III-34
End of residential zone.

III-35
Parking.

III-36
Parking garage.

III-37
Metered parking.

III-38
Hospital.

III-39
First aid post

III-40
Vehicle repair shop.

III-41
Telephone.

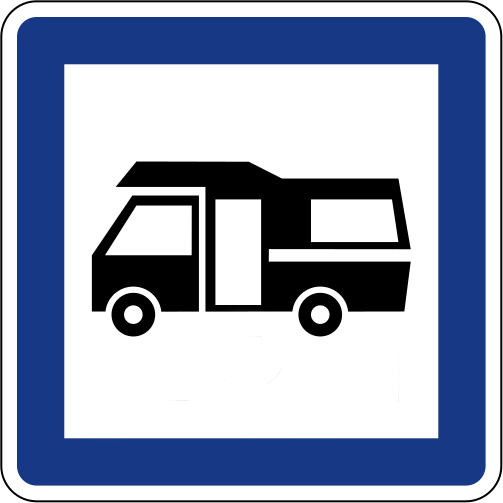
III-42a
Caravan site.

III-42b
Caravan waste station.

III-43
Petrol station.

III-44
Hotel or motel.

III-45
Restaurant.

III-46
Bar.

III-47
Picnic area.

III-48
Camping.

III-49
Caravan site.

III-50
Camping and caravan site.

III-51
Youth hostel.

III-52.1
Toilet.

III-52
Toilet with a sink.

III-53
Fire extinguisher.

III-54
Bus stop.

III-55
Tram stop.

III-56
Harbour / Port.

III-57
Marina.

III-58
Park & Ride facilities.

III-58.1
Park & Ride facilities.

III-60
Information.

III-60
Car wash.

III-61
Taxi stand

III-62
Drinking water

III-63
Road closure and tyre requirement information board.

III-64
Hairpin bend number.

III-65
Tunnel entrance sign.

III-66
Viaduct sign.

III-67
Mountain pass.

III-68
River name.

III-69
Police station.

III-70 (100)
Advisory speed (100 km/h)

III-71 (100)
End of advisory speed (100 km/h)

III-72
Bus lane

III-73
End of bus lane

III-74
Radio station information

III-75
National speed limits

III-76
Start of minimum speed lane

III-76.1
End of minimum speed lane

III-77
Water protection zone.

III-78
Bike route

III-79
European route number

III-80
Motorway number

III-81
Expressway number

III-82
Primary road number

III-83
Bike route number

III-85
Lane movement

III-92
Motorway interchange

== Additional signs ==
IV-1
Above sign effective after the distance shown.

IV-1.1
Stop sign ahead after the distance shown.

IV-10
Disabled parking.

IV-11
Tow-away zone.

IV-12
Above sign valid during rainy weather.

IV-12.1
Above sign valid during snowy weather.

IV-18
Children on the road.

== Retired signs ==
I-38
Railway crossing with a single track.

I-38.1
Railway crossing with multiple tracks.

== Other signs ==
Shared traffic space area with 20km/h speed limit

End of shared traffic space area with 20km/h speed limit

EU border sign of Slovenia

Type of paying toll

== See also ==
- Road signs in Croatia
- Road signs in Serbia
