= Road signs in Bosnia and Herzegovina =

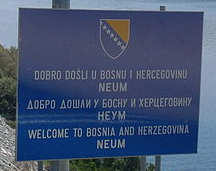
Entry road sign to Bosnia & Herzegovina near Neum.

Road signs in Bosnia and Herzegovina do not differ much from the rest of Europe, such as Croatia, Slovenia, Serbia and North Macedonia. The Ministry of Transportation of Bosnia and Herzegovina regulates them. Bosnian and Herzegovinan road signs have two scripts, Latin and Cyrillic script.

The former Yugoslavia had originally signed the Vienna Convention on Road Signs and Signals on November 8, 1968 and ratified it on June 6, 1977. Yugoslavia formerly used a yellow background on warning signs. After the breakup of Yugoslavia when Bosnia and Herzegovina declared its independence in 1992, the country succeeded to the Vienna Convention on January 12, 1994.

Bosnian and Herzegovinan road signs use the SNV typeface.

== Warning signs ==
Curve to left

Curve to right

Double curve, first to left

Double curve, first to right

Steep descent

Steep ascent

Road narrows

Road narrows on right side

Road narrows on left side

Opening or swing bridge

Quayside or riverbank ahead

Bump

Dip

Uneven road

Slippery road

Loose gravel

Fallen rocks (left)

Fallen rocks (right)

Pedestrian crossing ahead

Children

Pedestrians

Cyclists

Cattle

Deer

Roadworks

Traffic lights ahead

Traffic lights (horizontal) ahead

Low-flying aircraft

Crosswind from the right

Crosswind from the left

Two-way traffic

Tunnel

Other dangers

Intersection of crossroads of the same importance

Intersection with a side road at right angles

Joining a side road at right angles to the left

Joining a side road at right angles to the right

Joining the side road at a sharp angle to the left

Joining the side road at a sharp angle to the right

Roundabout ahead

Ice or snow

Rolling over or slipping of the vehicle

Accident ahead

Traffic queues

Soft verges

Warning of fire

Tramway

Level crossing with barriers ahead

Level crossing without barriers ahead

Single track level crossing

Multiple track level crossing

Distance panel for level crossing with barriers

Distance panel for level crossing without barriers

== Regulatory signs ==
Give way

Stop

All vehicles prohibition in both directions

No entry

No motor vehicles, except motorcycles

No buses

No trucks

No vehicles carrying dangerous water pollutants

No vehicles carrying explosives

No vehicles carrying dangerous goods

No trailers

No trailers

No tractors

No motorcycles

No mopeds

No bicycles

No mopeds and bicycles

No animal-drawn vehicles

No handcarts

No pedestrians

No motor vehicles

Vehicle width limit

Vehicle height limit

Vehicle weight limit

Maximum weight per axle

Maximum weight per tandem axle

Maximum length

Minimum safe distance

No left turn

No right turn

No U-turn

No overtaking

No overtaking by trucks

Maximum speed limit

No use horns

Customs

Police

Toll

Priority for oncoming traffic

No photography

No stopping

No parking

No parking at uneven days

No parking at even days

Minimum speed limit

Snow chains mandatory

Bicycle path

Pedestrian path

Shared pedestrian and bicycle path

Segretated pedestrian and bicycle path

Trail for riders

Proceed straight

Turn right

Turn left

Turn left ahead

Turn right ahead

U-turn

Prooced straight or turn left

Prooced straight or turn right

Turn left or right

Keep left

Keep right

Pass either side

Roundabout

== Guide signs ==
One-way street

One-way street (left)

One-way street (right)

Pedestrian crossing

Bicycle crossing

Children

Underground/overground passage

Speed bump

Dip

Living street

== Indication signs ==
Water protection area (FBiH)

Water protection area (RS)

School patrol (FBiH)

School patrol (RS)

The road of movement of the vehicle to the intersection where it is forbidden to turn left

Dead end (FBiH)

Dead end (RS)

Restrictions in available lanes

Use of lanes

Hospital (FBiH)

Hospital (RS,1)

Hospital (RS,2)

Police (FBiH)

Police (RS,1)

Police (RS,2)

First aid station

Use of lanes at an intersection (FBiH)

Use of lanes at an intersection (RS)

Use of lanes at an intersection for bicycles

Lane for buses and taxis (FBiH)

Lane for buses and taxis (RS)

End of lane for buses and taxis (FBiH)

End of lane for buses and taxis (RS)

Increased lane (FBiH)

Increased lane (RS)

Lane reduction (FBiH)

Lane reduction (RS)

Speed control

Traffic control

Overtaking prohibition ends (FBiH)

Overtaking prohibition ends (RS)

Overtaking prohibition for trucks ends (FBiH)

Overtaking prohibition for trucks ends (RS)

Ban on honking ends (FBiH)

Ban on honking ends (RS)

End of previous prohibitions

Minimum speed limit ends

Maximum speed limit ends (FBiH)

Maximum speed limit ends (RS)

End of mandatory winter tyres or chains for tyres

End of headlight obligation

Horse track ends

End of bike only

End of pedestrians only

Pedestrian and bicycle path ends

Pedestrian and bicycle path ends

End of living street

Speed limit zone

End of speed limit zone

No park zone

End of no park zone

Pedestrian zone

End of pedestrian zone

Recommended speed limit (FBiH)

Recommended speed limit (RS)

End of recommended speed limit (FBiH)

End of recommended speed limit (RS)

Parking zone

If put with road sign "parking zone" it means parking for wheelchair

Parking garage

Parking time limit (FBiH)

Parking time limit (RS)

Park and ride

Park and ride

Bridge

Wildlife crossing

Signpost

Built-up area (without Cyrlic script)

Built-up area (with Cyrlic script)

End of built-up area (without Cyrlic script)

End of built-up area (with Cyrlic script)

Altitude of the pass

Tunnel

Electric vehicle charging station (FBiH)

Electric vehicle charging station (RS)

Road information radio

Bus stop

Tram stop

Taxi stand

Airport

Port

Petrol station

Hotel

Public toilet

Fire extinguisher

Telephone

Information center

Cafe shop

Restaurant shop

Land for caravans

Land for RVs

Self water discharge

Camping area

Car wash

Tire dealer

Road assistance

Tool service Area

Drinking water

Vila

Park

Street sign

Manual traffic control (FBiH)

Manual traffic control (RS)

Chevrons

Chevrons

Chevrons

Chevrons

Pass either left or right

== Highway and expressway signs ==
Motorway

Motorway ends

Motorway signpost

Motorway signpost

Notice of exit along the freeway

Exit sign (FBiH)

Exit sign (RS)

Notice of exit for freeway junction

Third lane

End of third lane

Rest stop

Motorway information

River

Notice of toll payment along the motorway

Notice of toll payment along the motorway

Using card

Paying toll

Electronic paying toll

Paying toll with smart card

International road number

Emergency exit

Emergency exit

Highway number

Mileage on the highway

Motorized vehicles only

End of motorized vehicles only

Emergency stop

Emergency stop

Wrong way

Expressway road number

Progressive mileage on the expressway

Built-up area on a highway

End of built-up area on a highway

== Direction signs ==
Highway signpost

Signpost for secondary road

Highway exit destination

Pre-signaling of directions on the motorway

Pre-signaling of directions on the Expressway

Pre-signaling of directions on the extra-urban road

Pre-signaling of directions on the extra-urban road

Pre-signaling of directions on the extra-urban road

Pre-signposting of directions on an extra-urban road at an intersection with a circle road

Confirmation signal for extra-urban roads

== Border crossing signs ==
Border crossing

National car sign

National speed limits

== Additional panels ==
Segnale bosniaco	Significato	Spiegazione
	Distanza	Indica la distanza alla prescrizione indicata.
	Distanza allo STOP	Indica la distanza al segnale di fermarsi e dare precedenza.
	Estesa	Indica per quanti metri o chilometri il segnale a cui si riferisce è valido.
	Durata	Indica le ore nelle quali il segnale a cui si riferisce è valido.
	Consentito ai residenti	Indica che i residenti possono fare ciò che altrimenti è vietato agli altri utenti della strada.
	Categorie di veicoli	Indica che l'indicazione è riferita alla categoria di veicolo indicata.
	Rimozione coatta	Indica che è prevista la rimozione coatta dei veicoli in sosta.
	Estesa laterale	Indica per quanti metri a destra o a sinistra il segnale a cui si riferisce è valido.
	Inizio, continua e fine	Indicano l'inizio, la continuazione o la fine di una prescrizione.
	Disposizione delle auto in sosta	Indicano la disposizione delle auto in sosta.
	Disabili	Indica che l'indicazione è riferita ai disabili muniti di apposito contrassegno.
	Pioggia	Indica che il pericolo a cui si riferisce il segnale è relativo alle condizioni di meteo con pioggia.
	Ghiaccio o neve	Indica che il pericolo a cui si riferisce il segnale è relativo alle condizioni di meteo con ghiaccio o neve.
	Andamento della strada principale	Indicano l'andamento della strada principale.
	Mezzi spazzaneve in azione	Indica che sono in azione i mezzi spazzaneve.
	Segnaletica in rifacimento	Indica che la segnaletica orizzontale è in corso di rifacimento.
	Strada dissestata per x chilometri	Indica che la strada che si sta percorrendo è dissestata per il numero di chilometri indicato.
	Doppio senso per ciclisti	Indica che la pista ciclabile che si sta percorrendo è a doppio senso.
	Anziani	Indica che l'indicazione è riferita agli anziani.
	Ipovedenti	Indica che l'indicazione è riferita agli ipovedenti.
	Ipoudenti	Indica che l'indicazione è riferita agli ipoudenti.

== See also ==
- Road signs in Croatia
- Road signs in Montenegro
- Road signs in Serbia
