= Road signs in North Macedonia =

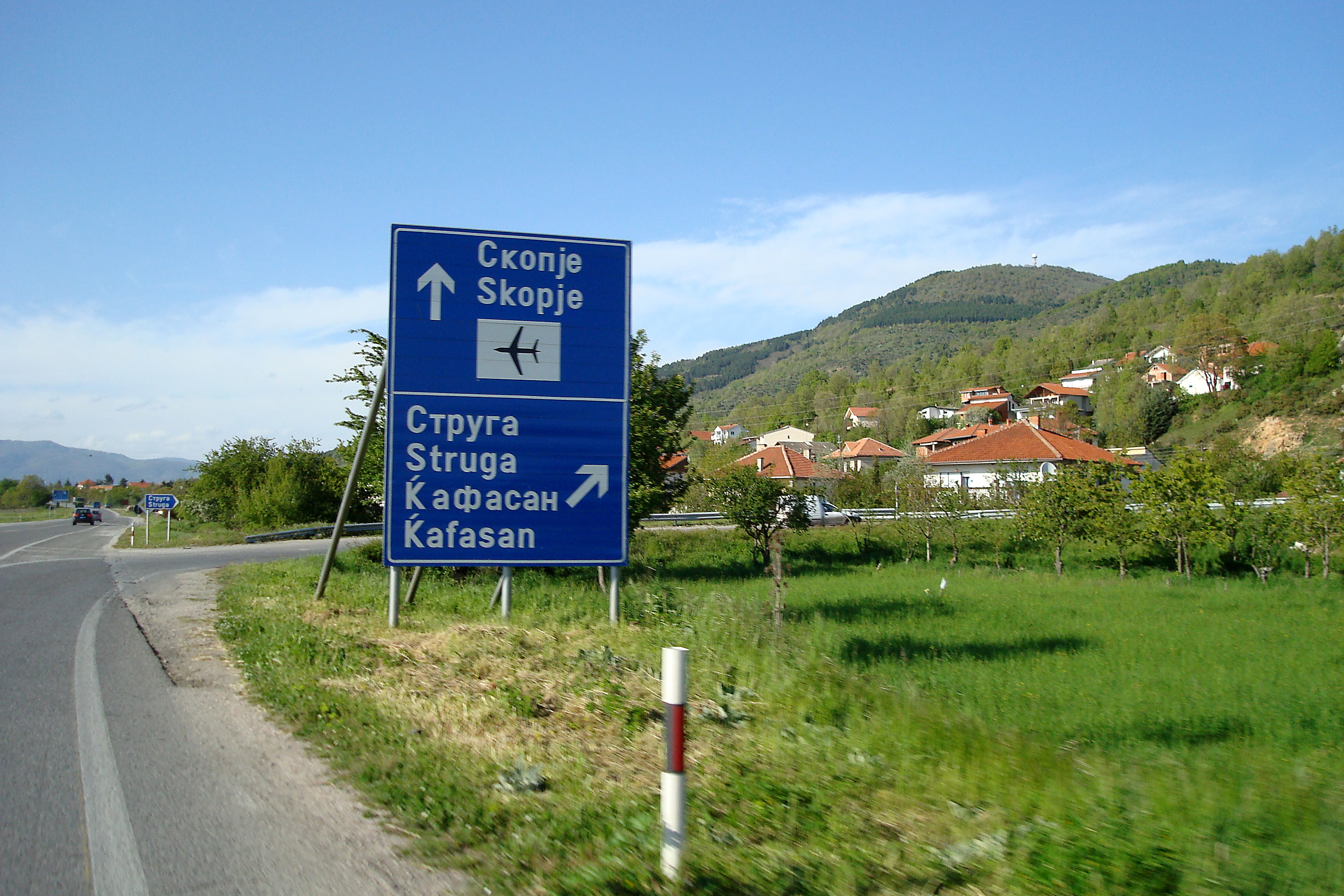
Direction sign in Podmolje

Road signs in North Macedonia are regulated in the Regulations on traffic signs, equipment and road signaling (Macedonian: Правилник за сообраќајните знаци, опрема и сигнализација на патот).

Road signs in North Macedonia follow the 1968 Vienna Convention on Road Signs and Signals, and the former Yugoslav standard road signs, used by the successor states of SFR Yugoslavia. North Macedonia adopted its own road sign standard after the former Yugoslav Republic of Macedonia gained its independence from Yugoslavia in the early 1990s. Inscriptions on road signs can be both in Cyrillic and Latin, as well as in Albanian. The SNV typeface and Arial Bold typeface are used on Macedonian road signs.

The former Yugoslavia had originally signed the Vienna Convention on Road Signs and Signals on November 8, 1968, and ratified it on June 6, 1977. Yugoslavia formerly used a yellow background on warning signs. After the breakup of Yugoslavia when the Republic of Macedonia declared its independence in 1991, the country succeeded to the Vienna Convention on December 20, 1999 (initially under the name Former Yugoslav Republic of Macedonia, but since 2019 under the name North Macedonia after the long-term dispute over the name of the Republic of Macedonia between Greece and the former Yugoslav Republic was resolved by renaming the latter one to North Macedonia).

== Warning signs ==
Other dangers

Crossroads without priority

Crossroads with priority

Crossroads with priority (right)

Crossroads with priority (left)

Merging traffic (right)

Merging traffic (left)

Roundabout ahead

Dangerous curve to the left

Dangerous curve to the right

Double curve, first to the left

Double curve, first to the right

Simple panel for particularly dangerous curve chevron (right)

Simple panel for particularly dangerous curve chevron (left)

Successive panels for particularly dangerous curves chevrons (right)

Successive panels for particularly dangerous curve chevrons (left)

Dangerous downhill

Dangerous uphill

Uneven road

Bump

Dip

Ice or snow

Slippery road

Rockfall on the left

Rockfall on the right

Loose chippings

Crosswind on the left

Crosswind on the right

Road narrows

Road narrows on the right

Road narrows on the left

Roadworks

Busy road

End of dual carriageway

Two-way traffic

Mobile bridge

Unprotected riverbank

Traffic lights (vertical version)

Traffic lights (horizontal version)

Pedestrians ahead

Pedestrian crossing ahead

Children

Cyclists

Domesticated animals

Wild animals

Airport ahead

Buses ahead

Tramway

Accident

Dangerous hard shoulder

Tunnel ahead

Warning of fire

Level crossing with a railway with barriers

Level crossing with a railway without barriers

Single track level crossing with a railway without barriers

Two tracks level crossing with a railway without barriers

Distance of level crossing with a railway with barriers

Distance of level crossing with a railway without barriers

== Regulatory signs ==
Give way

Stop and give way

Priority road

End of priority road

Priority for oncoming traffic

Priority over oncoming traffic

No entry

All vehicles prohibited in both directions

No motor vehicles

No cars (motor vehicles with except motorcycles without attachment)

No motorcycles

No mopeds

No bike

No bus

No trucks

No vehicles carrying dangerous water pollutants

No vehicles carrying explosives

No vehicles carrying dangerous goods

No trailers

No articulated vehicles

No tractors

No animal-drawn vehicles

No equestrians

No handcarts

No pedestrians

No motor and animal-drawn vehicles

Maximum width

Maximum height

Maximum weight

Maximum weight per axle

Maximum length

Minimum safe distance

No left turn

No right turn

No U-turn

No overtaking

No overtaking by trucks

Maximum speed limit (50 km/h)

End of previous prohibitions

End of maximum speed limit (50 km/h)

End of overtaking prohibition

End of overtaking by heavy goods vehicles prohibition

No stopping

No parking

No parking in odd days

No parking in even days

Customs

Police

Toll

No use horns

End of use horns prohibition

No photography

Proceed straight

Turn left ahead

Turn right ahead

Turn left

Turn right

U-turn

Turn left or right

Proceed straight or turn left

Proceed straight or turn right

Roundabout

Pass onto left

Pass onto right

Pass on either side

Bike path

End of bike path

Equestrian path

End of equestrian path

Pedestrian path

End of pedestrian path

Pedestrian and bike path

End of pedestrian and bike path

Pedestrian and bike path

End of pedestrian and bike path

Snow chains mandatory

End of snow chains

Minimum speed limit (40 km/h)

End of minimum speed limit (50 km/h)

== Information signs ==
Pedestrian crossing

Cyclist crossing

Cyclist and pedestrian crossing

Pedestrian and cyclist crossing

Children

One-way street

One-way street

Speed limit zone

End of speed limit zone

Pedestrian zone

End of pedestrian zone

No park zone

End of no park zone

Eco zone

End of eco zone

Living street

End of living street

School zone

End of school zone

Parking zone

Parking time limit zone

End of parking zone

End of parking time limit zone

Emergency vehicle lane

Intervention path

Recommended speed (80 km/h)

End of recommended speed (80 km/h)

Speed bump

School patrol

Hospital

First aid

Parking

Parking garage

Parking time limit

Breakdown service

Emergency telephone

Petrol station

Petrol station

Drinking water

Bus stop

Tram stop

Information center

Road assistance

Airport

Port (option 1)

Park

Camping area

Camping site for caravans

Land for RVs

Vila

Fire extugisher

Road assistance

Hotel/Motel

Restaurant

Light refreshment

Public toilet

Car wash

Police

Taxi stand

Port (option 2)

Port (option 3)

Road information radio

Water protection area

Motorway

End of motorway

Expressway

End of expressway

Dead end

The road of movement of the vehicle to the intersection where it is forbidden to turn left

Emergency lay-by (option 1)

Emergency lay-by (option 2)

River

Tunnel

Bridge

Altitude of the pass

Built-up area

End of built-up area

Built-up area/End of built-up area

Signpost

Signpost

Detour/Diversion

Detour for trucks/Diversion for trucks

Use of lanes at an intersection

Pre-signaling of directions on the extra-urban road

Detour/Diversion in connection of road closure

Speed limit of North Macedonia

Border crossing (option 1)

Border crossing (option 2)

Border crossing (option 3)

Road closed due to smog

Street sign

Police

Manual traffic control

Entering the area where blind people move

Exiting the area where blind people move

European road

Mileage on the highway

Exit from motorways

Hub/Junction

Exit number

Exit on motorway (100 m)

Exit on motorway (200 m)

Exit on motorway (300 m)

Exit on expressway (200 m)

Exit on expressway (200 m)

Exit on expressway (300 m)

National identification mark

Do not block intersection

Traffic under video surveillance

Park and ride

Park and ride (option 1)

Park and ride (option 2)

Charging station for electric vehicles

Speed control

== Notice and traffic control signs ==
Pay toll ahead

Pay toll

Manual/Electronic toll collection

Pay toll (manual/electronic toll collection)

Manual toll collection

Electronic toll collection

Vehicle category

Vehicle category

Vehicle category

Vehicle category

Vehicle category

Toll payment method along the motorway

Toll payment method along the motorway
