= Road signs in Serbia =

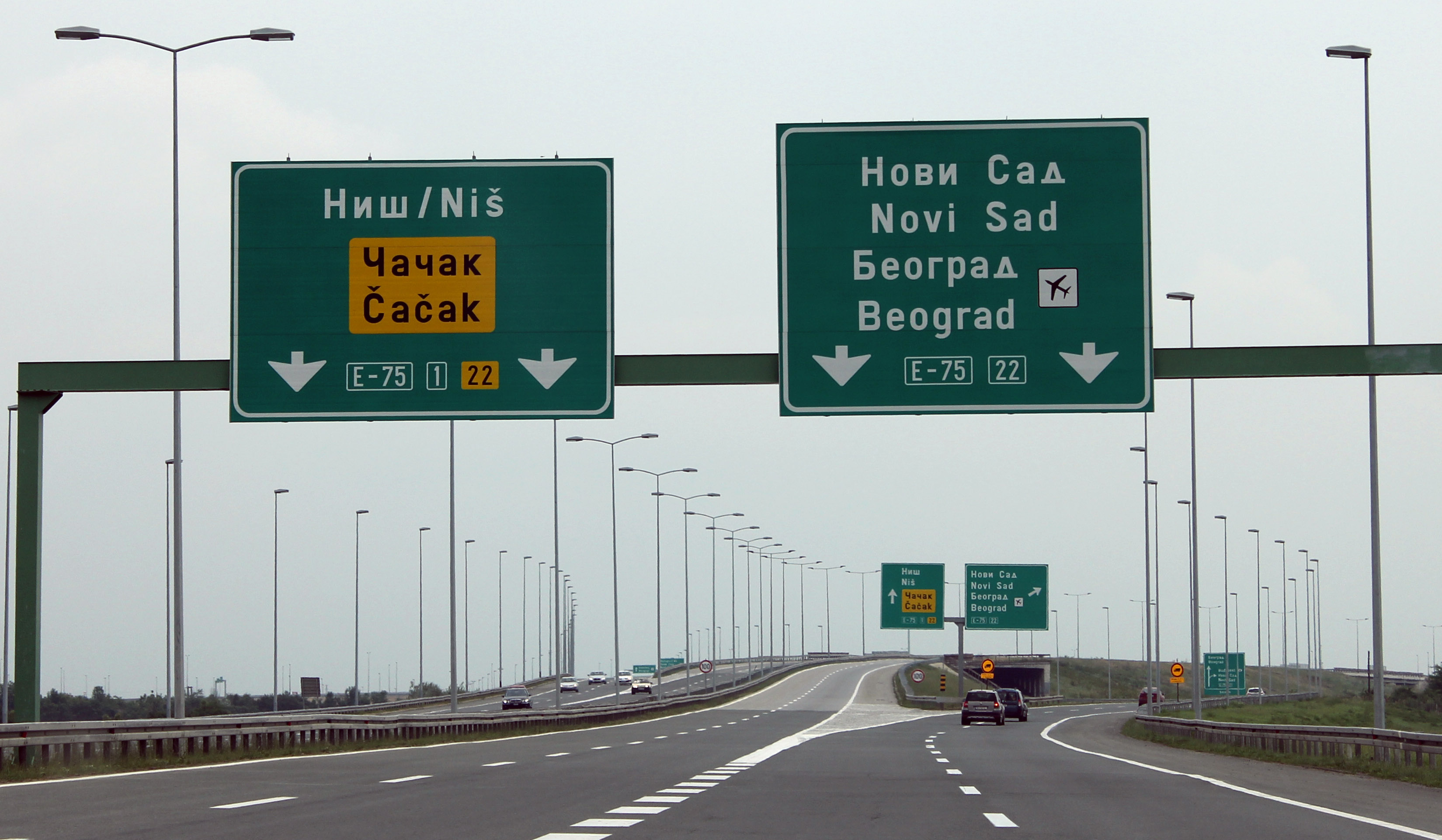
Gantry road sign on the A3 at Dobanovci interchange.

Road signs in Serbia are regulated by the Regulation of Traffic Signs (Serbian Cyrillic: Правилник о саобраћајној сигнализацији, Serbian: Pravilnik o saobraćajnoj signalizaciji), which was most recently modified in 2026.

The road signs follow the Vienna Convention on Road Signs and Signals of 1968, and the former Yugoslav standard road signs, used by the successor states of SFR Yugoslavia. Inscriptions are in both Cyrillic and Latin alphabets. The SNV typeface is used on Serbian road signs. They are also used in Kosovo, although some of these signs were superseded by the Albanian road sign system, itself a copy of the Italian road sign system.

== Warning signs ==
Curve to left

Curve to right

Double curve, first to left

Double curve, first to right

Dangerous curves ahead

Steep uphill

Steep downhill

Road narrows

Road narrows on right side

Road narrows on left side

Drawbridge

Quayside or riverbank

Uneven road

Dip

Bump

Slippery road

Loose gravel

Falling rocks from the right

Falling rocks from the left

Pedestrian crossing

Children

Cyclists

Cattle

Deer

Roadworks

Traffic light

Traffic light

Low-flying aircraft

Crosswinds from left

Crosswinds from right

Two-way traffic

Tunnel

Other dangers

Intersection with right-priority rule

Intersection on a priority road with a non-priority road

Intersection on a priority road with a non-priority road

Intersection on a priority road with a non-priority road from left

Intersection on a priority road with a non-priority road from right

Merging traffic from left

Merging traffic from right

Oblique side road with priority, from the left

Oblique side road with priority, from the right

Roundabout

Tramway

Level crossing with barriers ahead

Level crossing without barriers ahead

Single track level crossing

Multi-track level crossing

Distance panels for level crossing with barriers

Distance panels for level crossing without barriers

Pedestrians

Elderly pedestrians

Soft verges

Traffic queues

== Prohibitory signs ==
Give way

Stop

All vehicles prohibition in both directions

No entry

No motor vehicles, except motorcycles

No buses

No trucks

No vehicles carrying dangerous water pollutants

No vehicles carrying explosives

No vehicles carrying dangerous goods

No trailers

No trailers

No tractors

No motorcycles

No mopeds

No bicycles

No animal-drawn vehicles

No handcarts

No pedestrians

No motor vehicles

No motor and animal-drawn vehicles

No buses, tractors and animal-drawn vehicles

Maximum width

Maximum height

Maximum weight

Maximum weight per axle

Maximum length

Minimum following distance

No left turn

No right turn

No U-turn

No overtaking

No overtaking by trucks

Maximum speed limit

No horns

Customs

Police

Toll

Give way to oncoming traffic

No stopping

No parking

No parking in odd days

No parking in even days

== Mandatory signs ==
Minimum speed limit

Snow chains mandatory

Bike path

Pedestrian path

Segregated bike and pedestrian path

Segregated pedestrian and bike path

Combined pedestrian and bike path

Trail for riders

Proceed straight

Turn right

Turn left

Turn left ahead

Turn right ahead

Proceed straight or turn left

Proceed straight or turn right

Turn left or right

Pass onto left

Pass onto right

Pass either side

Roundabout

U-turn

Proceed straight for vehicles carrying dangerous goods

== Information signs ==
Priority over oncoming traffic

One-way street

One-way street

Priority road

End of priority road

Cyclist crossing

Pedestrian crossing

Pedestrian and cyclist crossing

Underground or overground pedestrian passage

Dead end

The road of movement of the vehicle to the intersection where it is forbidden to turn left

Uses of lanes at an intersection

County road number

Secondary road number

Marker of the section of the county road

European road

Motorway

End of motorway

Expressway

End of expressway

Entrance to locality

Built-up area

Leaving locality

End of built-up area

End of overtaking prohibition

End of overtaking by trucks prohibition

End of speed limit

End of minimum speed limit

End of using horns prohibition

End of previous prohibitions

End of snow chains mandatory

End of bike path

End of pedestrian path

End of trail for riders

End of segregated pedestrian and bike path

End of combined pedestrian and bike path

No parking zone

End of no parking zone

Parking

Parking garage

Parking enforced by meter

Park and ride

Hospital

First aid

Breakdown service

Telephone

Petrol station

Electric vehicle charging station

Hotel or motel

Restaurant

Café

Park

Camping for tents

Camping for caravans

Camping for tents and caravans

Vila

Road assistance

Fire extinguisher

Bus stop

Tram stop

Airport

Port

Information

Passability of the road

Water catchment area

Serpentine number

Altitude of the pass

Tunnel

Bridge

Viaduct

River

Police station

Recommended speed limit

End of recommended speed limit

Street sign

Chevrons

Chevrons

Chevrons

Chevrons

Children

Lane for buses

End of lane for buses

National speed limits

Low speed lane

End of low speed lane

Pedestrian zone

End of pedestrian zone

Speed limit zone

End of speed limit zone

School zone

End of school zone

Living street

End of living street

Bump

Danger

Exit board with interchange number

Exit board with interchange number

Alternating passing of vehicles

Intermittent passing of vehicles

Emergency exit

Emergency exit

Dangerous road section

Children on the road

Distance to the emergency exit

Distance to the emergency exit

Wrong way

Fog on the road

Fog on the road (recommended speed 60 km/h when 2 dots are visible)

Fog on the road (recommended speed 40 km/h when 1 dot is visible)

Speed control

Electronic toll collection

Toll collection point ahead

Traffic monitoring zone

End of traffic monitoring zone

Preliminary direction indicator (option 1)

Preliminary direction indicator (option 2)

Preliminary direction indicator (option 3)

Direction confirmation

Signpost for separating two motorways

Border crossing operating conditions

Bypass

Touristic information board

Touristic information board

Direction sign for public facilities (sport center)

== Direction signs ==
Pre-signaling of directions on extra-urban roads

Pre-signaling of directions on a non-urban road at an intersection with a roundabout

Pre-signaling of directions on extra-urban roads

Sign for extra-urban road

Signpost for main extra-urban road

Confirmation signal for motorways

Pre-signaling of directions on main extra-urban roads

Highway sign

Signpost for secondary road

Signpost for main extra-urban road

Highway bridge sign

Advance signaling of directions on the highway

Exit warning along the highway

Exit warning for motorway junction

Deviation warning

Deviation

Lane change

Reduction of available lanes

Advance notice of reduction of available lanes

Lane closed

Return to the lane

Manual traffic control

Restrictions on available lanes

Signpost for a tourist destination

== Obsolete signs ==
=== 1980s road signs ===
Pedestrian crossing

Children

Other dangers

Give way

No mopeds

No bicycles

No animal-drawn vehicles

No pedestrians

Bicycle path

Pedestrian path

Pedestrian crossing

=== 2014 road signs ===
School zone

End of school zone

Speed control

Tunnel

River

Police station

Children

National speed limits

No parking zone

End of no parking zone

Pedestrian zone

End of pedestrian zone

Speed limit zone

End of speed limit zone

== See also ==
- Road signs in Montenegro
- Road signs in Bosnia and Herzegovina
- Road signs in Croatia
