= Road signs in Croatia =

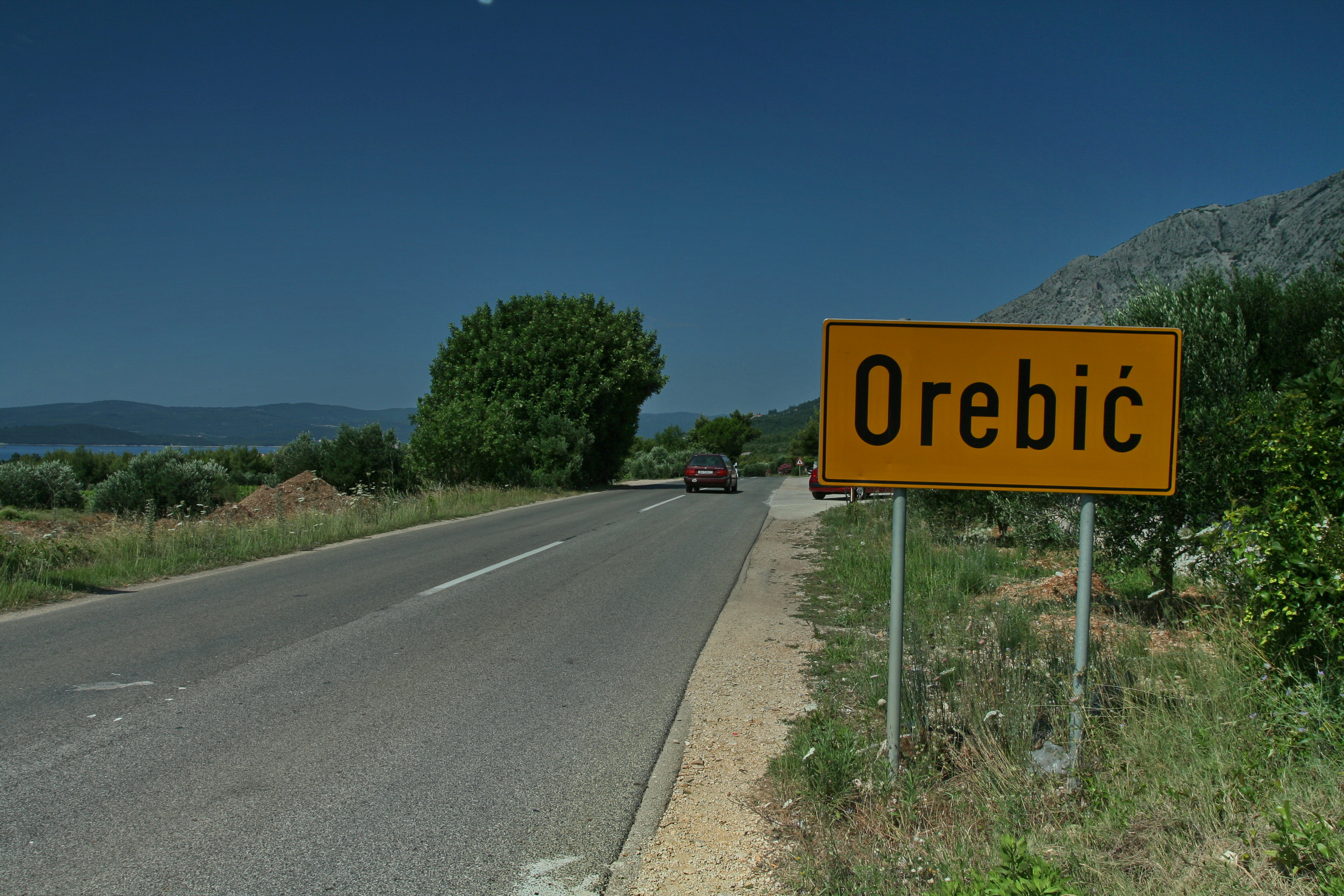
Entrance to Orebić town in Pelješac.

Road signs in Croatia are regulated in the Ordinance on traffic signs, signaling and equipment on roads (Croatian: Pravilnik o prometnim znakovima signalizaciji i opremi na cestama). The shape and design of the road signs largely follow the road signs used in most European countries.

The former Yugoslavia had originally signed the Vienna Convention on Road Signs and Signals on November 8, 1968, and ratified it on June 6, 1977. Yugoslavia formerly used a yellow background on warning signs. After the breakup of Yugoslavia when Croatia declared its independence in 1991, the country succeeded to the Vienna Convention on November 2, 1993.

Croatian signs use the Hrvatsko cestovno pismo (lit. 'Croatian road font') for the text on their signs, derived from the SNV typeface.

== Warning signs ==
A01
Other dangers

A02
Unmarked intersection ahead (Equal roads ahead)

A03
Roundabout ahead

A04
Intersection with a priority road

A04-1
Priority road ahead

A04-2
Priority road ahead

A04-3
Merging traffic ahead

A04-4
Merging traffic ahead

A05
Curve to the left

A05-1
Curve to the right

A05-2
Double curve, first to the left

A05-3
Double curve, first to the right

A06
Dangerous descent

A07
Dangerous ascent

A08
Road narrows

A08-1
Road narrows to the right

A08-2
Road narrows to the left

A09
Bump ahead

A09-1
Dip ahead

A09-2
Uneven road ahead

A09-3
Ruts ahead

A10
Slippery road

A11
Ice or snow

A12
Loose chippings

A13
Falling rocks on the road

A14
Traffic lights ahead

A14-1
Traffic lights ahead (horizontal)

A15
Roadworks

A16
Two-way traffic

A17
Traffic accident

A18
Traffic queues ahead

A19
Dangerous road shoulder

A20
Pedestrians

A21
Pedestrian crossing

A22
Children

A22-1
Children on road

A22-2
Children on road

A23
Airport

A24
Tunnel (gallery)

A25
Side wind

A26
Danger of flares

A27
Cyclists on road

A28
Opening or swinging bridge

A29
Unprotected quayside bank ahead

A30
Agricultural vehicle crossing ahead

A31
Tramway crossing ahead

A32
Cattle on road

A33
Deer on road

A34
Railway crossing with barriers ahead

A35
Railway crossing without barriers ahead

A36
Advanced warning for an approaching railway crossing with barriers

A36-1
Advanced warning for an approaching railway crossing without barriers

A36-2
Waning board for 240 meters until the railway crossing

A36-3
Warning board for 160 meters until the railway crossing

A36-4
Warning board for 80 meters until the railway crossing

A36-5
Advanced warning for an approaching railway crossing with barriers (left side)

A36-6
Advanced warning for an approaching railway crossing without barriers (left side)

A36-7
Warning board for 240 meters until the railway crossing (left side)

A36-8
Warning board for 160 meters until the railway crossing (left side)

A36-9
Warning board for 80 meters until the railway crossing (left side)

A37
Warning cross on a railway crossing with a single track

A37-1
Warning cross on a railway crossing with two or more tracks

A38
Vehicle moves in the opposite direction on roads with multiple lanes ahead

A39
Railway crossing on the side road ahead

A39-1
Railway crossing on the side road ahead

== Regulatory signs ==
B01
Give way

B02
Stop and give way

B05
Give way to oncoming traffic

B04
No entry for all vehicles on a one-way road in an opposite direction

B03
No entry for all vehicles except pedestrians

B20
No entry for motor vehicles

B06
No entry for motor vehicles expect for motorcycles without a trailer

B15
No entry for motorcycles

B17
No entry for bicycles

B16
No entry for mopeds and bicycles

B07
No entry for buses

B08
No entry for trucks

B09
No entry for vehicles with dangerous goods, which may cause water pollution (tankers)

B10
No entry for vehicles with explosive or flammable goods

B11
No entry for vehicles with dangerous goods

B12
No entry for vehicles with trailers

B13
No entry for cargo vehicles with trailers

B14
No entry for tractors

B18
No entry for horse-drawn vehicles

B21
No entry for pedestrians

B22
Width limit

B23
Height limit

B24
Weight limit

B25
Weight per axle limit

B26
Length limit

B27
Minimum distance between vehicles

B28
No left turn

B28-1
No right turn

B29
No U-turn

B30
Speed limit (30 km/h)

B30
Speed limit (50 km/h)

B31
No overtaking

B32
No overtaking by trucks

B33
Customs

B33-1
Toll road

B33-2
Police

B34
No giving sound signals

B35
No camera devices

B36
No stopping or parking

B37
No parking

B38
Minimum speed limit (40 km/h)

B39
Winter chains

B40
Bicycle path

B41
Pedestrian path

B42
Divided bicycle and pedestrian path

B42
Divided bicycle path and pedestrian path

B43
Combined bicycle and pedestrian path

B44
Riding path for horses

B45
Go straight

B45-1
Turn right

B45-2
Turn left

B45-3
Turn left

B45-4
Turn right

B45-5
U-turn permitted

B45-6
Roundabout

B46
Go straight or turn left

B46-1
Go straight or turn right

B46-2
Turn left or right

B47
Keep right

B47-1
Keep left

B47-2
Keep on both sides

B48
Turn on lights

== Information signs ==
C01
Priority over oncoming traffic

C02
Pedestrian crossing

C02-1
Bicycle crossing

C03
Children on road

C04
Pedestrian underpass or overpass

C05
One-way road

C05-1
One-way road on the side (left)

C05-2
One-way road on the side (right)

C06
Priority road

C07
End of priority road

C08
Speed bump

C09
End of overtaking

C10
End of overtaking by trucks

C11
End of maximum speed limit

C12
End of minimum speed limit

C13
End of giving sound signals

C14
End of all restrictions

C15
End of winter chains

C16
End of bicycle path

C17
End of pedestrian path

C18
End of divided bicycle and pedestrian path

C18
End of divided bicycle and pedestrian path

C19
End of combined bicycle and pedestrian path

C20
End of riding path for horses

C21
Turn off lights (End of turning on lights)

C22
Speed limit zone

C23
End of speed limit zone

C24
No parking zone

C25
End of no parking zone

C26
Pedestrian zone

C27
End of pedestrian zone

C28
Residential zone

C29
End of residential zone

C30
Green surface for pedestrians and bicycles

C31
Blind pedestrian zone

C32
End of blind pedestrian zone

C33
Recommended speed

C34
End of recommended speed

C35
School patrol

C36
Hospital

C37
First aid or hospital

C38
Police

C39
Parking

C39-1
Covered parking (garage)

C39-2
Parking with parking meter

C41
Phone

C41-1
Emergency phone

C42
Gas station

C42-1
LPG gas station

C42-2
CNG gas station

C42-3
Charging station for electric vehicles

C43
Information

C44
Hotel or motel

C45
Restaurant

C45-1
Food and accommodation facility

C46
Drinkable water

C47
Bus or trolleybus stop

C48
Tram stop

C49
Taxi stop

C50
Airport

C51
Water port

C51-1
Ferry

C52
Marina port

C53
Buffet or confectionery

C54
Camping for tent

C54-1
Camping for residential trailers

C54-2
Camping for campervans

C54-3
Place for wasting water discharge from vehicles

C55
Rest stop

C56
Youth hostel

C57
Fire extinguisher

C58
Technical road assistance

C59
Vehicle repair shop

C59-1
Tire shop

C60
WC

C61
Carwash

C62
Traffic radio station

C63
Water protection area

C64
Motorway

C65
End of motorway

C66
Road for motor vehicles (expressway)

C67
End of road for motor vehicles (expressway)

C68
Dead end

C69
Traffic section where the left turn is prohibited

C70
Emergency lane

C70-1
Emergency lane with a emergency phone

C71
Mountain pass

C72
River name

C73
Road structure (tunnel)

C74
Road structure (bridge)

C75
Wildlife crossing

C76
Settlement

C77
End of settlement

C78
Signpost

C78-1
Signpost

C80
Signpost for an airport

C81
Signpost for a motorway or road for motor vehicles (expressway)

C81-1
Directional sign for an motorway or a road for motor vehicles (expressway)

C83
Lane change

C83-1
Lane change

C83-2
Space for bicycles at the intersection

C84
Public transport lane begins

C85
Public transport lane ends

C86
Public transport lane

C87
Lane begins

C88
Lane ends

C89
Slow vehicles lane

C90
End of slow vehicles lane

C92
Exit board

C93
Rest stop

C93-1
Rest stop

C95
Prohibition of certain types of vehicles on a motorway or a road for motor vehicles (expressway)

C96
Toll road

C97
Toll road ahead

C98
Vehicle lineup in front of the toll facility

C99
Mandatory taking of a toll ticket

C99-1
Toll booth

C99-2
Electronic toll payment

C99-3
Cash toll payment

C99-4
Smart card toll payment

C105
Manual traffic control ahead

C108
Number of lanes for certain vehicles

C108-1
Number of lanes with an restriction

C109
General speed limits

C110
Highway intersection number

C111
International road number (European route)

C112
Motorway number

C113
State road number

C113-1
County road number

C114
Kilometer sign for motorways and roads for motor vehicles (expressways)

C115
Kilometer sign for state roads

C115-1
Kilometer sign for county roads

C119
STOP! Wrong way

C120
Emergency exit

C121
Distance to emergency exit

C122
Speed control

C123
Traffic control

C124
National car sticker for an simplified country identification

C125
Border of the Republic of Croatia

C126
Mandatory direction for certain vehicles

C127-2
Mandatory direction for vehicles with dangerous goods

C128
Intervention passage

C129
International facility border for the country's economy (EU/EEA/CH)

C129-1
All passports must drive-through the area

== Direction signs ==
D01
Exit from a motorway or a road for motor vehicles (expressways)

D02
Interregional motorway intersection

D03
Intersection signboard

D03-1
Intersection signboard (side road)

D03-2
Intersection signboard (in shape of an roundabout)

D04
Advanced pre-signpost board for exiting to another road

D05
Pre-signpost for directing traffic in different locations

D06
Pre-signpost for exit to another road

D06-1
Pre-signpost for exit to another road

D07
Signpost board for directing traffic in different locations

D08
Traffic portal signpost for directing traffic to different locations

D08-1
Traffic portal signpost for directing traffic to different locations

D09
Direction confirmation board for distancing in kilometres to different locations

== Additional panels ==
E01
Distance

E02
Distance and length

E02-1
Distance to STOP

E05
Text or symbol

E06
Vehicle categories (truck)

E06-1
Vehicle categories (truck with a trailer)

E06-3
Vehicle categories (bus))

E06-4
Vehicle categories (car)

E06-5
Vehicle categories (car with a trailer)

E06-6
Vehicle categories (tram)

E06-7
Vehicle categories (motorcyle)

E08
Tow away

E09
Direction and distance

E09-1
Direction and distance

E09-2
Direction and distance

E09-3
Section begins for parking or stopping prohibition

E09-4
Middle section for parking or stopping prohibition

E09-5
Section ends for parking or stopping prohibition

E10
Parking position

E10-2
Parking position

E10-3
Parking position

E26
Parking position

E10-5
Parking position

E10-6
Parking position

E10-7
Parking position

E10-8
Parking position

E11
Reserved for invalid carts (or wheelchairs)

E12
Reserved for Croatian Army vehicles

E13
Rain

E13-1
Ice or snow

E14
Priority road direction (with Priority road)

E14-1
Priority road direction (with Give way or Stop and give way)

E15
Senior people

E15-1
Blind people

E16
Snowplows may appear

E17
Painting road markings

E18
Ruts ahead for … kilometres

E19
Speed bump

E21
Smog regulation restricted

E22
Rewind the engine when entering the vehicle

== Retired signs ==
E41
Accident (2005)

E42
Amphibians (2005)

E45
Gas station for CNG and LPG (2005)

E46
Exit from highways and roads for motor vehicles (2005)

E47
Highway junction (2005)

== See also ==
- Road signs in Serbia
- Road signs in Bosnia and Herzegovina
- Road signs in Montenegro
