= Road signs in Montenegro =

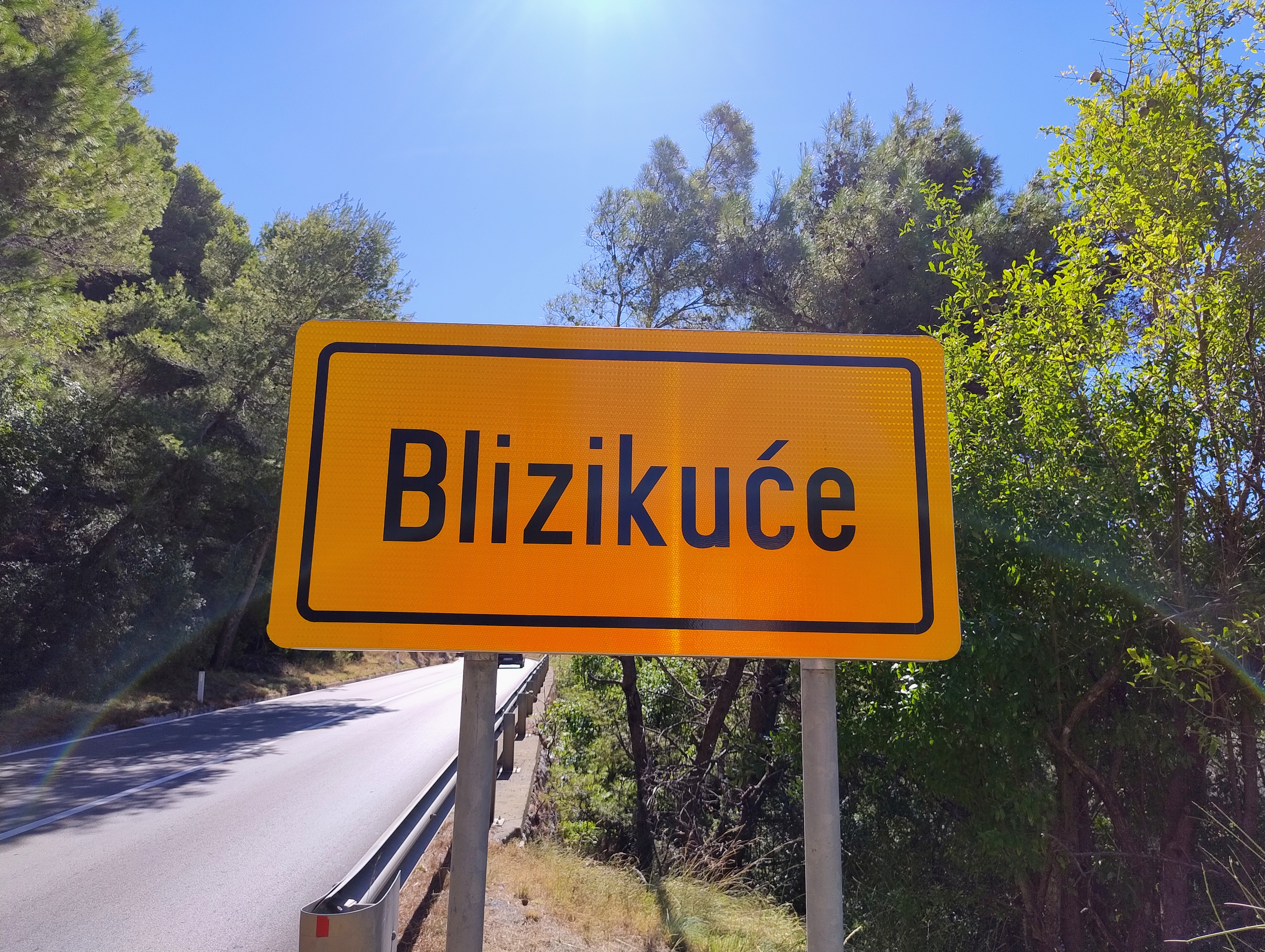
Entry to the village of Blizikuće.

Road signs in Montenegro are regulated in the Ordinance on Traffic Signals (Pravilnik o saobraćajnoj signalizaciji).

Road signs in Montenegro follow the 1968 Vienna Convention on Road Signs and Signals, and the former Yugoslav standard road signs, used by the successor states of SFR Yugoslavia. Since Serbia and Montenegro were one state from 1992 to 2006 after the breakup of Yugoslavia, road signs in Montenegro are mostly similar to Serbian ones, except that the inscriptions are only written in Latin script. Following Montenegro's declaration of independence in 2006, the country's own road sign standard was adopted. With the adoption of the Constitution of Montenegro in 2007, in which the newly formed Montenegrin was promoted as an "official language", all public inscriptions, including road signs, began to be written in Latin script. Despite the equality of the Cyrillic and Latin alphabets in Montenegro, as stated in the country’s Constitution, inscriptions on road signs are written exclusively in Latin script.

The SNV typeface is used on Montenegrin road signs.

The former Yugoslavia had originally signed the Vienna Convention on Road Signs and Signals on November 8, 1968 and ratified it on June 6, 1977. Yugoslavia formerly used a yellow background on warning signs. After Montenegro declared its independence, the country succeeded to the Vienna Convention on October 23, 2006.

== Warning signs ==
I-1
Left curve

I-1.1
Right curve

I-2
Double curve, first at left

I-2.1
Double curve, first at right

I-2.2
Series of dangerous twists

I-3
Steep uphill

I-4
Steep downhill

I-5
Road narrows

I-5.1
Road narrows on left

I-5.2
Road narrows on right

I-6
Mobile bridge

I-7
Quayside

I-8
Bumpy road

I-9
Potholes

I-10
Traffic-calming bumps

I-11
Slippery roads

I-12
Loose chippings

I-13
Rockfall

I-13.1
Rockfall

I-14
Pedestrian crossing

I-15
Children area

I-16
Cyclists crossing

I-17
Domestic animal crossing

I-18
Wild animal crossing

I-19
Roadworks

I-20
Vertical traffic light

I-20.1
Horizontal traffic light

I-21
Low-flying aircraft

I-22
Crosswinds from left

I-22.1
Crosswinds from right

I-23
Bidirectional road traffic

I-24
Tunnel

I-25
Other dangers

I-26
Intersection with right-priority rule

I-27
Intersection on a priority road with a non-priority road

I-28
Intersection on a priority road with a non-priority road from left

I-28.1
Intersection on a priority road with a non-priority road from right

I-29
Merging traffic from left

I-29.1
Merging traffic from right

I-30
Roundabout

I-31
Tram crossing

I-32
Gated level crossing

I-33
Non-gated level crossing

I-34
Crossbuck

I-34.1
Crossbuck

I-35
Distance-panels for gated level crossing

I-36
Distance-panels for non-gated level crossing

I-37
Dangerous shoulder

I-38
Traffic queues likely

I-39
Ice on road

I-40
Accident

I-41
Pedestrians on the road

I-42
Fire danger

I-43
Fog

== Order signs ==
=== Prohibitory signs ===
II-1
Give way

II-2
Stop

II-3
Forbidden for road vehicles

II-4
No entry

II-5
Forbidden for motor vehicles, except solo motorcycles

II-6
Forbidden for buses and coaches

II-7
Forbidden for HGVs (lorries/trucks)

II-8
Forbidden for water-pollutants

II-9
Forbidden for explosive goods

II-9.1
Forbidden for dangerous goods

II-10
Forbidden for trailers

II-10.1
Forbidden for articulated vehicles

II-11
Forbidden for agricultural vehicles

II-12
Forbidden for motorcycles

II-13
Forbidden for mopeds

II-14
Forbidden for bicycles

II-15
Forbidden for electric scooters

II-16
Forbidden for horsecarts

II-17
Forbidden for human-powered vehicles

II-18
Forbidden for pedestrians

II-19
Forbidden for all motor vehicles

II-19.1
Forbidden for motor vehicles, motorcycles, and horsecarts

II-19.2
Forbidden for buses, coaches, agricultural machinery and horsecarts

II-20
Width limit

II-21
Height

II-22
Maximum weight

II-23
Maximum weight per axles

II-24
Maximum length

II-25
Safe distance

II-26
No left turn

II-26.1
No right turn

II-27
No U-turn

II-28
No overtaking

II-29
No overtaking for HGVs and buses

II-30
Speed limit

II-31
Honking forbidden

II-32
Customs

II-32.1
Police

II-32.2
Toll

II-33
Yield to oncoming traffic

II-34
No stopping

II-35
No parking

II-36
No parking on odd days

II-36.1
No parking on even days

=== Mandatory signs ===
II-37
Minimum speed limit

II-38
Snow chains mandatory

II-39
Bike path

II-40
Pedestrian path

II-41
Pedestrian and bike path

II-41.1
Pedestrian and bike path

II-42
Trail for riders

II-43
Proceed straight

II-43.1
Turn right

II-43.2
Turn left

II-43.3
Turn left ahead

II-43.4
Turn right ahead

II-44
Proceed straight or turn left

II-44.1
Proceed straight or turn right

II-44.2
Turn left or right

II-45
Pass onto right

II-45.1
Pass onto left

II-45.2
Pass either side

II-46
Roundabout

== Information signs ==
III-1
Priority over oncoming traffic

III-2
One-way street

III-2.1
One-way street

III-3
Priority road

III-4
End of priority road

III-6
Pedestrian crossing

III-8
Underground or overground pedestrian passage

III-9
Dead end

III-10
The road of movement of the vehicle to the intersection where it is forbidden to turn left

III-11
Uses of lanes at an intersection

III-12
End of overtaking prohibition

III-13
End of overtaking by trucks prohibition

III-14
End of speed limit

III-15
End of minimum speed limit

III-16
End of using horns prohibition

III-17
End of snow chains mandatory

III-18
End of bike path

III-19
End of pedestrian path

III-20
End of pedestrian and bike path

III-20.1
End of pedestrian and bike path

III-21
End of trail for riders

III-22
End of previous prohibitions

III-23a
European route number

III-23b
National route number

III-24
Marker of the section of the county road

III-25
Motorway

III-26
End of motorway

III-27
Expressway

III-28
End of expressway

III-29
Locality

III-30
End of locality

III-31
Built-up area

III-32
End of built-up area

III-33
No parking zone

III-34
End of no parking zone

III-35
Parking

III-35.1
Parking garage

III-36
Parking time limit

III-36.1
Park and ride

III-37
Hospital

III-38
First aid

III-39
Breakdown service

III-40
Telephone

III-41
Petrol station

III-42
Hotel or motel

III-43
Restaurant

III-44
Cafe

III-45
Park

III-46
Camping for tents

III-47
Camping for caravans

III-48
Camping for tents and caravans

III-49
Vila

III-50
Road assistance

III-51
Fire extinguisher

III-52
Bus stop

III-53
Tram stop

III-54
Airport

III-55
Port

III-56
Information

III-56.1
Radio station

III-57
Taxi

III-58
Toilet

III-59
Passability of the road

III-60
Serpentine number

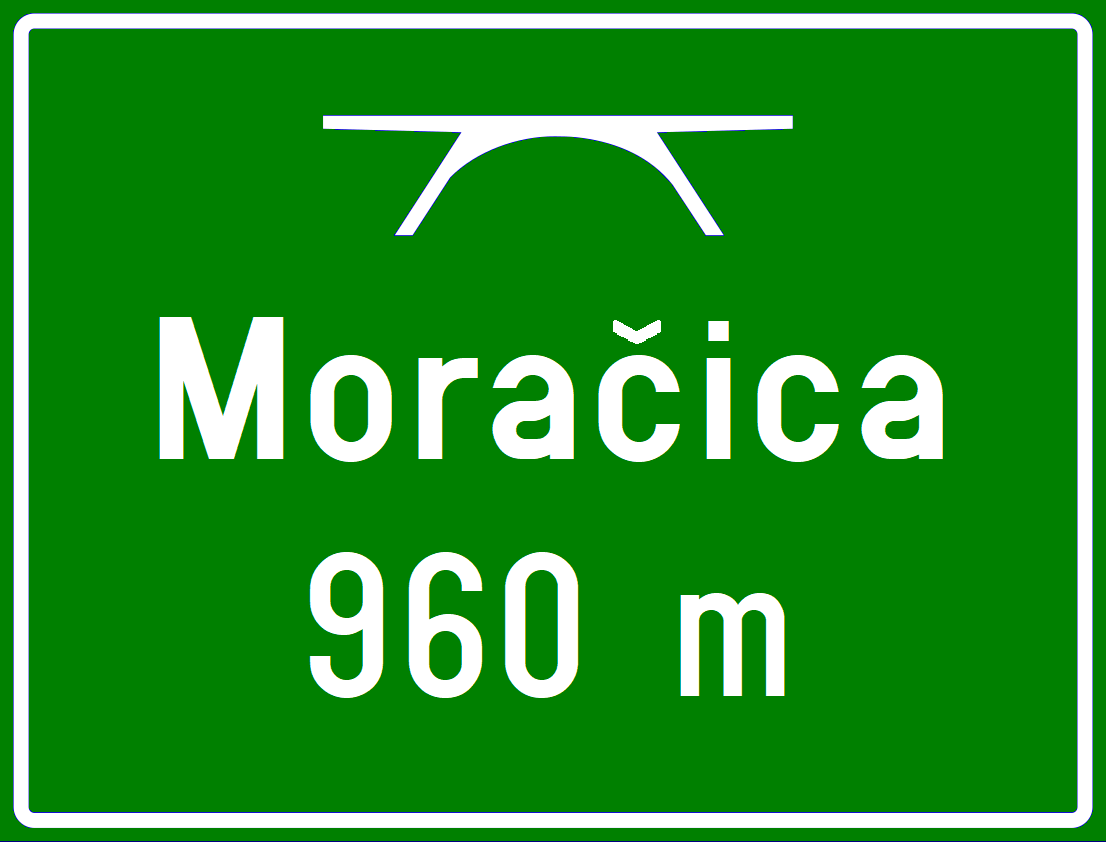
III-61
Bridge

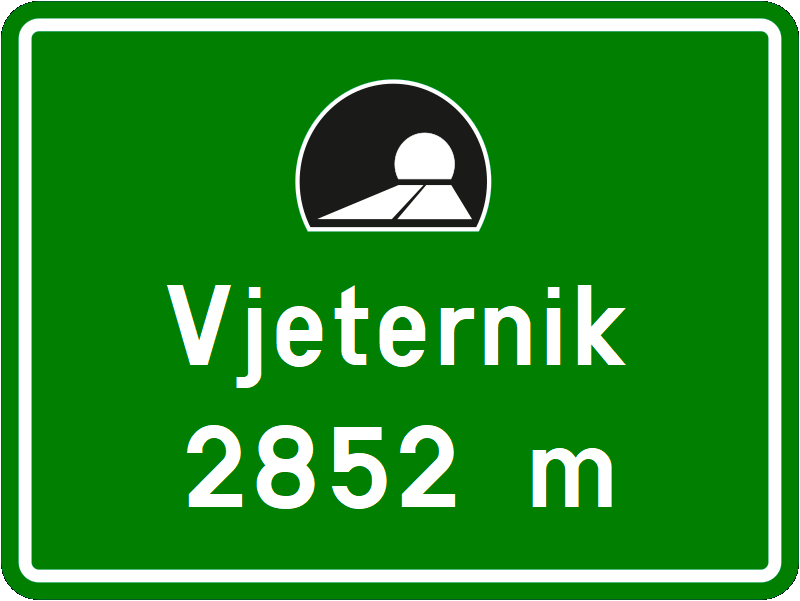
III-62
Tunnel

III-65
Police station

III-66
Recommended speed limit

III-67
Street sign

III-68
Chevrons

III-68.1
Chevrons

III-68.2
Chevrons

III-68.3
Chevrons

III-69
Lane for buses

III-70
End of lane for buses

III-71
Beginning of traffic lane

III-72
End of traffic lane

III-73
Third lane

III-74
End of third lane

III-75
Emergency stopping lane

III-77
Maximum speed limit on the roads in Montenegro

III-78
Pedestrian zone

III-79
End of pedestrian zone

III-80
Speed limit zone

III-81
End of speed limit zone

III-82
Bump

III-83
Children on the road

III-84
Living street

III-85
End of living street

III-86
School zone

III-87
End of school zone

III-88
Alternating passing of vehicles

III-89
Intermittent passing of vehicles

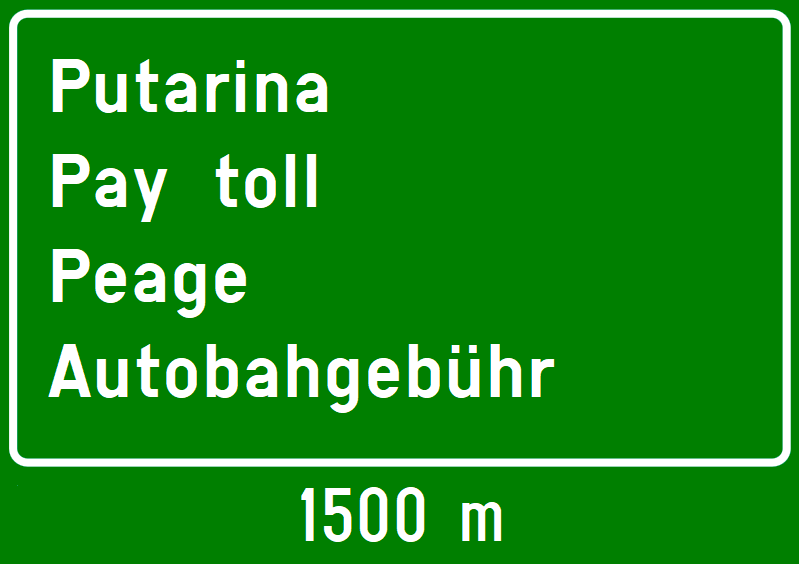
III-93
Pay toll

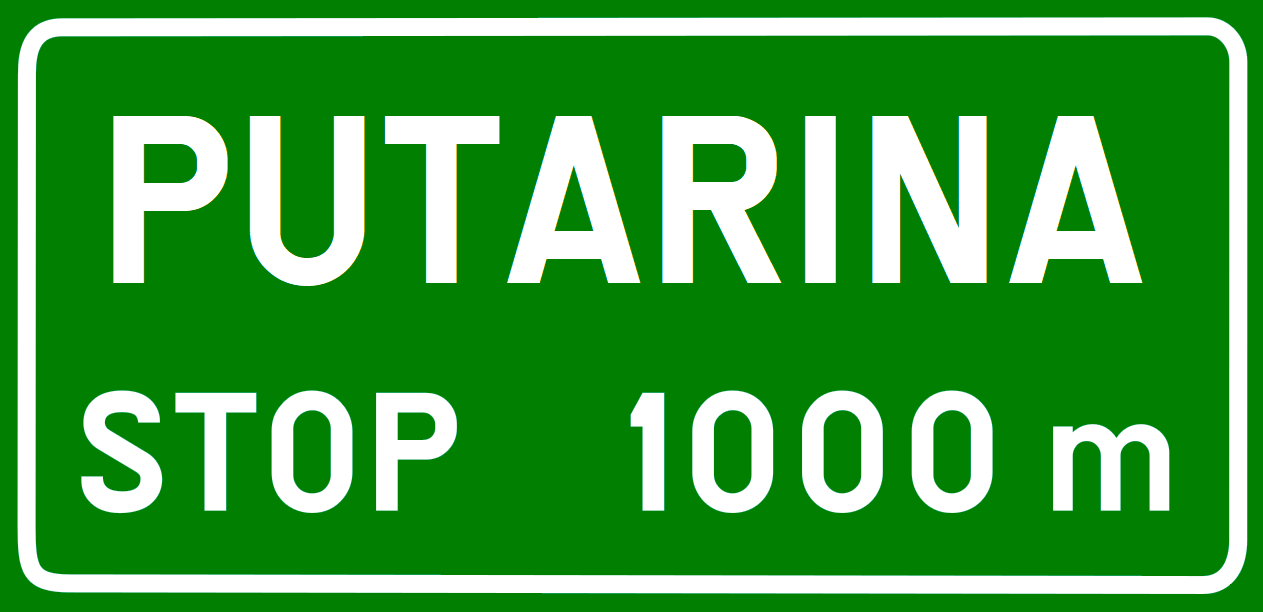
III-94
Toll collection facility

III-95
Wrong way (Pogrešan smjer)

III-96
Emergency exit

III-96.1
Emergency exit

III-97
Distance to the emergency exit

III-97.1
Distance to the emergency exit

== Information signs for traffic management ==
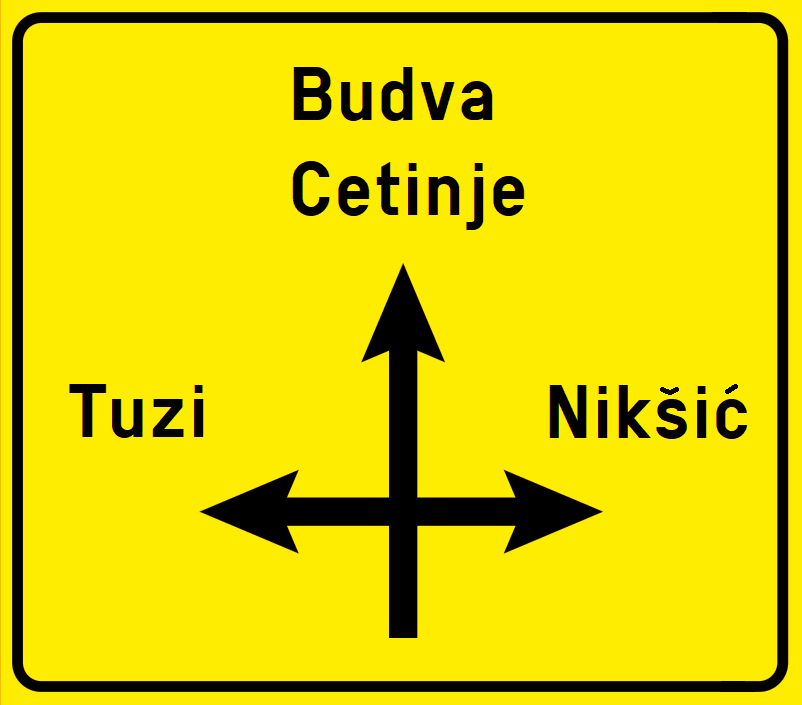
III-201
An intersection

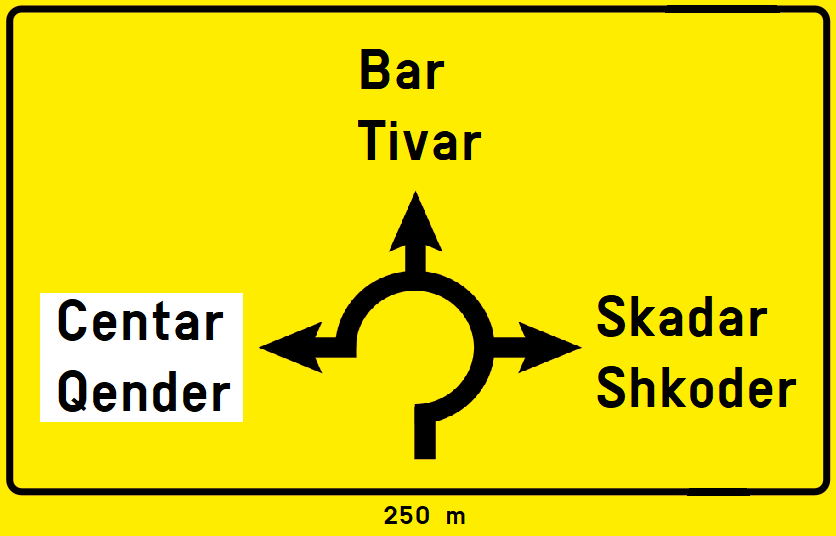
III-201.1
A roundabout intersection

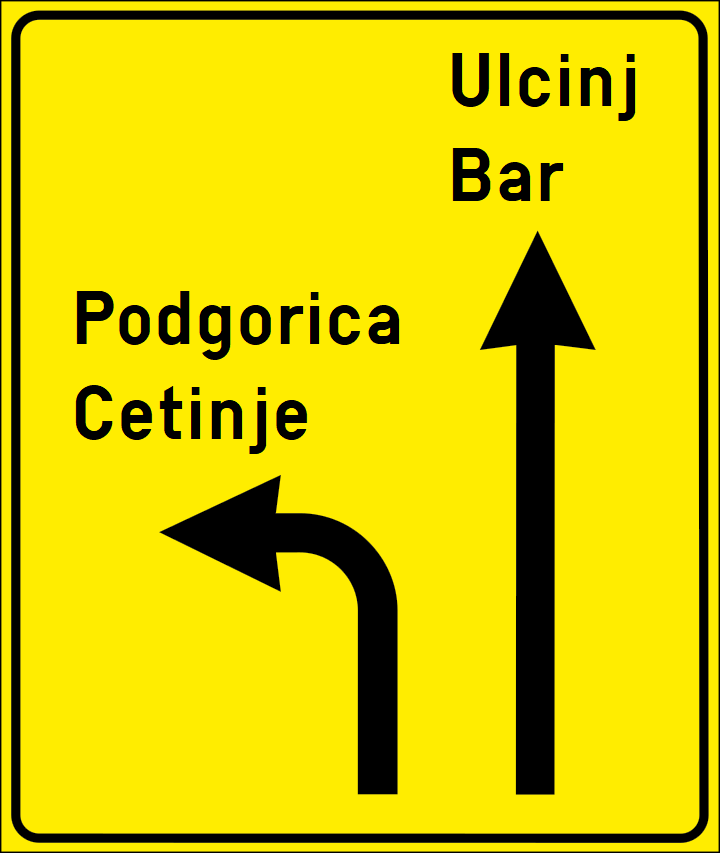
III-202
Lane change with settlement directions

III-203
Arrow signpost

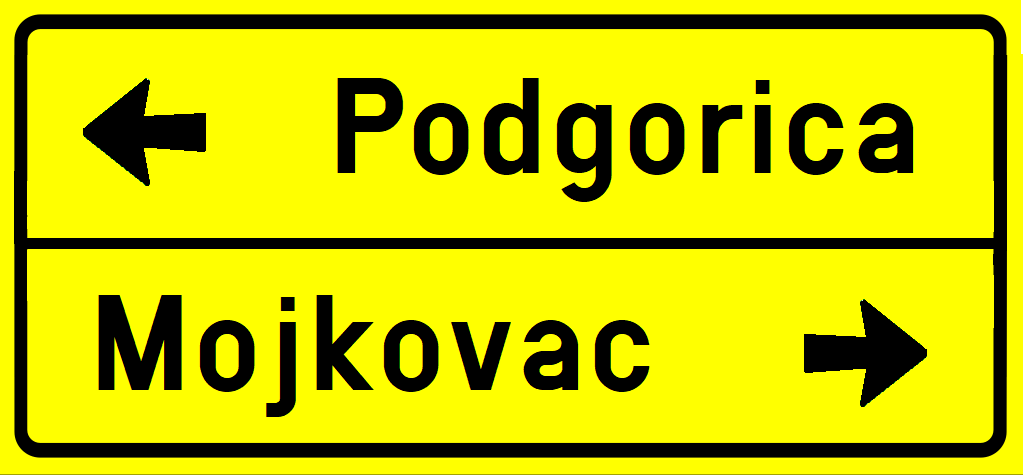
III-204
Road sign board

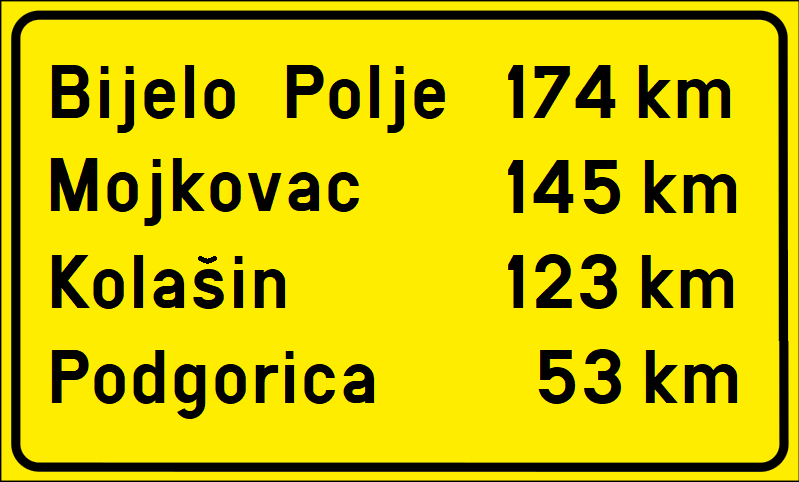
III-205
Direction confirmation

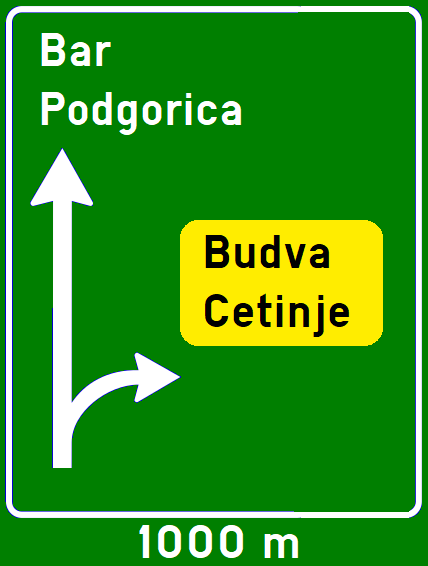
III-206
Pre-signaling of directions on the Highway

III-207
Signpost for the exit

III-210
Countdown beacon (100 m)

III-210
Countdown beacon (200 m)

III-210
Countdown beacon (300 m)

III-211
Exit sign board (expressways)

III-211.1
Exit sign board (motorways)

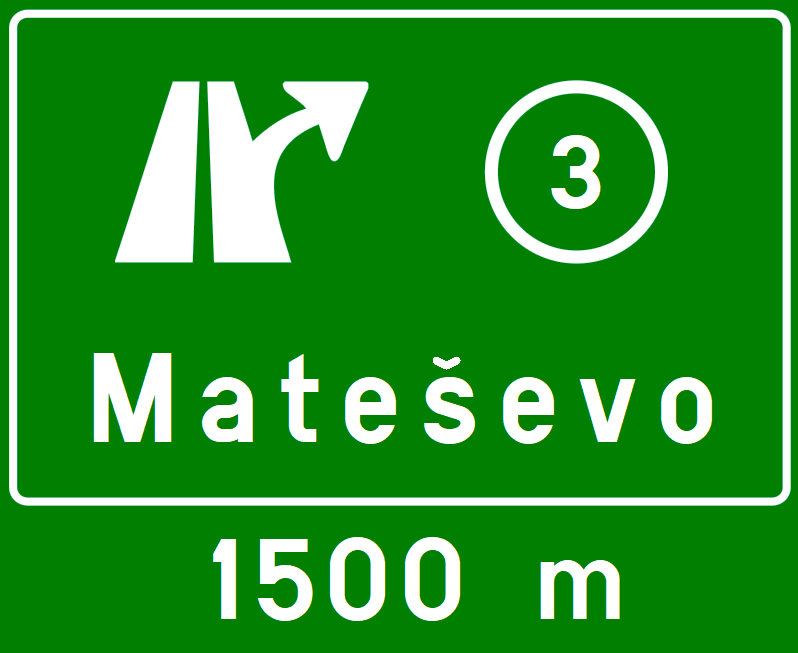
III-212
Distance to junction

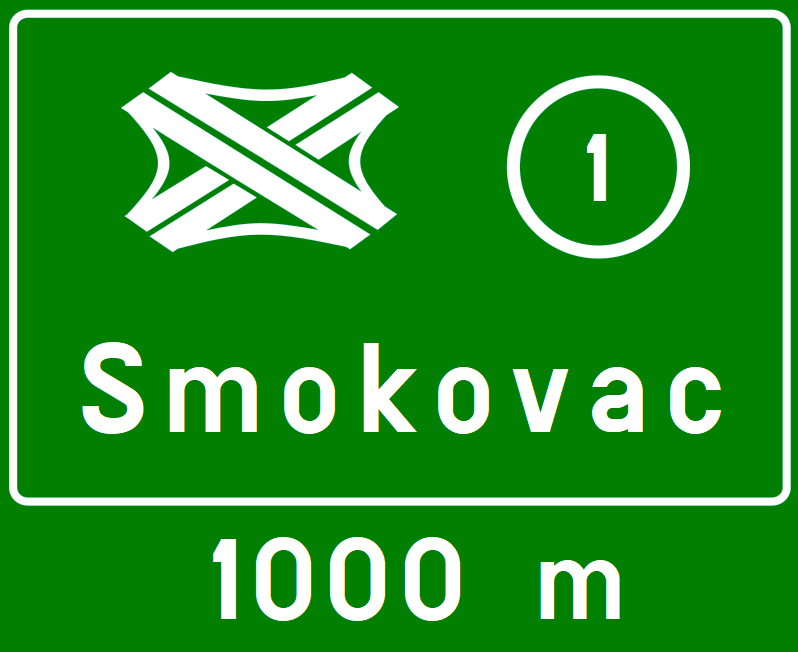
III-212.1
Distance to junction

== Tourist signs ==
III-401
Expression of welcome when entering the country

III-401.1
Greeting when leaving the country

III-402
Expression of welcome when entering the territory of the municipality

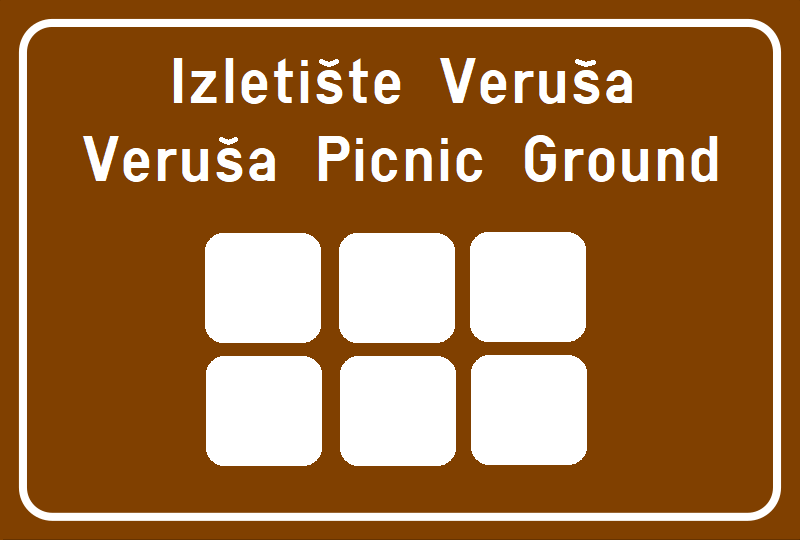
III-403
Expression of welcome when entering other destinations

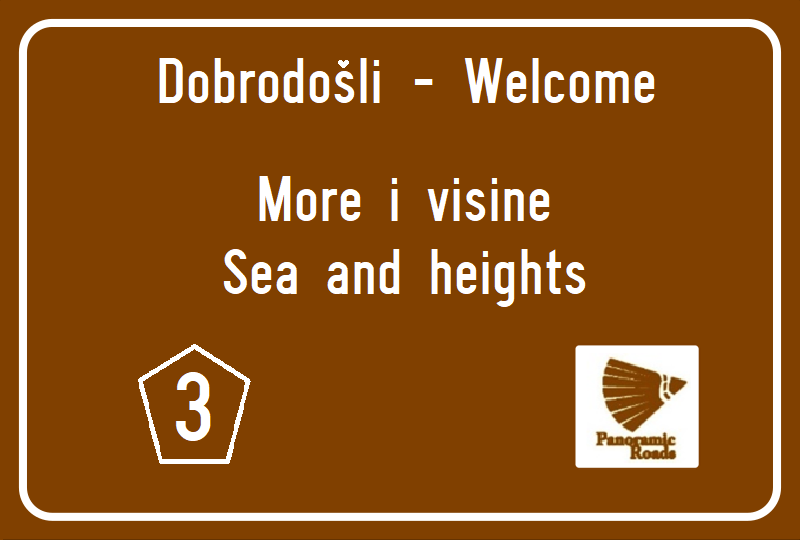
III-404
Expression of welcome when entering the thematic scenic route

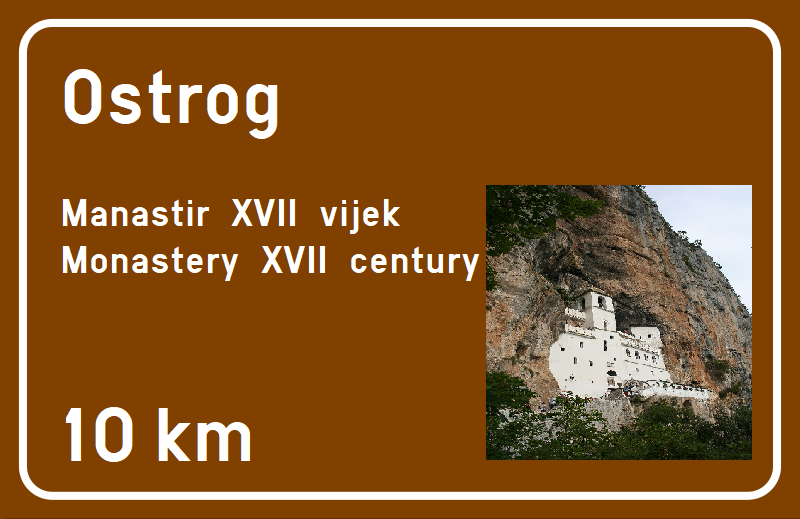
III-405
Tourist information board

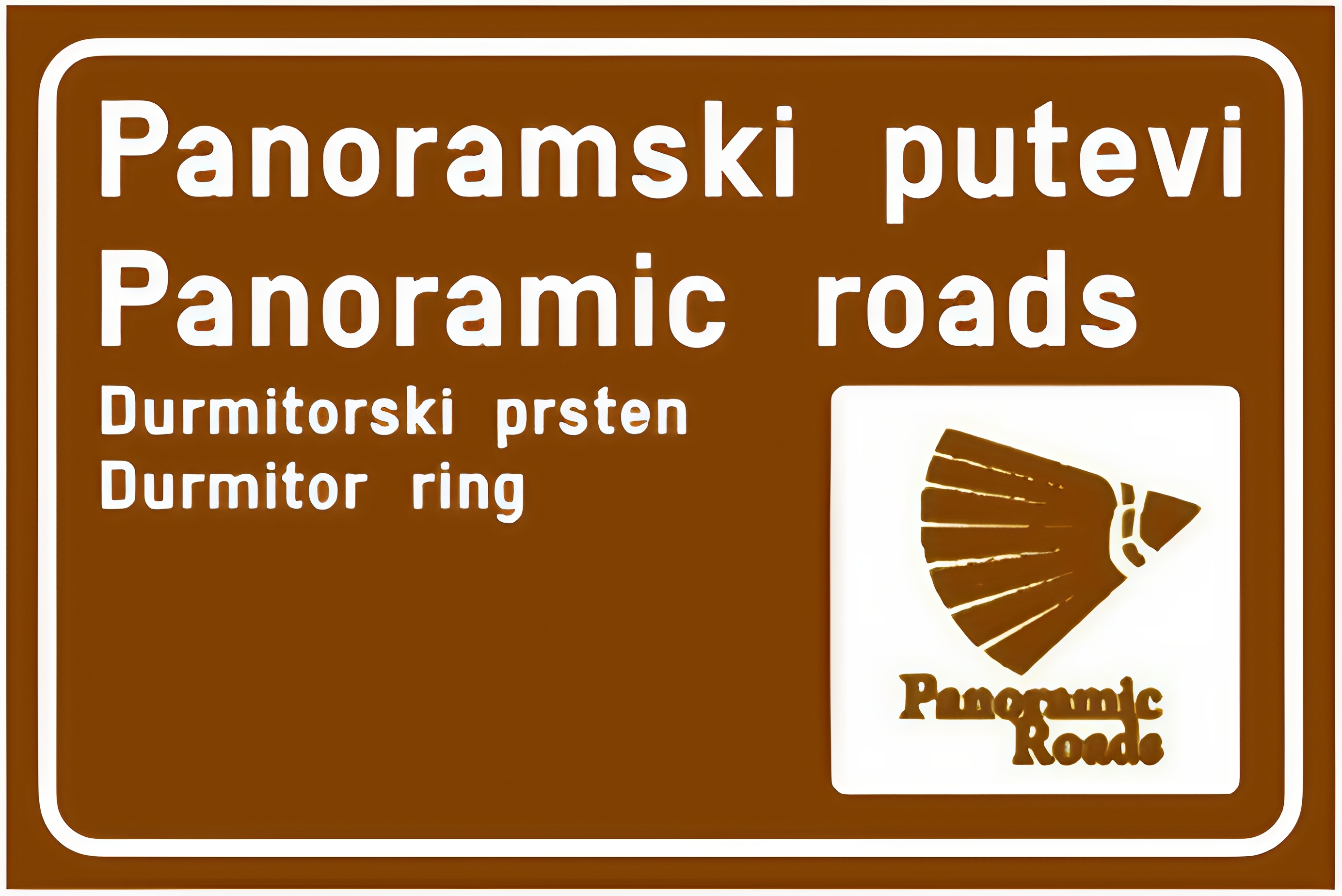
III-406
Scenic route

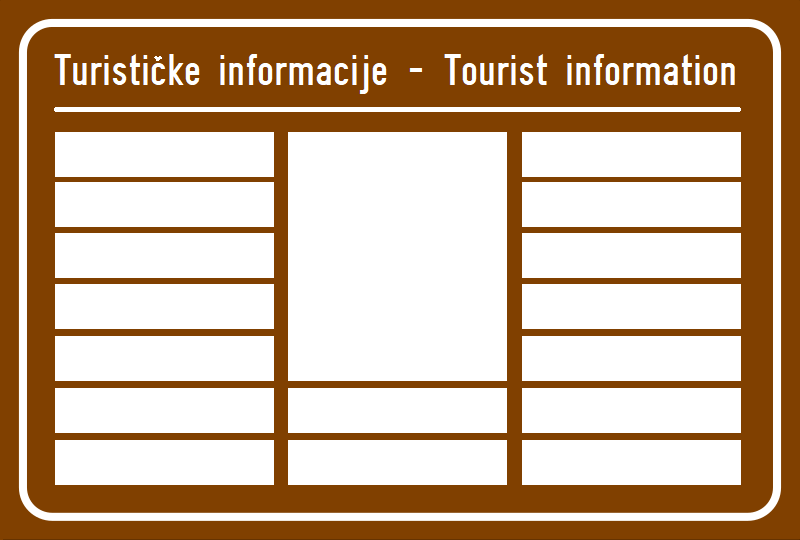
III-407
Tourist information board

III-408
Tourist direction sign

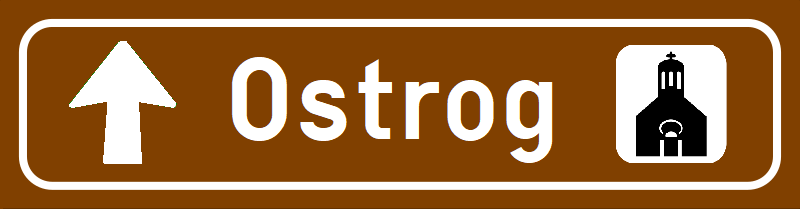
III-409
Tourist signboard

III-410
Tourist signboard in a settlement

III-410.1
Tourist signboard in a settlement

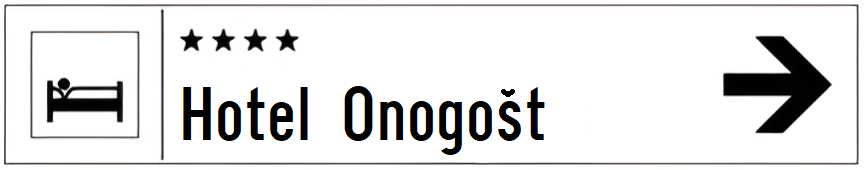
III-411
Tourist sign boards

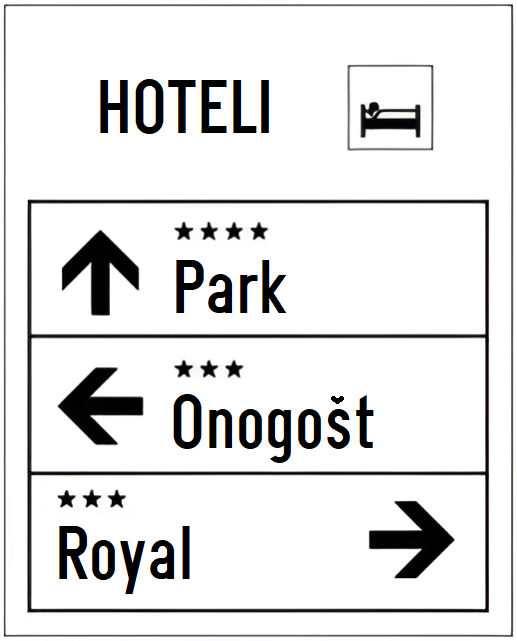
III-411.1
Tourist sign boards

== Additional signs ==
IV-1
Distance

IV-2
Distance

IV-3
Distance

IV-3.1
Distance

IV-4
Additional distance

IV-4.1
Additional distance

IV-5
Parking method

IV-5.1
Parking method

IV-5.2
Parking method

IV-5.3
Parking method

IV-5.4
Parking method

IV-5.5
Parking method

IV-5.6
Parking method

IV-5.7
Parking method

IV-5.8
Parking method

IV-6
Priority road direction

IV-6.1
Stop ahead

IV-8
Side extension (of parking or stopping ban)

IV-8.1
Side extension (of parking or stopping ban)

IV-8.2
Side extension (of parking or stopping ban)

IV-8.3
Start

IV-8.4
Continue

IV-8.5
End

IV-9
Duration

IV-10
Number of dangerous turns

IV-11
Painting stripes on the road

IV-12
Speed bump

IV-13
Elderly people

IV-14
Directions to parking

IV-15
Road closed due to smog

IV-16
Road conditions

IV-16.1
Road conditions

IV-16.2
Road conditions

IV-17
Vehicle categories

IV-18
Lateral distance

IV-19
Parking place for handicapped persons

IV-20
Limitation of the permitted maximum mass

IV-21
Accident

IV-22
Snowplow

== See also ==
- Road signs in Serbia
- Road signs in Bosnia and Herzegovina
- Road signs in Croatia
