= SNV (typeface) =

Geometric sans-serif typeface

- Category: Sans-serif
- Classification: Geometric
- Designer: Association of Swiss Road Traffic Experts (Vereinigung Schweizerischer Strassenfachleute, VSS)
- Date released: 1972

SNV, also known as VSS, is a sans-serif typeface used on road signs in several European countries. It was originally designed in Switzerland as a font for its road signs. It was originally defined by the Association of Swiss Road Traffic Experts (German: Vereinigung Schweizerischer Strassenfachleute, VSS) and the Swiss Association for Standardization (German: Schweizerische Normen-Vereinigung, SNV).

== History ==
SNV was replaced on road signs in Switzerland by ASTRA-Frutiger in 2003. It is still used on road signs in Belgium, Bulgaria, Luxembourg, Romania and the countries of the former Yugoslavia (Bosnia and Herzegovina, Croatia, Kosovo, North Macedonia, Montenegro, Serbia and Slovenia).

== See also ==
- List of public signage typefaces
