= Cyclist crossing =

Place designated for cyclists to cross a road

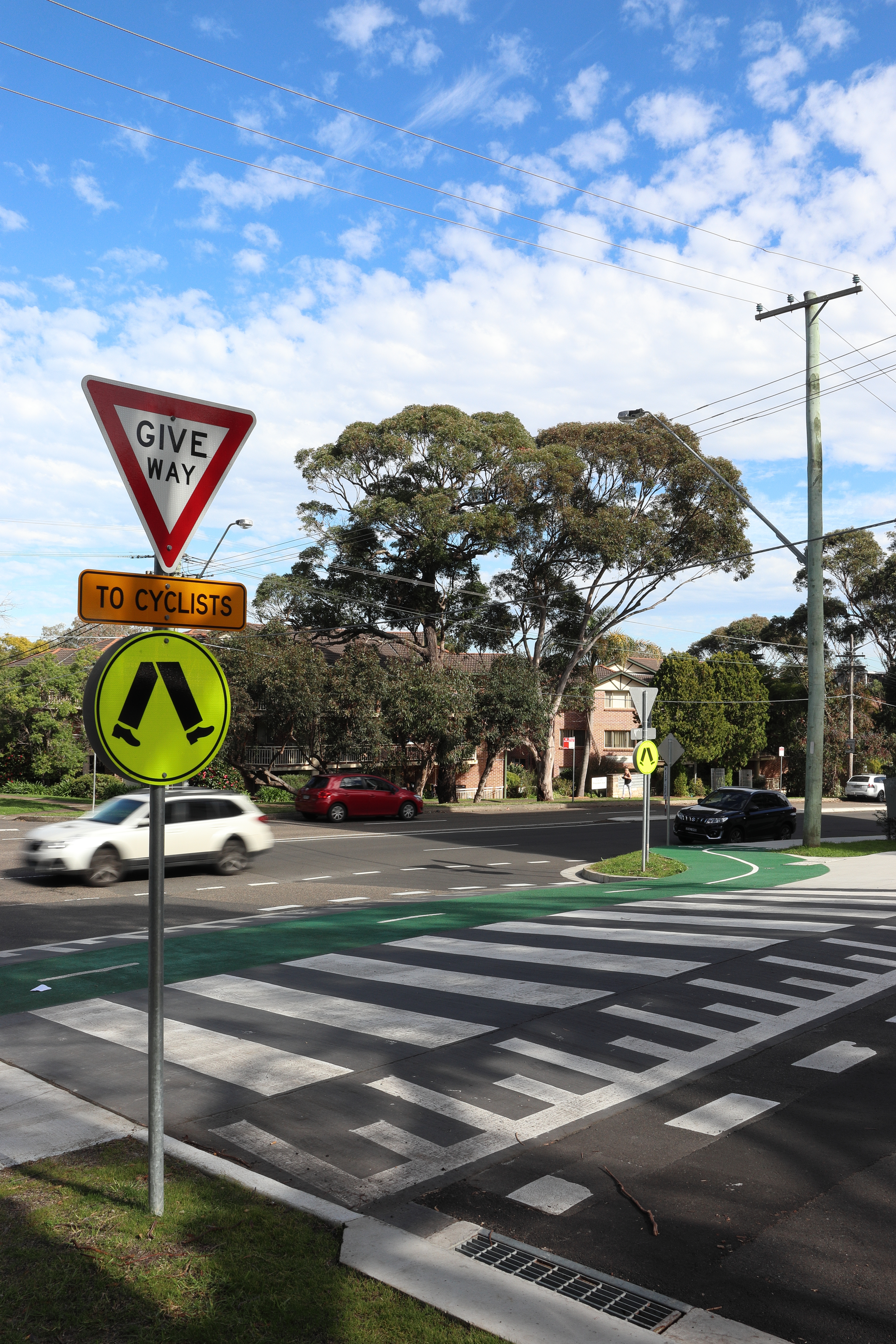
Pedestrian and cyclist crossing with associated signage in Kirrawee

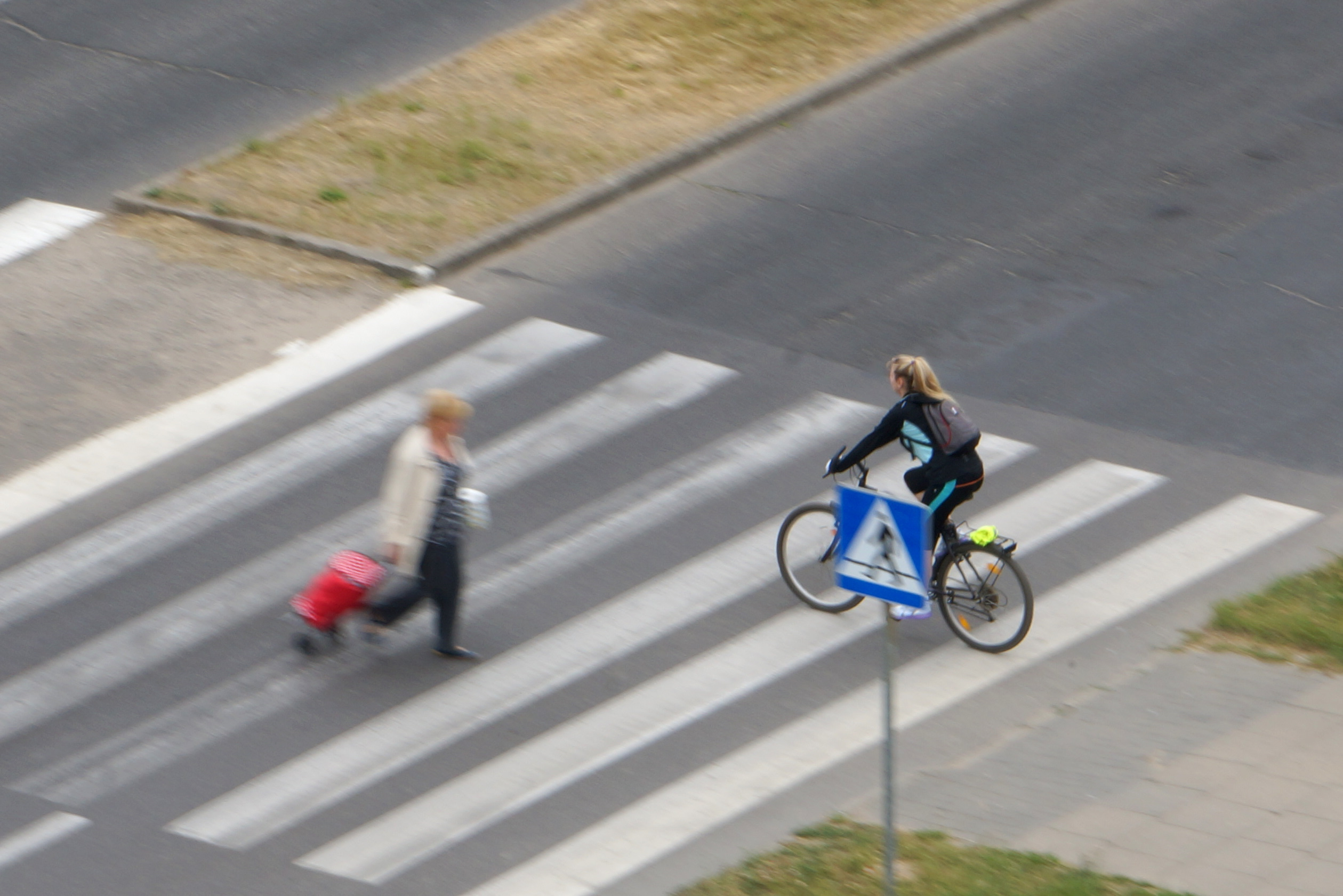
Person cycling across a pedestrian crossing

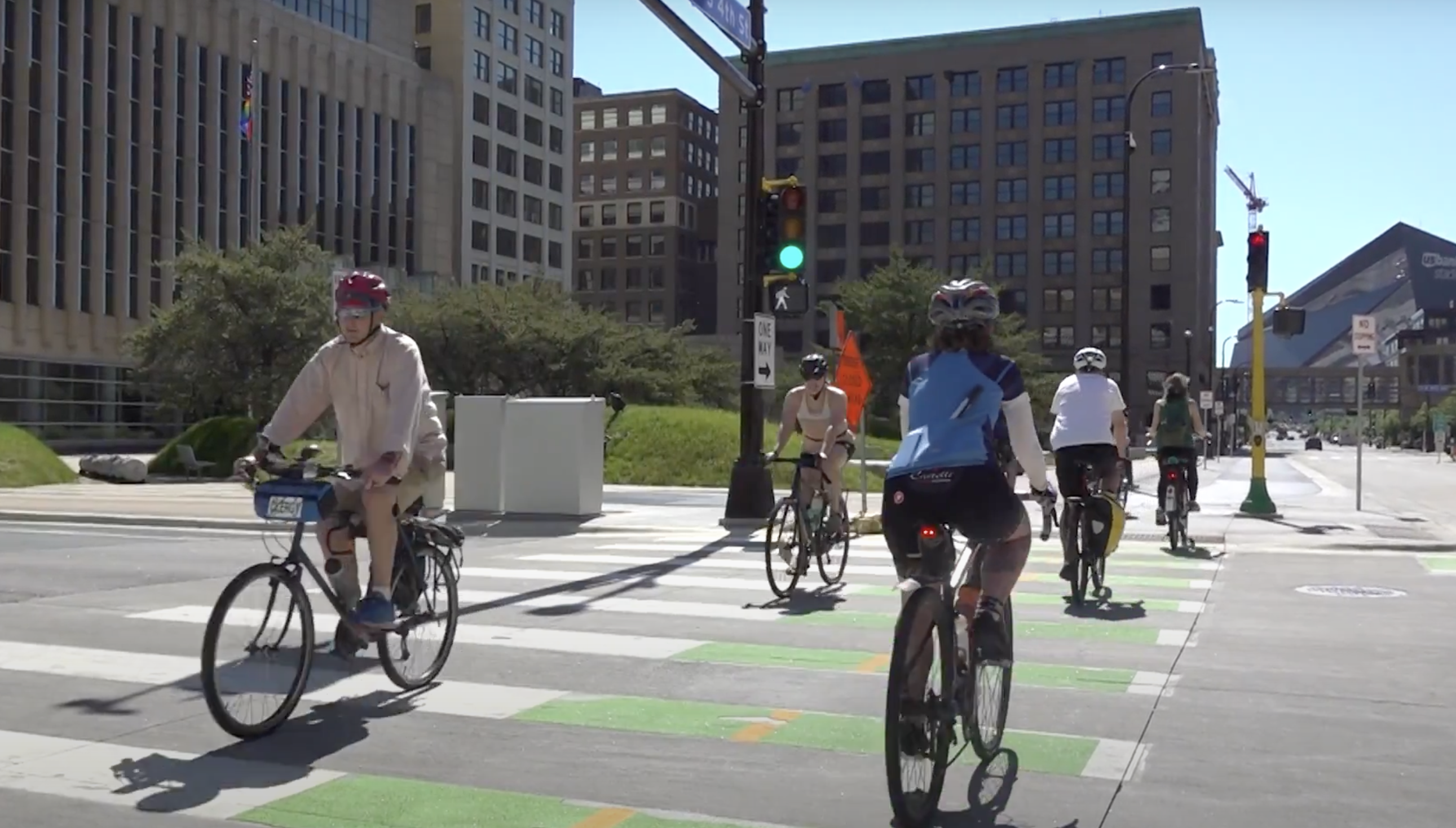
Cyclists crossing 3rd Ave S in downtown Minneapolis

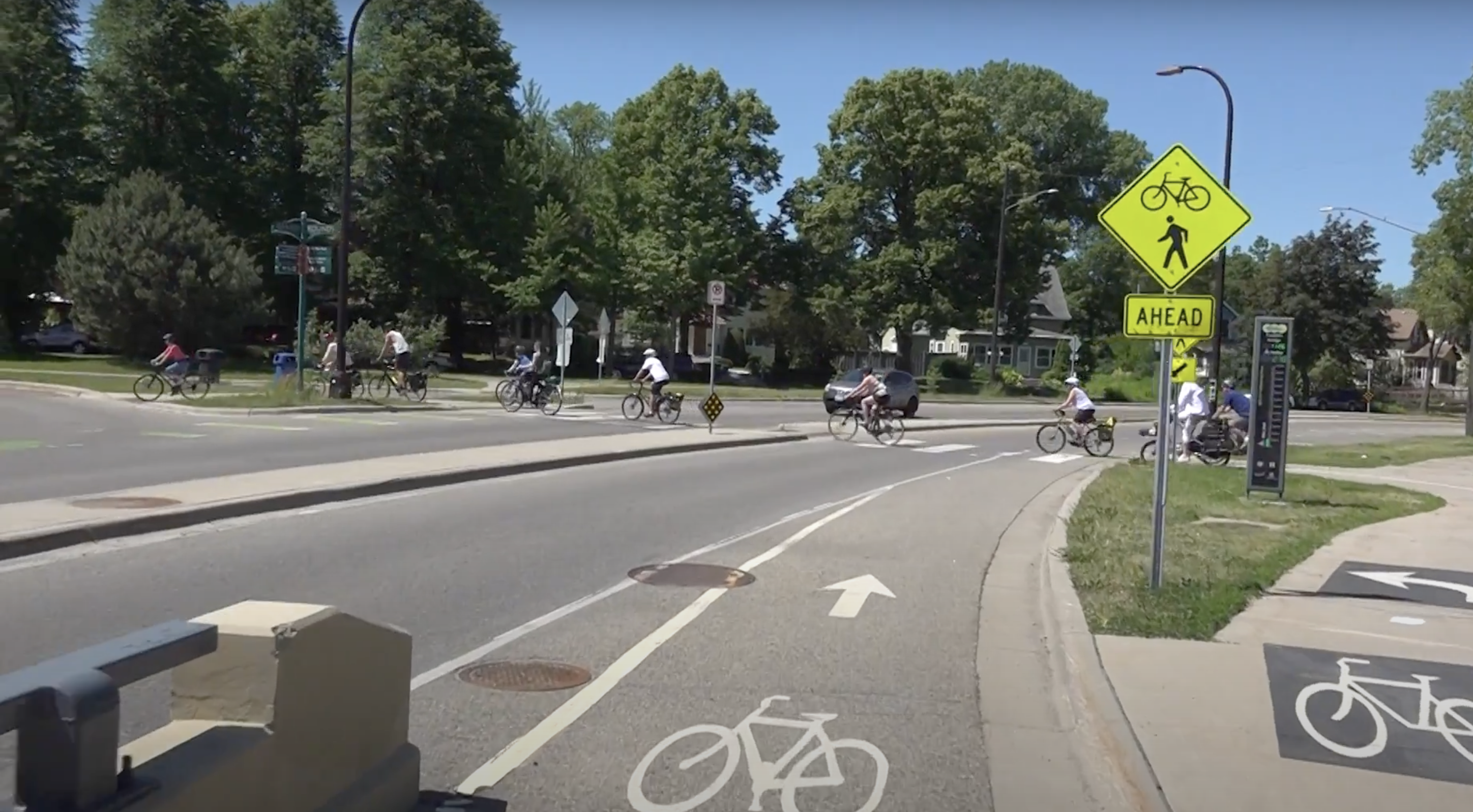
Cyclists crossing Franklin Avenue near West River Parkway

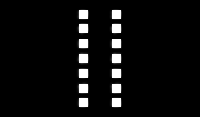
Norwegian road marking for cyclist crossing

A bicycle crossing or cyclist crossing, is a part of a road used by cyclists to cross a roadway or cycle path. It is the cyclist's version of a pedestrian crossing, where cyclists have the right of way and therefore, other traffic must give way to cyclists.

A study found that cyclist crossings with pronounced designs and an increasing rider's view into junctions (for example, by intersection daylighting), can help reduce accidents.

== Types ==
Several types of cyclist crossings exist.

=== Sweden ===
In Sweden, bicycle crossings (Swedish: cykelöverfart) were introduced in 2014, and must be designed so that motor vehicles cannot pass at a speed greater than 30 km/h. The crossing is marked with white squares in the roadway (road marking M16), while cars have yield markings and signs indicating a bicycle crossing.

A "bicycle passage" (Swedish: cykelpassage) is an older type of crossing for cyclists in Sweden. It is also marked with painted white squares in the area (road marking M16), but here cyclists generally must yield to crossing vehicles. A bicycle passage can be combined with a pedestrian crossing, in which case one row of squares can be replaced by the lines of the crossing (road marking M15, rectangular squares for pedestrians), but cyclists still have to yield for vehicles. Even though vehicles have the right of way, they must still adjust their speed for cyclists who are already in the crossing to avoid danger. The cyclist must slow down and may only cycle across if it can be done without danger.

Since both bicycle crossings and bicycle passages are very similar to each other, as well as there being large variations in their designs in Sweden, they can create uncertainty for road users about which rules apply at any given time, which can lead to misinterpretations of traffic rules and an increased risk of accidents.

== Gallery ==
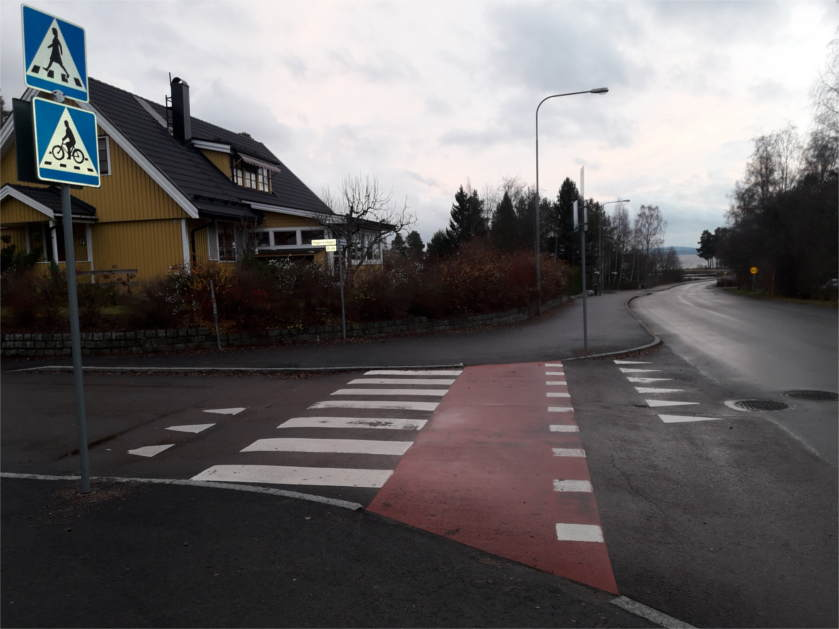
Cyclist crossing (motorists must yield)

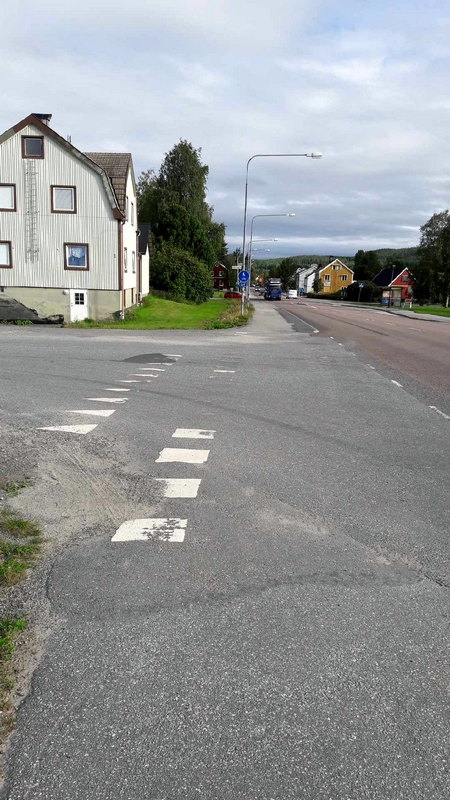
Cyclist passage (cars should give cyclists the opportunity to pass, but the cyclist also must yield)

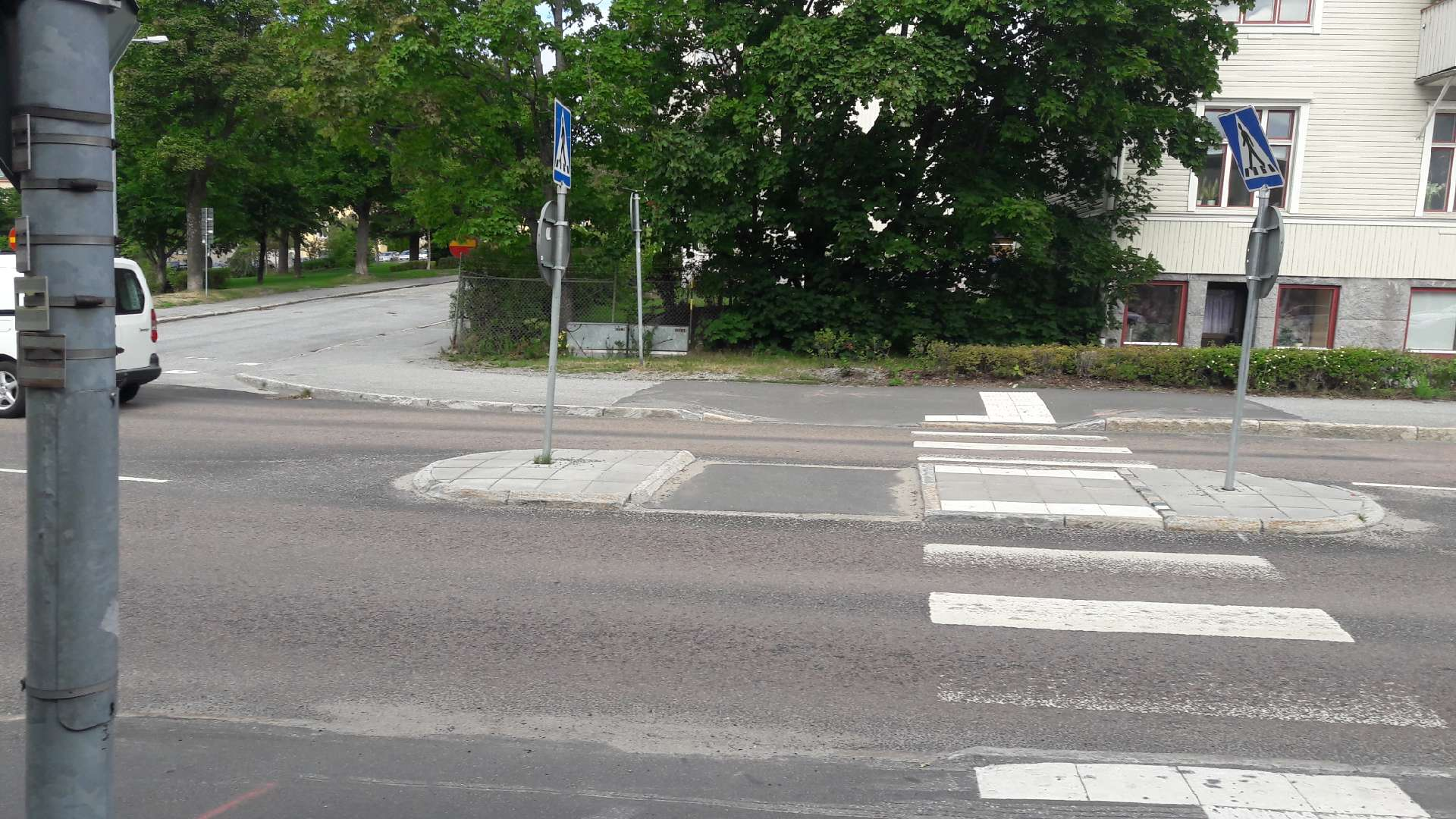
Cyclist passage (motorists must lower their speed, but cyclists should only cross if it can be done without danger)

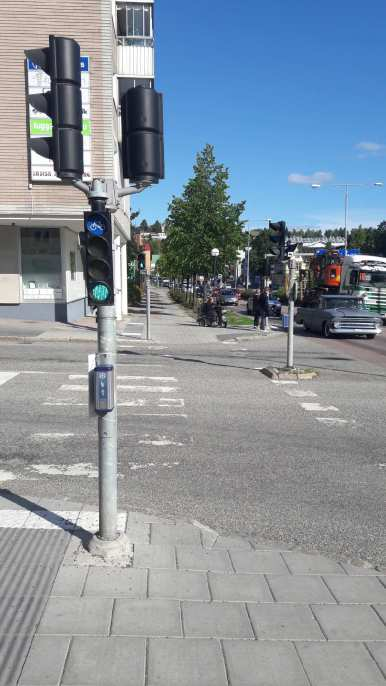
Light-controlled bicycle passage (traffic lights determine who has to yield)

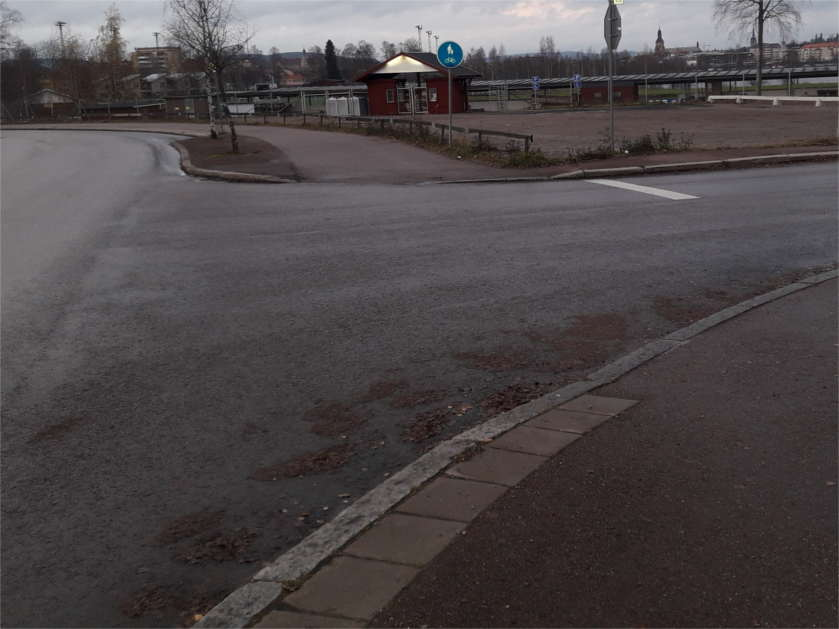
Intersection with stop sign for motorists (both cars and cyclists must yield)

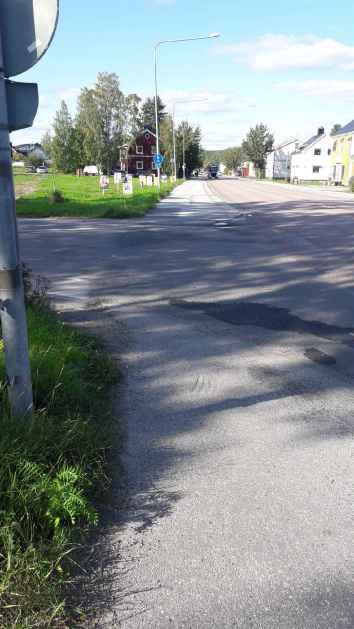
Intersection without cyclist passage or cyclist crossing (motorists crossing the bike path must yield to cyclists)

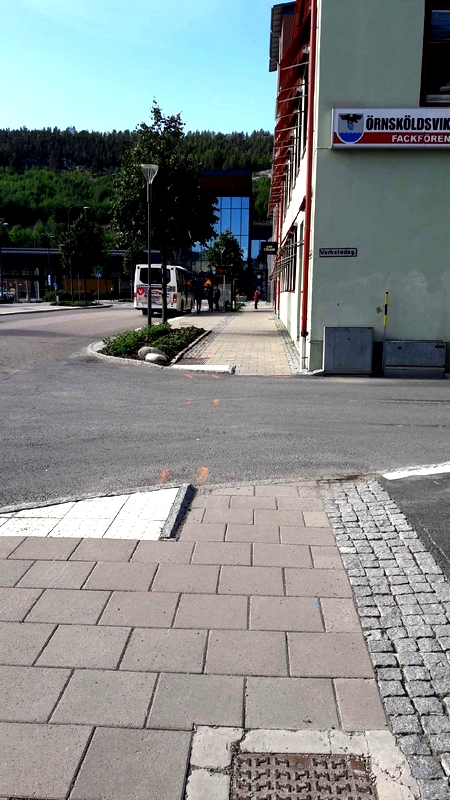
Intersection without cyclist passage or cyclist crossing (vehicles crossing the bike path after turning have to yield for cyclists)

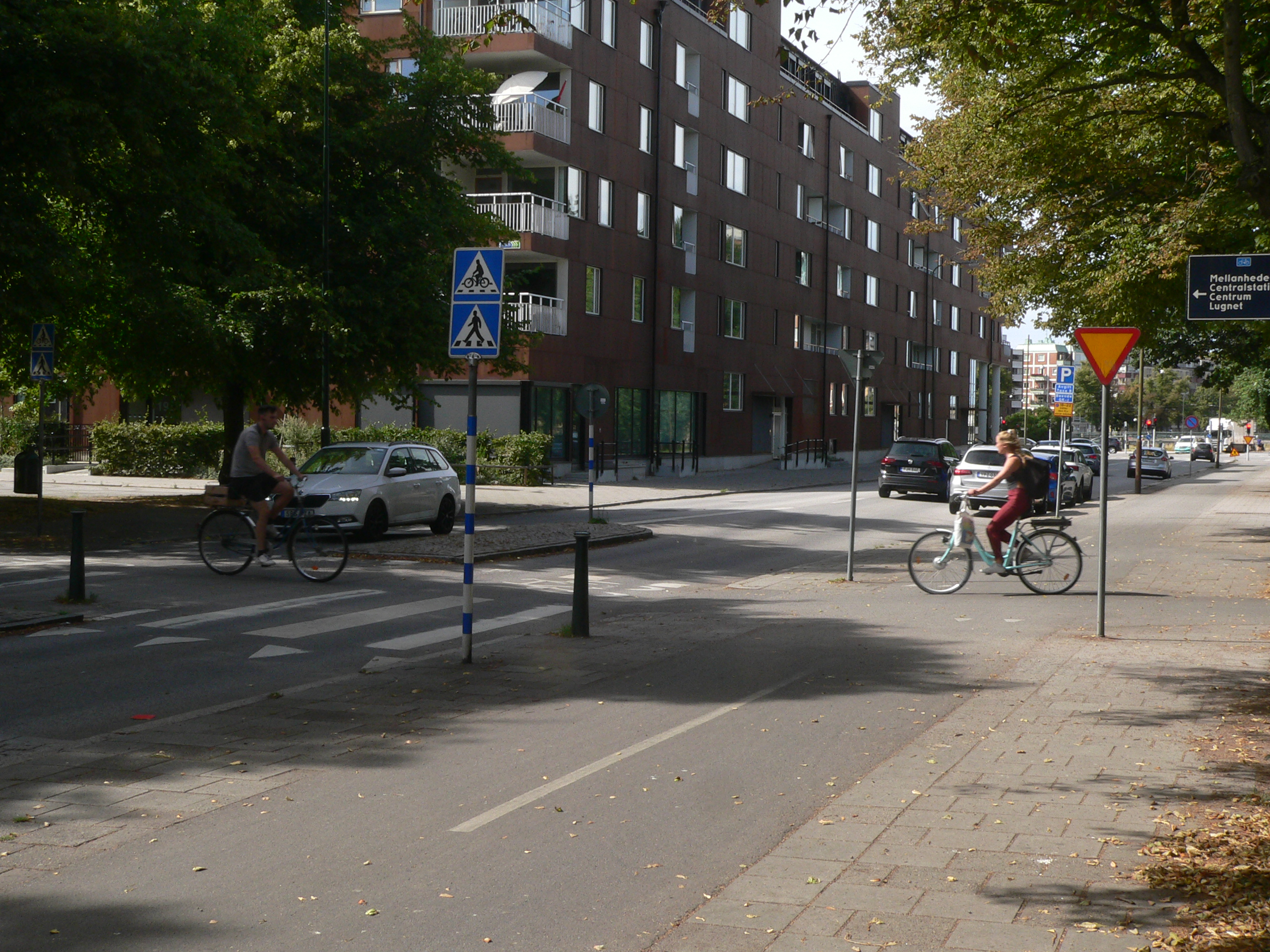
Cyclist crossing and pedestrian crossing (all other traffic must yield to the crossing footpath and cycling path)

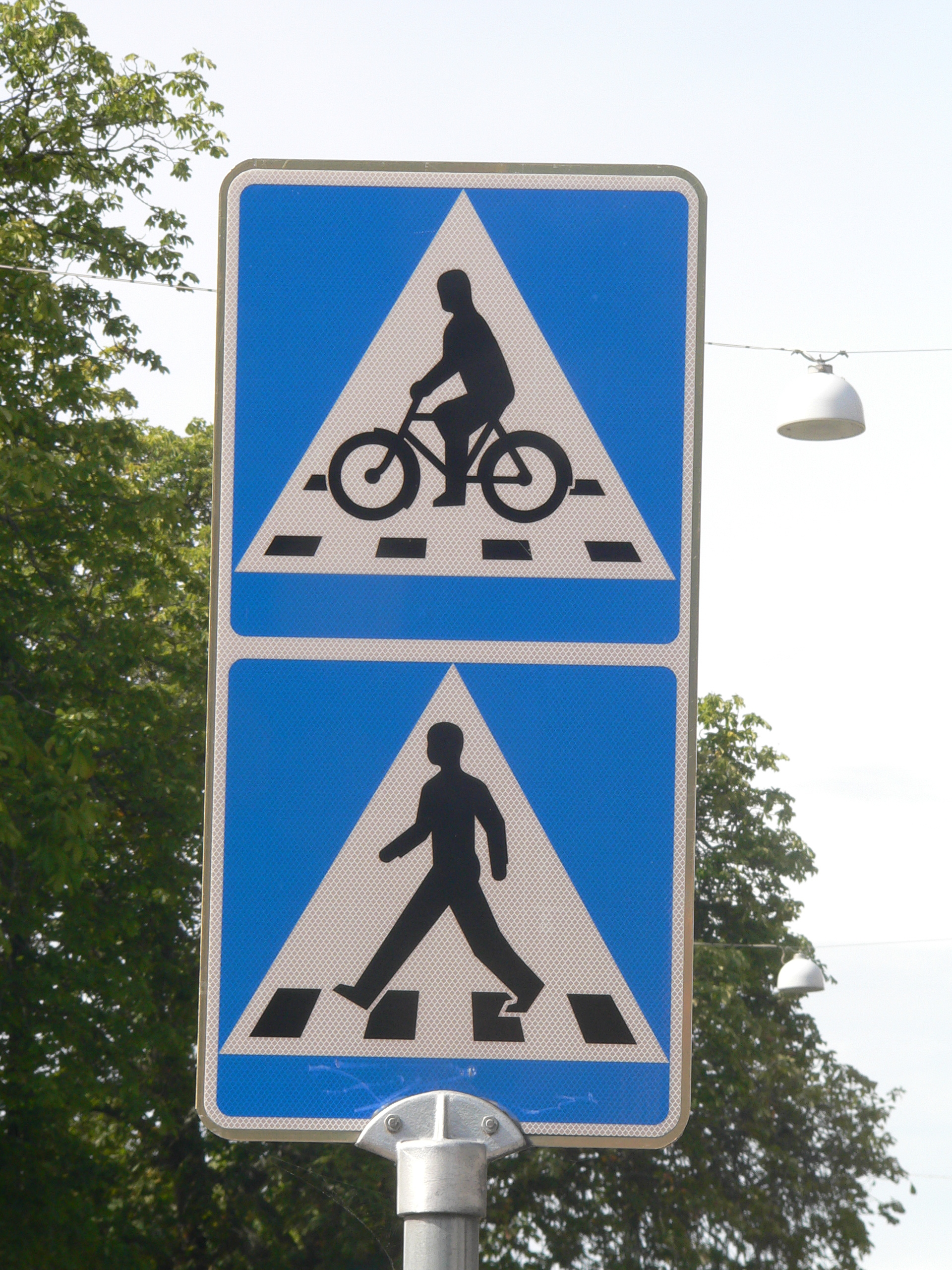
Swedish sign for cyclist crossing (top) and pedestrian crossing (bottom)

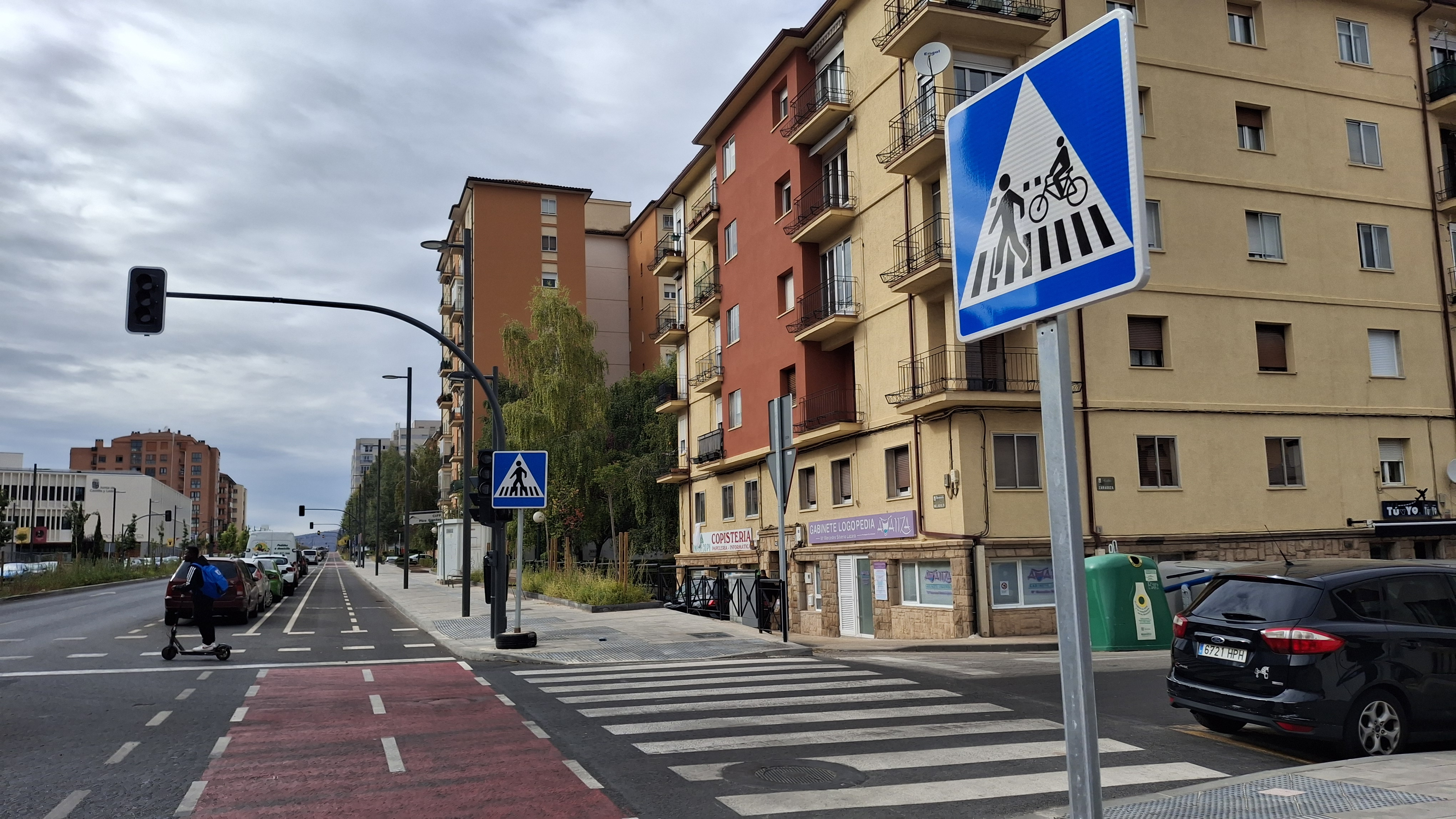
Spanish road sign for cyclists and pedestrians crossing in the same space

== See also ==
- Cyclability, how accessible a space is to cycling
- Hook turn, road-vehicular manoeuvre for turning across lanes of opposing traffic
- Protected intersection, road junction in which cyclists and pedestrians are separated from motorists
- Toucan crossing, British term for a type of pedestrian crossing that also allows bicycles to be ridden across
- Walkability, how accessible a space is to walking
