= Vehicle insurance in the United States =

Vehicle insurance in the United States (also known as car insurance or auto insurance) is designed to cover the risk of financial liability or the loss of a motor vehicle that the owner may face if their vehicle is involved in a collision that results in property or physical damage. Most states require a motor vehicle owner to carry some minimum level of liability insurance. States that do not require the vehicle owner to carry car insurance include New Hampshire and Mississippi, which offers vehicle owners the option to post cash bonds (see below). The privileges and immunities clause of Article IV of the U.S. Constitution protects the rights of citizens in each respective state when traveling to another. A motor vehicle owner typically pays insurers a monthly or yearly fee, often called an insurance premium. The insurance premium a motor vehicle owner pays is usually determined by a variety of factors including the type of covered vehicle, marital status, credit score, whether the driver rents or owns a home, the age and gender of any covered drivers, their driving history, and the location where the vehicle is primarily driven and stored. Most insurance companies will increase insurance premium rates based on these factors and offer discounts less frequently.

Insurance companies provide a motor vehicle owner with an insurance card for the particular coverage term, which is to be kept in the vehicle in case of a traffic collision as proof of insurance. Recently, states have started passing laws that allow electronic versions of proof of insurance to be accepted by the authorities.

== Coverage generally ==
Different levels of coverage may protect consumers depending on which insurance policy they purchase. Coverage is sometimes seen as 20/40/15 or 100/300/100. The first two numbers seen are for medical coverage. In the 100/300 example, the policy will pay $100,000 per person up to $300,000 total for all people. The last number covers property damage. This property damage can cover the other person's vehicle or anything that drivers hit and damage as a result of the accident. In some states, drivers must purchase Personal Injury Protection (PIP), which covers medical bills, time lost at work, and many other things. Drivers can also purchase insurance if the other driver does not have insurance or is underinsured. Most if not all states require drivers to carry mandatory liability insurance coverage to ensure that their drivers can cover the cost of damage to other people or property in the event of an accident. Some states, such as Wisconsin, have more flexible "proof of financial responsibility" requirements.

Commercial insurance for vehicles owned or operated by businesses functions quite similarly to private auto insurance, except that personal use of the vehicle is not covered. Commercial insurance pricing is also usually higher than private insurance, due to the expanded types of coverage offered for commercial users.

=== Insurance providers ===
In the United States in 2017, the largest private passenger vehicle insurance providers in terms of market share were State Farm (18.1%), GEICO (12.8%), Progressive Corporation (9.8%), Allstate (9.3%), and USAA (5.7%). Insurance is secured either by working with an independent insurance agent or with an insurance broker who is authorized to sell insurance policies. Some can represent several agencies or a growing number of online brokers who provide policy purchases through online sites.

=== Liability coverage ===
Liability coverage, sometimes known as Casualty insurance, is offered for bodily injury (BI) or property damage (PD) for which the insured driver is deemed responsible. The amount of coverage provided (a fixed dollar amount) will vary from jurisdiction to jurisdiction. Whatever the minimum, the insured can usually increase the coverage (prior to a loss) for an additional charge.

An example of property damage is where an insured driver (or 1st party) drives into a telephone pole and damages the pole; liability coverage pays for the damage to the pole. In this example, the drivers insured may also become liable for other expenses related to damaging the telephone pole, such as loss of service claims (by the telephone company), depending on the jurisdiction. An example of bodily injury is where an insured driver causes bodily harm to a third party and the insured driver is deemed responsible for the injuries. However, in some jurisdictions, the third party would first exhaust coverage for accident benefits through their own insurer (assuming they have one) and/or would have to meet a legal definition of severe impairment to have the right to claim (or sue) under the insured driver's (or first party's) policy. If the third party sues the insured driver, liability coverage also covers court costs and damages that the insured driver may be deemed responsible for.

In some states, such as New Jersey, it is illegal to operate (or knowingly allow another to operate) a motor vehicle that does not have liability insurance coverage. If an accident occurs in a state that requires liability coverage, both parties are usually required to bring and/or submit copies of insurance cards to court as proof of liability coverage.

In some jurisdictions: Liability coverage is available either as a combined single limit policy or as a split limit policy:

==== Combined single limit ====
A combined single limit combines property damage liability coverage and bodily injury coverage under one single combined limit. For example, an insured driver with a combined single liability limit strikes another vehicle and injures the driver and the passenger. Payments for the damages to the other driver's car, as well as payments for injury claims for the driver and passenger, would be paid out under this same coverage.

==== Split limits ====
A split limit liability coverage policy splits the coverages into property damage coverage and bodily injury coverage. In the example given above, payments for the other driver's vehicle would be paid out under property damage coverage, and payments for the injuries would be paid out under bodily injury coverage.

Bodily injury liability coverage is also usually split into a maximum payment per person and a maximum payment per accident.

The limits are often expressed separated by slashes in the following form: "bodily injury per person"/"bodily injury per accident"/"property damage". For example, California requires this minimum coverage:

- $15,000 for injury/death to one person
- $30,000 for injury/death to more than one person
- $5,000 for damage to property

This would be expressed as "$15,000/$30,000/$5,000".

Another example, in the state of Oklahoma, drivers must carry at least state minimum liability limits of $25,000/$50,000/$25,000. If an insured driver hits a car full of people and is found by the insurance company to be liable, the insurance company will pay $25,000 of one person's medical bills but will not exceed $50,000 for other people injured in the accident. The insurance company will not pay more than $25,000 for property damage in repairs to the vehicle that the insured one hit.

In the state of Indiana, the minimum liability limits are $25,000/$50,000/$10,000, so there is a greater property damage exposure for only carrying the minimum limits.

==== Rental coverage ====
Generally, liability coverage purchased through a private insurer extends to rental cars. Comprehensive policies ("full coverage") usually also apply to the rental vehicle, although this should be verified beforehand. Full coverage premiums are based on, among other factors, the value of the insured's vehicle. This coverage, however, cannot apply to rental cars because the insurance company does not want to assume responsibility for a claim greater than the value of the insured's vehicle, assuming that a rental car may be worth more than the insured's vehicle.

Most rental car companies offer insurance to cover damage to the rental vehicle. These policies may be unnecessary for many customers as credit card companies, such as Visa and MasterCard, now provide supplemental collision damage coverage to rental cars if the rental transaction is processed using one of their cards. These benefits are restrictive in terms of the types of vehicles covered.

Maine requires car insurance to rent a car.

=== Full coverage ===
Full coverage is the term commonly used to refer to the combination of comprehensive and collision coverages (liability is generally also implied.) The term full coverage is actually a misnomer because, even within traditional "full coverage" insurance, there are many different types of coverage, and many optional amounts of each. "Full coverage" is a layman's misnomer that often results in drivers and vehicle owners being woefully underinsured. Most responsible insurance agents or brokers do not use this term when working with their clients.

Most financial lenders in the United States require the financed vehicle to have collision coverage, and not just liability coverage, in order for the financial institution to cover their losses in case of an accident. Insurance requirements vary between financial institutions and each state. Minimum deductibles and liability limits (required by some leasing companies) would be outlined in the loan contract. Failure to carry the required coverages may lead to the lienholder purchasing insurance and adding the cost to the monthly payments or repossession of the vehicle. Vehicles purchased with cash or paid off by the owner are generally required to only carry liability. In some cases, vehicles financed through a "buy-here-pay-here" car dealership—in which the consumer (generally those with poor credit) finances a car and pays the dealer directly without a bank—may require comprehensive and collision depending on the amount owed for the vehicle.

==== Collision ====
Collision coverage provides coverage for vehicles involved in collisions. Collision coverage is subject to a deductible. This coverage is designed to provide payments to repair the damaged vehicle, or payment of the cash value of the vehicle if it is not repairable or totaled. Collision coverage is optional, however if someone plans on financing a car or taking a car loan, the lender will usually insist the borrower carry collision for the finance term or until the car is paid off. Collision Damage Waiver (CDW) or Loss Damage Waiver (LDW) is the term used by rental car companies for collision coverage.

Impact with a pedestrian has been ruled in prior court cases as a collision with an object and is considered a collision claim.

==== Comprehensive ====
Comprehensive coverage, also known as other-than-collision coverage, is subject to a deductible and covers cars damaged by incidents that are not considered collisions. For example, fire, theft (or attempted theft), vandalism, damage from weather such as wind or hail, or impacts with non-human animals are types of comprehensive losses.

Additionally, a few insurance companies list "Acts of God" as an aspect of comprehensive coverage, although this is an old term that is not ordinarily used today. By definition, it includes any events or occurrences that are beyond human control. For example, a tornado, flood, hurricane, or hail storm would fall under this category.

While etymologically all living creatures are considered animals, impact with a human is excluded from the definition of "animal" under insurance definitions. In McKay v. State Farm Mutual Automobile Insurance Co., 933 F. Supp 635, (S.D.Tex., 1995), the insured's claim was denied for the incident in which an intoxicated pedestrian ran into the side of their vehicle on the freeway. Legally, animals are defined as "“all animal life other than humans and signifies an inferior or irrational sentient being, generally, though not necessarily, possessed of the power of self-motion.”

==== Uninsured/underinsured motorist coverage ====
Uninsured/Underinsured coverage, also known as UM/UIM, provides coverage if an at-fault party either does not have insurance, or does not have enough insurance. In effect, the insurance company pays the insured medical bills, then would subrogate from the at fault party. This coverage is often overlooked and very important. In Colorado, for example, it was estimated in 2009 that 15% of drivers were uninsured. Usually the limits match the liability limits. Some insurance companies do offer UM/UIM in an umbrella policy.

Some states maintain unsatisfied judgment funds to provide compensation to those who cannot collect damages from uninsured driver. Typically, the payout is not more than the minimum liability limits and the negligent driver remains responsible for reimbursing the state's fund.

In the United States, the definition of an uninsured/underinsured motorist, and corresponding coverages, are set by state laws. In some states it is mandatory. In the case of underinsured coverage, two different triggers apply: a damages trigger which is based on whether the limits are insufficient to cover the injured party's damages, and a limits trigger which applies when the limits are less than the injured party's limits. According to a 2009 survey by trade association Property Casualty Insurers Association of America, 29 states have a limits trigger while 20 states have a damages trigger. Another variation is whether a particular state requires stacking of policy limits of different vehicles or policies.

==== Loss of use ====
Loss of use coverage, also known as rental coverage, provides reimbursement for rental expenses associated with having an insured vehicle repaired due to a covered loss.

==== Loan/lease payoff ====
Loan/lease payoff coverage, also known as GAP coverage or GAP insurance, was established in the early 1980s to provide protection to consumers based upon buying and market trends.

Due to the sharp decline in value immediately following purchase, there is generally a period in which the amount owed on the car loan exceeds the value of the vehicle, which is called "upside-down" or negative equity. Thus, if the vehicle is damaged beyond economical repair at this point, the owner will still owe potentially thousands of dollars on the loan. The escalating price of cars, longer-term auto loans, and the increasing popularity of leasing gave birth to GAP protection. GAP waivers provide protection for consumers when a "gap" exists between the actual value of their vehicle and the amount of money owed to the bank or leasing company. In many instances, this insurance will also pay the deductible on the primary insurance policy. These policies are often offered at auto dealerships as a comparatively low cost add-on to the car loan that provides coverage for the duration of the loan. GAP Insurance does not always pay off the full loan value however. These cases include but are not limited to:

1. Any unpaid delinquent payments due at the time of loss
2. Payment deferrals or extensions (commonly called skips or skip a payment)
3. Refinancing of the vehicle loan after the policy was purchased
4. Late fees or other administrative fees assessed after loan commencement

Therefore, it is important for a policy holder to understand that they may still owe on the loan even though the GAP policy was purchased. Failure to understand this can result in the lender continuing their legal remedies to collect the balance and the potential of damaged credit.

Consumers should be aware that a few states, including New York, require lenders of leased cars to include GAP insurance within the cost of the lease itself. This means that the monthly price quoted by the dealer must include GAP insurance, whether it is delineated or not. Nevertheless, unscrupulous dealers sometimes prey on unsuspecting individuals by offering them GAP insurance at an additional price, on top of the monthly payment, without mentioning the State's requirements.

In addition, some vendors and insurance companies offer what is called "Total Loss Coverage." This is similar to ordinary GAP insurance but differs in that instead of paying off the negative equity on a vehicle that is a total loss, the policy provides a certain amount, usually up to $5000, toward the purchase or lease of a new vehicle. Thus, to some extent the distinction makes no difference, i.e., in either case the owner receives a certain sum of money. However, in choosing which type of policy to purchase, the owner should consider whether, in case of a total loss, it is more advantageous for him or her to have the policy pay off the negative equity or provide a down payment on a new vehicle.

For example, assuming a total loss of a vehicle valued at $15,000, but on which the owner owes $20,000, is the "gap" of $5000. If the owner has traditional GAP coverage, the "gap" will be wiped out and he or she may purchase or lease another vehicle or choose not to. If the owner has "Total Loss Coverage," he or she will have to personally cover the "gap" of $5000, and then receive $5000 toward the purchase or lease of a new vehicle, thereby either reducing monthly payments, in the case of financing or leasing, or the total purchase price in the case of outright purchasing. So the decision on which type of policy to purchase will, in most instances, be informed by whether the owner can pay off the negative equity in case of a total loss and/or whether he or she will definitively purchase a replacement vehicle.

==== Towing ====
Vehicle towing coverage is also known as roadside assistance coverage. Traditionally, automobile insurance companies have agreed to only pay for the cost of a tow that is related to an accident that is covered under the automobile policy of insurance. This had left a gap in coverage for tows that are related to mechanical breakdowns, flat tires and gas outages. To fill that void, insurance companies started to offer the car towing coverage, which pays for non-accident related tows.

==== Personal property ====
Personal items in a vehicle that are damaged due to an accident typically are not covered under the auto insurance policy. Any type of property that is not attached to the vehicle should be claimed under a home insurance or renters' insurance policy. However, some insurance companies will cover unattached GPS devices intended for automobile use.

=== Rating plans ===
Insurers use actuarial science to determine the rates, which involves statistical analysis of the various characteristics of drivers.

== Cost ==
The automobile insurance market in the United States is a 308 billion US dollar market.

Every state has a different minimum coverage requirement, making auto insurance coverage more expensive in some states than others, but they remain lower than the minimum amounts of insurance coverage of most EEA countries involved in the Green card system.

In the USA, the yearly average cost of insurance is between $983 in New Hampshire and $2,551 in Michigan.

Additional coverage come with additional cost of about $1,000 per year.

== Public policy considerations ==
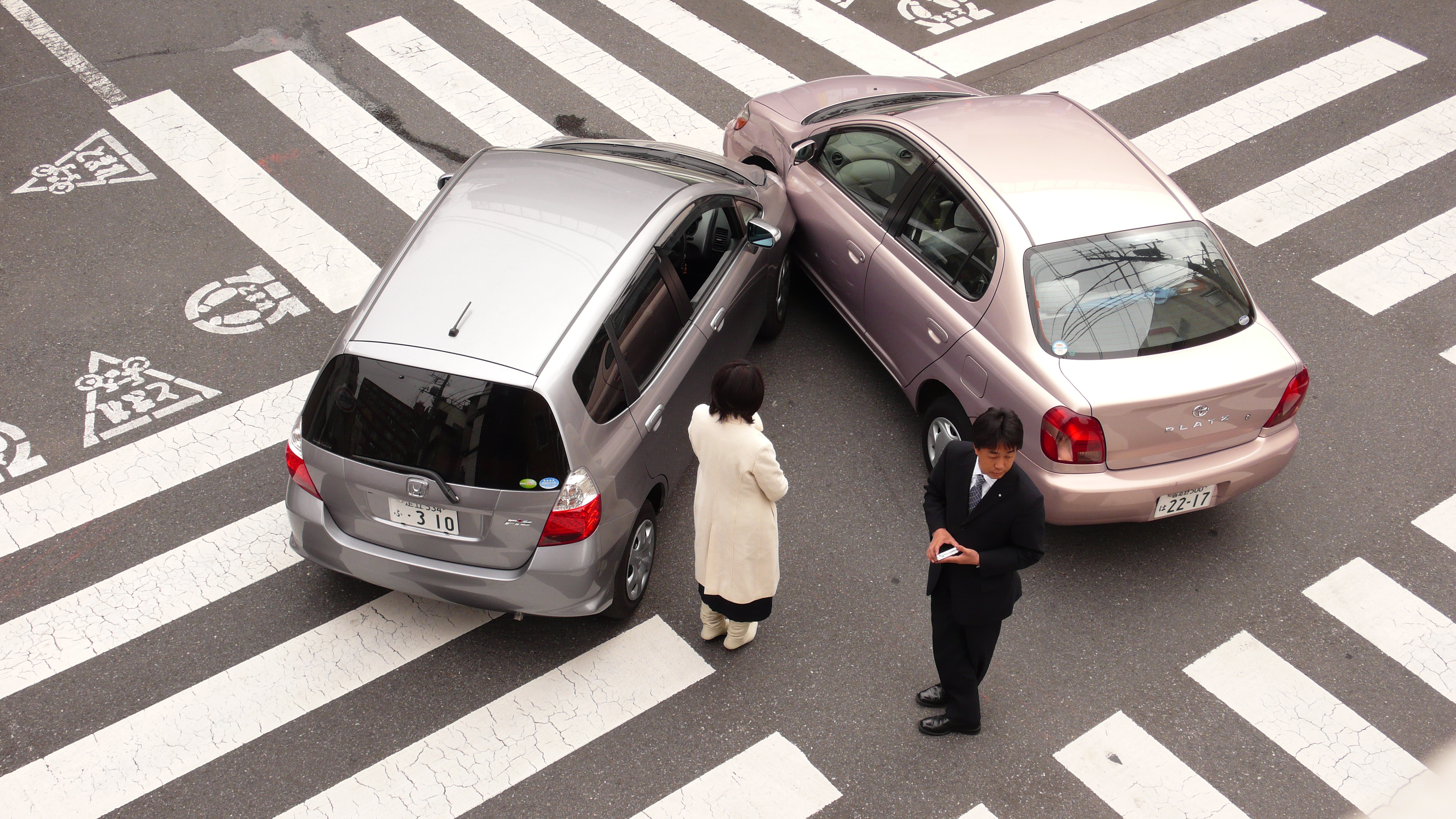
Crash

In the United States, automotive insurance covering liability for injuries and property damage is compulsory in most states, but different states enforce the insurance requirement differently. Penalties for not purchasing insurance vary by state, but often include a substantial fine, license and/or registration suspension or revocation, and possible jail time. Usually, the minimum required by law is third party insurance to protect third parties against the financial consequences of loss, damage or injury caused by a vehicle.

California and New Jersey have enacted "Personal Responsibility Acts" which put further pressure on all drivers to carry liability insurance by preventing uninsured drivers from recovering non economic damages (e.g. compensation for "pain and suffering") if they are injured in any way while operating a motor vehicle.

North Carolina is the only state to require that a driver hold liability insurance before a license can be issued. North Carolina does allow for a "fleet license" to be issued if the license holder has no insurance, however the fleet license only allows for the driver to operate vehicles owned and insured by their employer. The license holder must produce a state form (DL-123) to prove they have insurance, requiring the signature of an insurance agent, in addition to a ten dollar fee, in order to convert the fleet license to a full license.

Some states require that proof of insurance be carried in the car at all times, while others do not. For example, North Carolina does not specify that proof of insurance must be carried in the vehicle; it does, however, require that a driver have that information to trade with another driver in the event of an accident. Some states allow for an electronic insurance card to be produced on a smartphone.

Arizona Department of Transportation Research Project Manager John Semmens has recommended that car insurers issue license plates and be held responsible for the full cost of injuries and property damage caused by their licensees under the Disneyland model. Plates would expire at the end of the insurance coverage period, and licensees would need to return their plates to their insurance office to receive a refund on their premiums. Vehicles driving without insurance would thus be easy to spot because they would not have license plates, or the plates would be past the marked expiration date.

=== The compulsory insurance debate ===
==== A brief history of car insurance ====
With the invention of the automobile in the late 19th century came the inevitable side effect of automobile collisions. As automotive collisions increased in frequency, it became clear that, unlike other torts, which relied on personal responsibility, there was a possibility that automobiles would need to be governed by laws because "[t]here was no way of assuring that even though fault was assessed the victim of an automobile collision would be able to collect from the tortfeasor."

This led Massachusetts and Connecticut to create the first financial responsibility and compulsory insurance laws. Connecticut's 1925 financial responsibility law required any vehicle owner involved in a collision with damages over $100 to prove "financial responsibility to satisfy any claim for damages, by reason of personal injury, to, or death of, any person, of at least $10,000." This early financial responsibility requirement only required vehicle owners to prove financial responsibility after their first collision. Massachusetts also introduced a law to address the problem of collisions, but theirs was a compulsory insurance, not financial responsibility law. It required automotive liability insurance as a prerequisite to vehicle registration.

Until 1956, when the New York legislature passed their compulsory insurance law, Massachusetts was the only state in the U.S. that required drivers to get insurance before registration. North Carolina followed suit in 1957 and then in the 1960s and 1970s numerous other states passed similar compulsory insurance laws. Since the genesis of automotive insurance schemes in 1925 nearly every state has adopted a compulsory insurance scheme.

=== Requirements by state ===
The tables below contain minimum liability requirements for vehicle owners within the United States. They are divided into two categories: compulsory and non compulsory. See the table on the right for an explanation of the values.

Understanding the tables: XX/XX/XX = Bodily Injury Limit (per individual)/Bodily Injury Limit (per accident)/Property Damage Limit For example, limits of 25/50/20 means after "an accident each person injured would receive a maximum of up to 25,000 with only 50,000 allowed per accident (ex. 2 people needing 25,000, if the need is more such as 3 people needing 25,000 then whoever files first gets first access to the 50,000 limit, and the driver at fault for the accident may be sued for the rest). The last number refers to the total coverage per accident for property damage which in this case would be 20,000."

| State | Minimum insurance requirements | Non compulsory insurance state |
|---|---|---|
| Alabama | 25/50/25 | |
| Alaska | 50/100/25 | |
| Arizona | 25/50/15 | |
| Arkansas | 25/50/15 | |
| California | 30/60/15 | |
| Colorado | 25/50/15 | |
| Connecticut | 25/50/25 | |
| District of Columbia | 10/25/5 | |
| Delaware | 15/30/5 | |
| Florida | 0/0/10 | FL requires at least $10,000 in PIP Coverage. Taxis: 125/250/50 |
| Georgia | 25/50/25 | |
| Hawaii | 20/40/10 | |
| Idaho | 25/50/15 | |
| Illinois | 20/40/15 | |
| Indiana | 25/50/25 | |
| Iowa | 20/40/15 | |
| Kansas | 25/50/10 | |
| Kentucky | 25/50/25 | |
| Louisiana | 15/30/25 | |
| Maine | 50/100/25 | |
| Maryland | 30/60/15 | |
| Massachusetts | 20/40/5 | In lieu of auto insurance, individuals can either (1) deposit $10,000 in cash, stocks, or bonds with the State Treasurer who will issue a receipt or (2) obtain a motor vehicle liability bond equal to the state minimum limits. |
| Michigan | 20/40/10 | |
| Minnesota | 30/60/10 | |
| Mississippi | 25/50/25 | |
| Missouri | 25/50/10 | |
| Montana | 25/50/10 | |
| Nebraska | 25/50/25 | |
| Nevada | 25/50/20 | |
| New Hampshire | N/A (Personal Responsibility Only) | Yes, however individuals would be held responsible by law to pay for any bodily injuries or property damage in the event of an accident. |
| New Jersey | 0/0/5 | NJ requires at least $15,000 in PIP Coverage |
| New Mexico | 25/50/10 | |
| New York | 25/50/10 | |
| North Carolina | 30/60/25 | |
| North Dakota | 25/50/25 | |
| Ohio | 20/50/25 | |
| Oklahoma | 25/50/25 | |
| Oregon | 25/50/20 | |
| Pennsylvania | 15/30/5 | |
| Rhode Island | 25/50/25 | |
| South Carolina | 25/50/25 | |
| South Dakota | 25/50/25 | |
| Tennessee | 25/50/15 | |
| Texas | 30/60/25 | Yes, however financial responsibility should then be established through a surety bond or a deposit of $55,000 with the comptroller or the county judge. |
| Utah | 25/65/15 | |
| Vermont | 25/50/10 | |
| Virginia | 30/60/20 | Since July 1, 2024, drivers are now required to have insurance. Initially, they had the option of paying $500 every year for driving uninsured. This is to rise to 50/100/25 from January 2025 |
| Washington | 25/50/10 | |
| West Virginia | 20/40/10 | |
| Wisconsin | 25/50/10 | |
| Wyoming | 25/50/20 | |

== High-risk market ==
Insurers may be unwilling to insure drivers (especially at an affordable price) with particularly bad histories, which had led states to create "residual market" programs through which insurers are required to make insurance available. There are various ways that this is accomplished, with the most common being an assigned risk plan and other programs including joint underwriting associations, reinsurance facilities, and in the case of Maryland a state-owned fund subsidized by insurers. However, the Consumer Federation of America found that drivers who have high-risk auto insurance, even if they have safe driving records, may be quoted higher-than-average rates by insurers when they seek new coverage.

== See also ==
- SR-22 (insurance)
