= Full tort and limited tort automobile insurance =

Full tort and limited tort automobile insurance options were instituted by the state of Pennsylvania in an attempt to decrease the number of pain and suffering lawsuits in Pennsylvania courts. Concerned about the high rates of automobile insurance, Pennsylvania enacted mandatory personal injury protection (PIP) insurance coverage in the attempt to reduce the number of lawsuits resulting from automobile accidents. PIP insurance covers the medical bills of drivers involved in an accident, regardless of who is at fault. The idea behind the creation of PIP insurance was that it would reduce the number of ‘pain and suffering’ or ‘loss’ lawsuits, thereby reducing insurance company payouts and ultimately reducing insurance premiums.

Individuals who now purchase insurance in Pennsylvania are classified as either “limited tort” or “full tort.” Tort is a legal term meaning “civil wrongdoing – in civil law, a wrongful act for which damages can be sought by the injured party.”

In Pennsylvania, insurance companies offer full tort coverage which gives covered individuals the ability to sue in court for all damages, and limited tort coverage which “limits” the ability to sue for pain and suffering. Both full tort and limited tort coverage only apply in situations where the driver or passengers have been injured in an accident that is not the driver's fault. The victim then has the option of bringing charges against the at-fault driver to sue in court for unpaid medical bills, property damage, loss of income, pain, and suffering.

Limited tort coverage is less expensive, so it is appealing to consumers as a way to save on their insurance premiums. This option will save approximately 15% in premiums annually. However, by choosing limited tort, consumers give up the ability to sue for “pain and suffering” unless the injuries suffered are considered a "serious injury" as that term is defined in the standard automobile insurance policy in Pennsylvania. Unfortunately, consumers likely will not read these lengthy policies before electing "limited tort" or "full tort" and consequently, they could be misled by the terms in the election. In particular, "serious injury" is defined as "death, significant deformity or impairment of body function." As a result, most consumers who elect "limited tort" believing it is reasonable to only make a claim for "pain and suffering" if their injury is serious, do not realize that most insurance companies do not consider even permanent injuries to be "serious injuries" if the consumer is not dead, disfigured or crippled. For example, insurance carriers will deny claim for "pain and suffering" where the injured victim has suffered a herniated disc or even broken bones.
