= Pengci =

Type of fraud

Pèngcí (Chinese: 碰瓷; lit. 'touching or bumping porcelain') is a modus operandi of fraud and extortion commonly seen in China, usually done by placing ostensibly expensive, fragile items (usually porcelain) in places where they may easily be knocked over, allowing them to collect damages when the items are damaged; moreover, the value of the damaged goods can be exaggerated by the scammer (such as falsely claiming the object as antique porcelain ware) in order to claim extra reparations. The term has been expanded to include a predominantly Chinese crime where scammers feign injury in traffic accidents in order to extort money from drivers, as well to describe "broken porcelain" diplomacy, in which any foreign criticism of the Chinese government, or its strategic issues, is met with manufactured outrage, shattering the "porcelain of diplomacy" and fanning popular anger.

The melon drop scam in the western world is similar to Pengci which originally targeted Japanese tourists due to the high price of watermelon in Japan. The scammer will bump or cause the mark to bump into them causing the scammer to drop a watermelon. The scammer may then receive upwards of $100 for "compensation".

== Origin ==
There are different theories about the origin of "pengci", two of which are most recognized by the public.

=== Terminology in the antique market ===
When placing antiques on the booth, some sellers deliberately placed fragile porcelain, counterfeit or damaged defective products in the middle or corner of the road, waiting for passers-by to accidentally damage them, and they can take the opportunity to extort money under false pretenses.

=== Declining nobles in late Qing Dynasty ===
During the 200 years of Qing government rule, nobles (Eight Banners) enjoyed certain privileges. However, in the late Qing Dynasty, the national power weakened, and the money and food supplied to the nobles became less and less, and eventually disappeared. The nobles sold real estate and antiques in order to survive. In order to get more money, some of them walked in crowded places with a piece of defective porcelain in hand. They deliberately let the carriage or passers-by touch the porcelain and damage it, and threatened pedestrians or the carriage driver to force them to pay compensation. In the beginning of the Republic of China, this behavior often occurred in downtown areas, but the tools of crime were replaced with pens, glasses, music boxes and other small items.

== See also ==
- List of confidence tricks
- Staged crashes and collisions as forms of insurance fraud
