= Autocide =

Autocide may refer to:

- Sterile insect technique, a method of biological insect control
- Vehicular suicide, the use of a motor vehicle to intentionally cause one's own death
