= Assigned risk =

Insurance method

Assigned risk is a government-required method of providing insurance coverage to an individual by compelling insurance companies to service them when such companies would ordinarily not do so due to perceived risk of insuring the individual as a customer.

== United States ==
Within the United States, several state governments have laws compelling insurers to provide automobile insurance and workers' compensation policies to individuals listed in assigned risk pools.

== Motor vehicle insurance ==
In the United States, a state government, usually the Department of Motor Vehicles, assigns the risky motorists to automobile insurance companies.

High risk drivers are often undesirable to insurance companies, and may not be able to purchase insurance through conventional means. They are considered high-risk because of numerous speeding or other traffic tickets, or a recent history of motor vehicle accidents, or in states that have a point system, accumulation of so many points. The state DMV point system may be different from the insurance companies' point system.

Several states in the U.S. have such assigned risk systems. New York is a typical system. The MVAIC, or Motor Vehicle Accident Indemnity Company, may assign high-risk drivers, and pays for victims of uninsured or underinsured motorists. Uninsured means the driver or owner of a motor vehicle has no insurance at all, while an underinsured person has insurance, but the coverage is insignificant compared to the potential damages accrued from a tort lawsuit.

== See also ==
- Insurance
- Insurance companies
- Motor vehicle
- Surety
- Underinsured
