= Powell v Moody =

UK legal case about road traffic collisions

Powell v Moody (1966) 110 Sol Jo 215 is English case law, often used for the settlement of civil claims brought as the result of road traffic collisions. The case was decided in 1966.

A recent case Davis v Schrogin is lately quoted as a defence to Powell v Moody. However, Davis v Schrogin does not supersede Powell v Moody and that the latter is still considered in out-of-court settlements. This is because in the case of Davis v Schogin, the car driver emerged from a line of traffic to make a U-turn and not from a side road.

== Case ==
The plaintiff was riding a motorbike along a road and came across a stationary line of traffic consisting of vehicles two abreast. The plaintiff proceeded along the offside overtaking the stationary vehicles. The defendant came out of a side road in a car through a gap in the traffic intending to turn right in the opposite direction to the traffic and the plaintiff's travel. The defendant was signalled by the driver of a milk-tanker to proceed and as the defendant inched out he was hit by the plaintiff.

== Judgement ==
The judge ruled that both parties were to blame but attributed 80% of the blame to the plaintiff.

== Significance ==
The case is often quoted as an proving example of the liability incurred by motorcyclists when 'making a lane' and proceeding alongside traffic. As this is an operation fraught with potential hazards anyone undertaking it incurs liability for anything which may happen irrespective of whether they have right-of-way.
