= Staged crash =

Tactic for making a false insurance claim

A staged crash, or crash for cash is when criminals maneuver unsuspecting motorists into crashes in order to make false insurance claims. The cars generally suffer little damage in relation to the large demand that is then fraudulently submitted.

According to the Coalition Against Insurance Fraud, staged car crashes have been a growing criminal problem.

== History ==
In the 1990s, poor Hispanic immigrants were recruited to stage a "Swoop and Squat" scheme and drive the swoop cars: for which the immigrants could be paid only $100. One such driver, Jose Luis Lopez Perez, died after a swoop and squat crash, leading to an investigation which revealed the extent of this fraud.

In 2011, a group of seven people in North and South Carolina were arrested for allegedly stealing over $100,000 through staged crash schemes.

On October 16th, 2024, a Honda Civic cut off a woman driving on the Belt Parkway near Rosedale, New York and backed into her. Three passengers then got out of the car and acted injured, clutching their necks and taking photos of the other car's plates. The incident was caught on camera through the woman's dashcam, later going viral on TikTok and bringing attention to rising numbers of similar cases in the tri-state area. One of the passengers, a 28 year old Brooklyn resident, was later apprehended and charged with insurance fraud.

== Varieties of the scam ==
- The "Swoop and Squat" scheme involves two cars: one, the "swooper", swoops in front of the victim car and stops suddenly, causing a rear-end collision, while the other, the "squatter", drives beside the victim to prevent them from changing lanes to avoid rear-ending the car. The “swoop” car is usually driven by an experienced ring member, while the “squat” car is usually full of accomplices, who will claim that they were injured even if it was only a low-speed collision, submitting fraudulent claims to the insurance company. The "Swoop and Squat" scheme may also involve three cars that work in tandem to cause a car accident: one pulls in front of the victim, the ‘squatter’, another cuts the car off in front of the victim a couple of seconds afterward the ‘swooper’ cuts both off, forcing the “squat” car to brake, while the third pulls alongside the victim to box them in, causing the victim to rear-end the car in front of them. The “swoop” car drives away, leaving the victim responsible.
- The "Panic Stop" is like the ‘swoop and squat’, but the offending vehicle has passengers and gets in front of the victim's vehicle while a passenger watches and waits for the victim to be distracted, so they won't be able to react quickly enough to stop. The perpetrator then slams on the brakes causing a rear-end collision (usually with no brake lights).
- The "Sideswipe" happens at intersections that have dual left turn lanes. It involves a victim car that drifts into the adjacent lane by accident while making a turn. The perpetrator then rushes to crash into the victim that just drifted into their lane. Claiming innocence, the perpetrator then submits a claim to their insurer. The perpetrator may also drift into the victim’s lane and sideswipe them.
- The "Start and Stop" usually staged in gridlocked traffic. The perpetrator, placed in front of the victim, starts to move forward, making the victim believe traffic is moving finally. The victim follows, but the perpetrator then slams on the brakes before the victim can brake too, causing a rear-end collision.
- The "Wave-In" occurs when the victim is driving in heavy traffic and wants to change lanes. A supposedly good actor waves the victim forward, but while the victim is changing lanes, that person deliberately smashes into the victim's car. When police arrive, the bad actor denies having waved the victim forward, making the victim look careless and guilty. The scheme is mostly employed where cars are merging, or in parking lots.
- The "Hit and Run" occurs when a suspect driver uses a pre-damaged vehicle, drives it to a public location and falsely reports being involved in a hit and run accident. The police are often called to verify damages.
- "Shady Helpers" is a form of ambulance chasing that usually happens after a genuine crash has occurred. A fraud runner will solicit a crash victim and advertise the services of specific repair shops, chiropractors, or lawyers. These, in turn, will submit fraudulent claims on the victim's behalf or deceive the victim into undergoing unnecessary treatments or lawsuits.
- "Crash For Cash Scams" Crash for cash scammers choose their victims carefully – they keep an eye out for drivers who look like they would be fully insured but be less likely to cause a fuss. The criminals, in a car in front of the victim, slam on the brakes for no obvious reason, and the victim has no time to react and collides with the car in front. Another scenario (known as ‘flash for cash’) happens when a driver flashes their lights at a junction to let the victim out, then crashes into the victim's car deliberately. The other driver will insist the accident is the victim's fault. The scammer will then hand over their insurance details – sometimes already prepared and written down. A few weeks after the accident the victim's insurers will write to the victim with details of the other driver's claim which will be exaggerated with costs like car hire, recovery and whiplash injuries.

== Legislation ==
In recent years, authorities noted a significant increase in the number of staged accidents in Florida. The state ranks number one in staged car accidents across the US according to the National Insurance Crime Bureau and is the most expensive state for auto insurance. Being a no-fault insurance state that requires a certain amount of personal injury protection for auto insurance, insurance companies are required to pay up to $10,000 per person for medical treatment, regardless of who is at fault. Florida has since passed specific legislation (Florida Statutes 817.234) against faking a car crash in order to receive insurance money.

Other states have passed or are eyeing diverse legislation targeting efforts by gangs to bring in real and fake crash passengers to lodge phone crash-injury claims. At least 15 states and the District of Columbia have passed laws targeting runners of crash gangs or soliciting of real auto crash passengers.

== See also ==
- Pengci
