= Underinsured =

Being insured for some risks but not for others

Underinsured refers to various degrees of being insured for some real risks and uninsured for others, at the same time.

== Health care ==
Johns Hopkins University professor Vicente Navarro stated in 2003, "the problem does not end here, with the uninsured. An even larger problem is the underinsured" and "The most credible estimate of the number of people in the United States who have died because of lack of medical care was provided by a study carried out by Harvard Medical School. Professors Himmelstein and Woolhandler (New England Journal of Medicine 336, no. 11, 1997). They concluded that almost 100,000 people died in the United States each year because of lack of needed care—three times the number of people who died of AIDS."

== Auto insurance ==
In the auto insurance industry, underinsured motorist coverage is designed to protect motorists in the event that they have an accident with an at-fault underinsured motorist.
