= Traffic collision =

Incident when a vehicle collides with another object

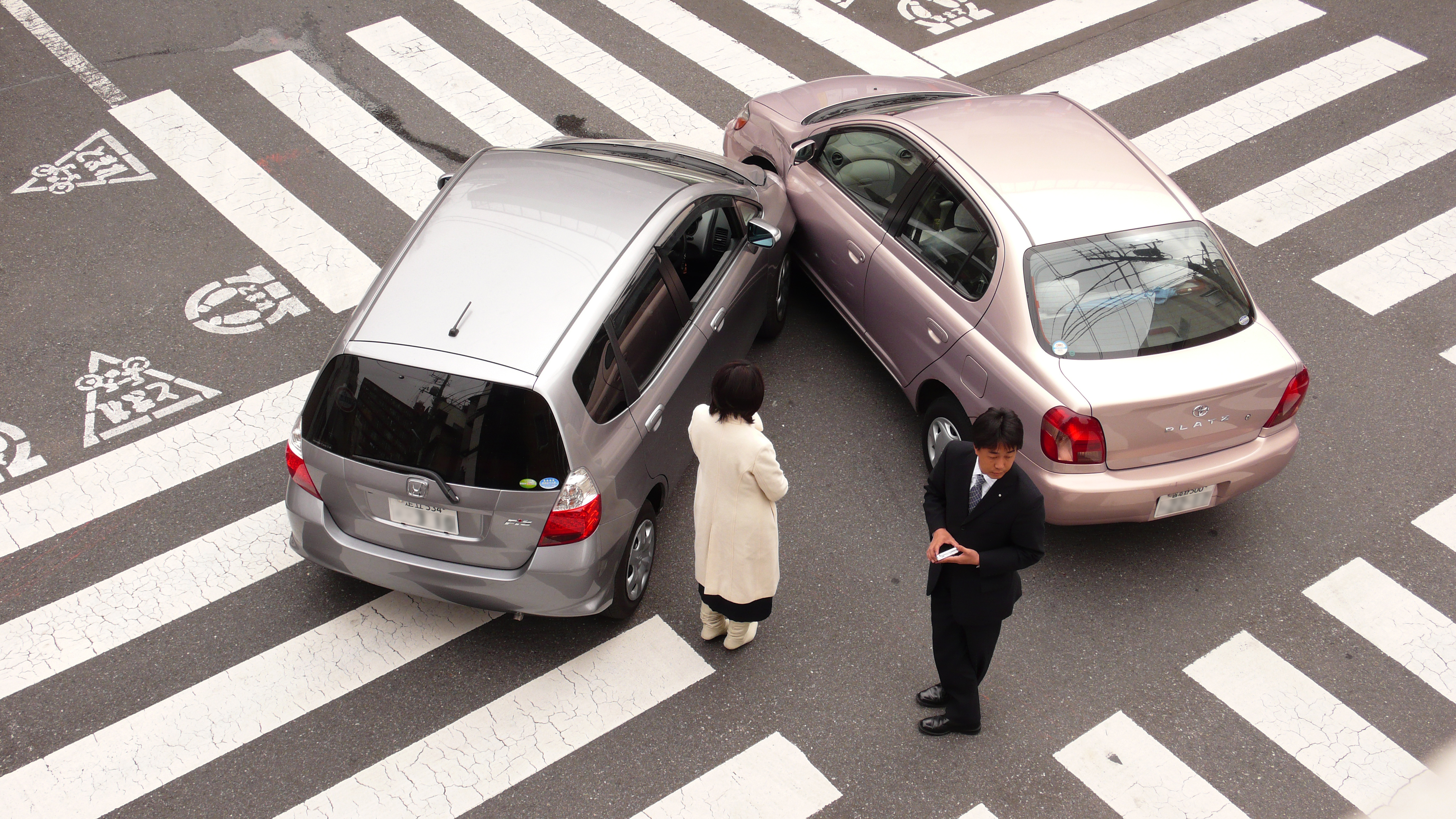
A traffic collision in Tokyo, Japan, 2007

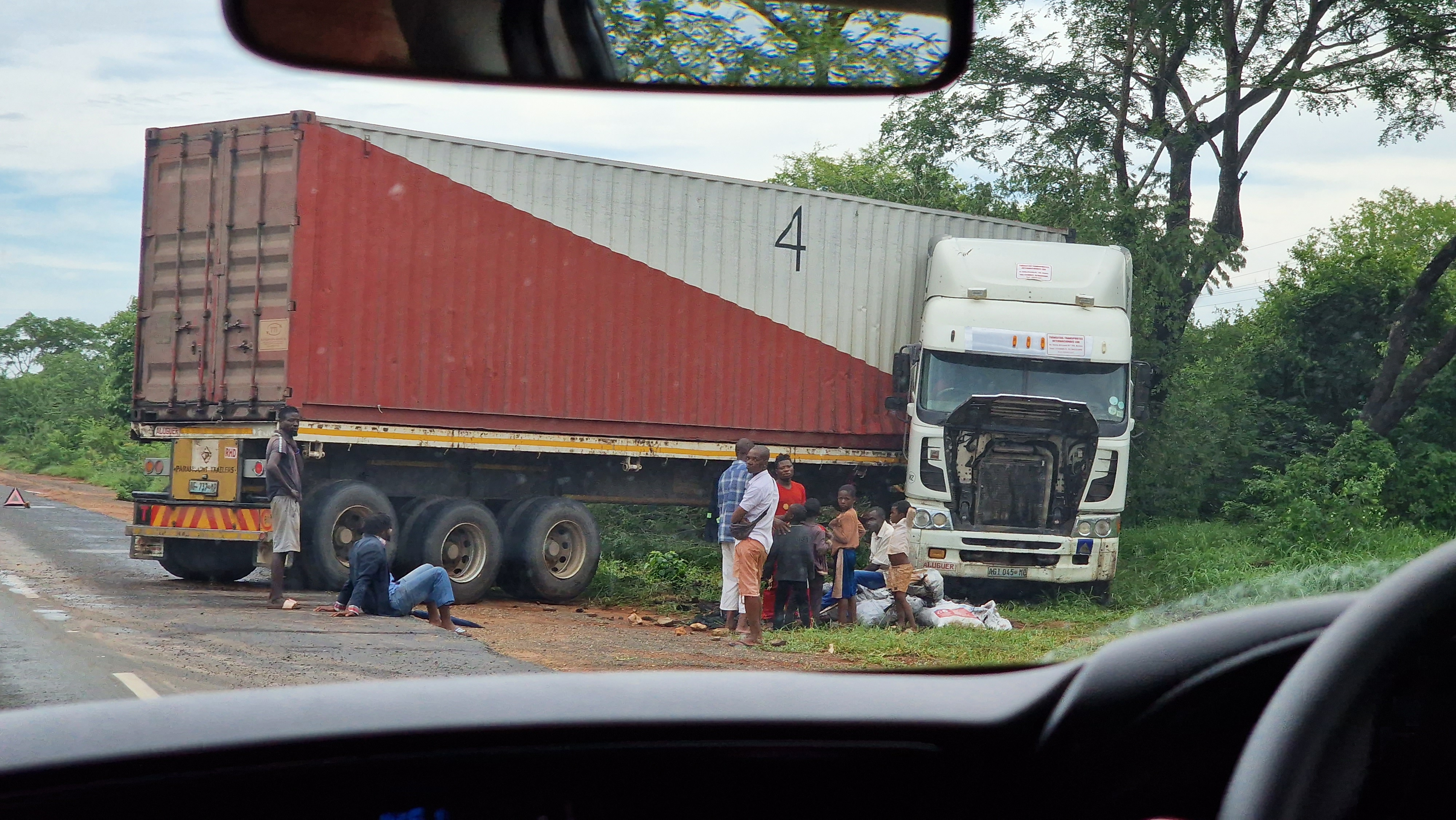
The aftermath of a crash involving a jackknifing truck, near Inhassoro, Mozambique, 2022

A traffic collision, also known as a motor vehicle collision or car crash, occurs when a vehicle collides with another vehicle, pedestrian, animal, road debris, or other moving or stationary obstruction, such as a tree, boulder, pole, or structure. Traffic collisions often result in injury, disability, death, and property damage as well as financial costs to both society and the individuals involved. Road transport is statistically the most dangerous situation people deal with on a daily basis, but casualty figures from such incidents attract less media attention than other, less frequent types of tragedy. The commonly used term car accident is increasingly falling out of favor with many government departments and organizations: the Associated Press style guide recommends caution before using the term and the National Union of Journalists advises against it in their Road Collision Reporting Guidelines. Some collisions are intentional vehicle-ramming attacks, staged crashes, vehicular homicide or vehicular suicide.

Several factors contribute to the risk of collisions, including vehicle design, speed of operation, road design, weather, road environment, driving skills, impairment due to alcohol or drugs, and behavior, notably aggressive driving, distracted driving, speeding and street racing.

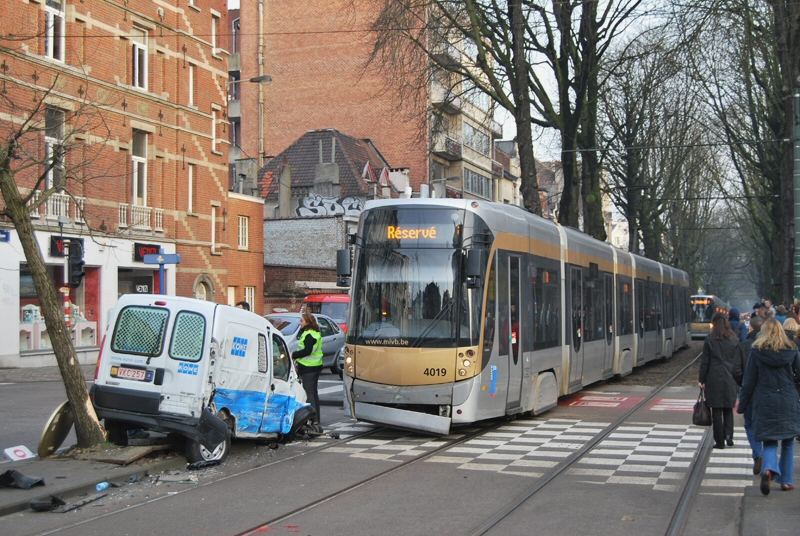
A collision in Brussels between a Renault Kangoo and a tram

In 2013, 54 million people worldwide sustained injuries from traffic collisions. This resulted in 1.4 million deaths in 2013, up from 1.1 million deaths in 1990. About 68,000 of these occurred with children less than five years old. Almost all high-income countries have decreasing death rates, while the majority of low-income countries have increasing death rates due to traffic collisions. Middle-income countries have the highest rate with 20 deaths per 100,000 inhabitants, accounting for 80% of all road fatalities with 52% of all vehicles. While the death rate in Africa is the highest (24.1 per 100,000 inhabitants), the lowest rate is to be found in Europe (10.3 per 100,000 inhabitants).

== Warning signs ==
Accident danger zone - Belarusian road sign

Accident area - Chinese road sign

Pedestrian accident blackspot ahead - Hong Kong road sign

A traffic accident has occurred - Danish road sign

Slow down, accident prone area - Filipino road sign

Accident - Bangladeshi road sign

Accident ahead - Thai road sign

Accident - Portuguese road sign

Accident - Azerbaijani road sign

A traffic accident has occurred - Bulgarian road sign

Traffic accident - Polish road sign

Accident ahead - Bosnian-Herzegovinian road sign

Traffic accident - Croatian road sign

Accident - Romanian road sign

Accident - Czech road sign

Accident - Estonian road sign

Accident - New Zealand road sign

Risk of accident with pedestrian - plate indicating a place of frequent accidents of nature portrayed by the plate - Polish road sign

variant – risk of rear-end accident with another vehicle

variant – risk of head-on accident with another vehicle

variant – risk of accident with a tram

variant – risk of accident with a train

T-15 "plate indicating a place of frequent accidents caused by slippery road surface due to rain"

== Terminology ==
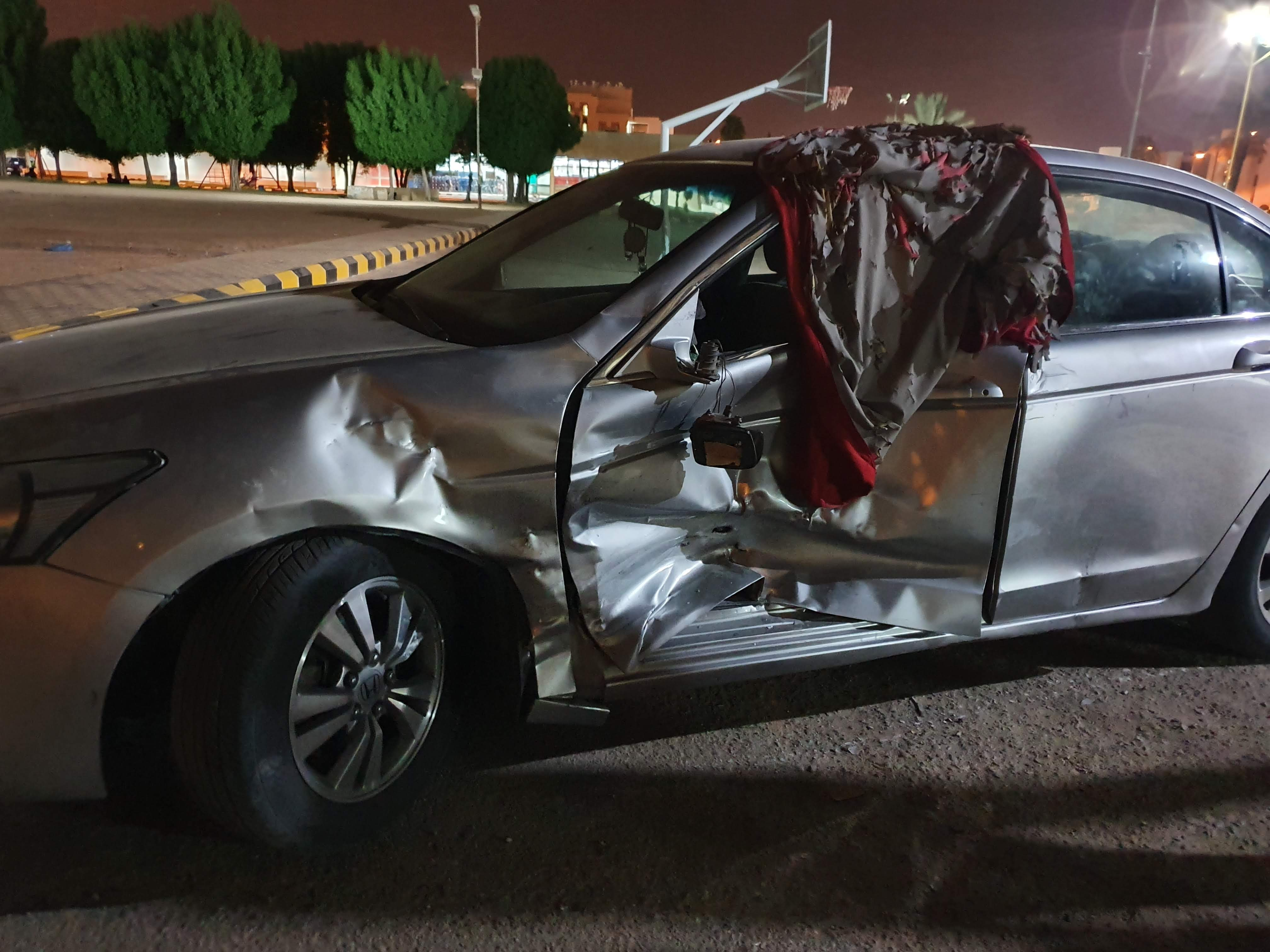
A Honda Accord after it collided with another vehicle

Traffic collisions can be classified by general types. Types of collision include head-on, road departure, rear-end, side collisions, and rollovers.

Many different terms are commonly used to describe vehicle collisions. The World Health Organization uses the term road traffic injury, while the U.S. Census Bureau uses the term motor vehicle accidents (MVA), and Transport Canada uses the term motor vehicle traffic collision (MVTC). Other common terms include auto accident, car accident, car crash, car smash, car wreck, motor vehicle collision (MVC), personal injury collision (PIC), road accident, road traffic accident (RTA), road traffic collision (RTC), and road traffic incident (RTI) as well as more unofficial terms including smash-up, pile-up, and fender bender.

=== Criticism of "accident" terminology ===
Many organizations, companies and government agencies have begun to avoid the term accident, instead preferring terms such as collision, crash or incident. This is because the term accident may imply that there is no one to blame or that the collision was unavoidable, whereas most traffic collisions are the result of driver error such as driving under the influence, excessive speed, distractions such as mobile phones, other risky behavior, poor road design, or other preventable factors.

In 1997, George L. Reagle, the Associate Administrator for Motor Carriers of the Federal Motor Carrier Safety Administration wrote a letter stating that "A crash is not an accident", emphasizing that the Department's Research and Special Programs Administration, the Federal Highway Administration, and the National Highway Traffic Safety Administration had all declared that "accident" should be avoided in their published writings and media communications. In 2016, the Associated Press updated its style guide to recommend that journalists use "crash, collision, or other terms" rather than "accident" unless culpability is proven. The AP also recommends avoiding "accident" when negligence is proven or claimed because the term "can be read as exonerating the person responsible." In 2021, the American Automobile Association (AAA) passed a resolution to replace "car accident" with "car crash" in their vocabulary. In 2022, the traffic management company INRIX announced that "accident" would be removed from their lexicon. In 2023, the National Union of Journalists in the UK published the Road Collision Reporting Guidelines which includes a recommendation that journalists should "Avoid use of the word ‘accident’ until the facts of a collision are known."

The Maryland Department of Transportation's Highway Safety Office emphasizes that "crashes are no accident", saying that "Using the word accident suggests that an incident was unavoidable, but many roadway crashes can be attributed to human error." The Michigan Department of Transportation states that "accident" should be dropped in favor of "crash", saying that "Traffic crashes are fixable problems, caused by inattentive drivers and driver behavior. They are not accidents." In line with their Vision Zero commitments, the Portland Bureau of Transportation recommends using "crash" rather than "accident".

On the contrary, some have criticized the use of terminology other than accident for holding back safety improvements, based on the idea that such terms perpetuate a culture of blame that may discourage the involved parties from fully disclosing the facts, and thus frustrate attempts to address the real root causes.

==== Intent ====
Some traffic collisions are caused intentionally by a driver. For example, a collision may be caused by a driver who intends to commit vehicular suicide. Collisions may also be intentionally caused by people who hope to make an insurance claim against the other driver or may be staged for such purposes as insurance fraud. Motor vehicles may also be involved in collisions as part of a deliberate effort to hurt other people, such as in a vehicle-ramming attack or vehicular homicide.

== Health effects ==
Death rate from road accidents

=== Physical ===
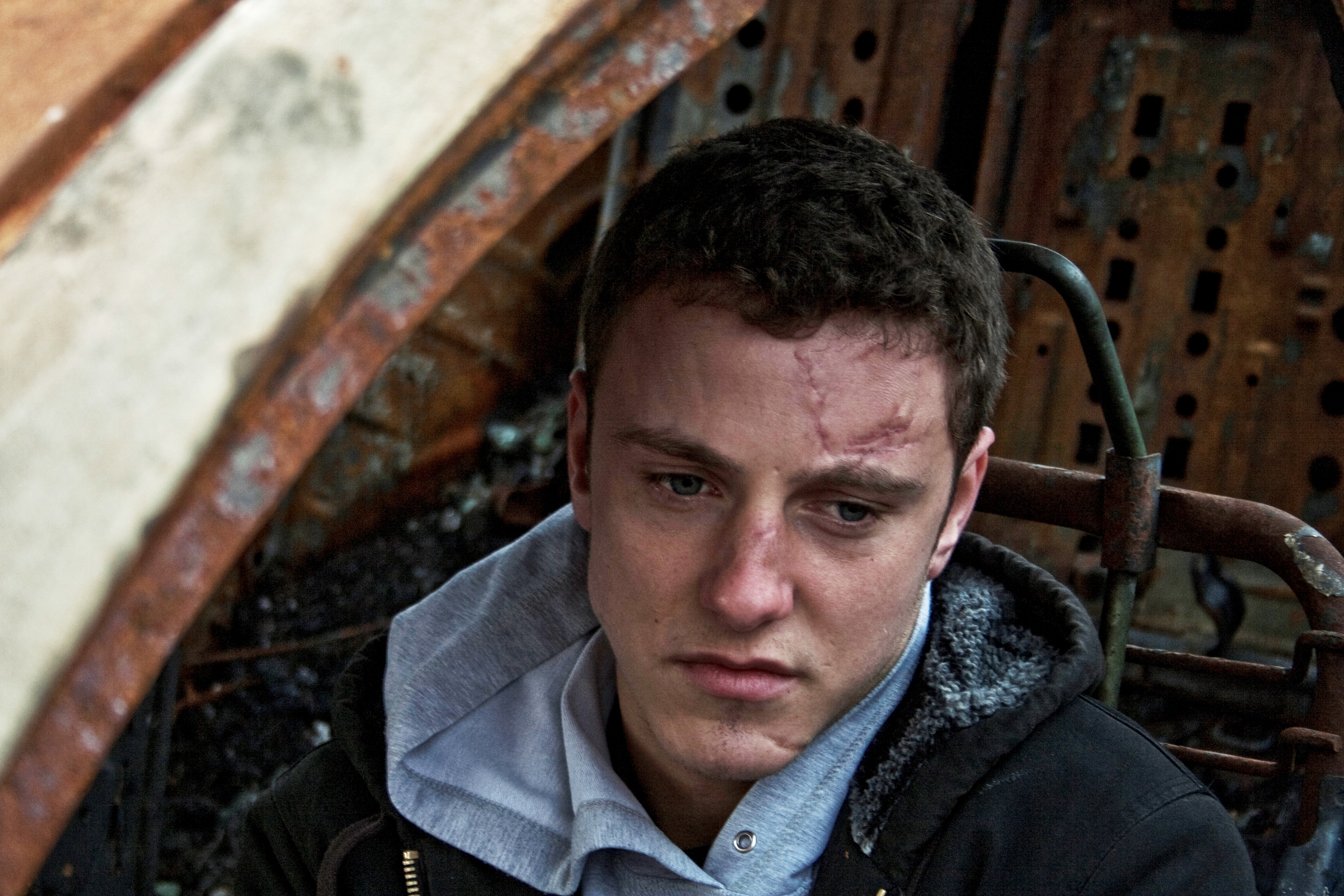
A man with visible facial scars resulting from a car collision

A number of physical injuries can commonly result from the blunt force trauma caused by a collision, ranging from bruising and contusions to catastrophic physical injury (e.g., paralysis), traumatic or non-traumatic cardiac arrest and death. The CDC estimates that roughly 100 people die in motor vehicle crashes each day in the United States.

=== Psychological ===
Following collisions, long-lasting psychological trauma may occur. These issues may make those who have been in a crash afraid to drive again. In some cases, psychological trauma may affect individuals' lives, causing difficulty going to work, attending school, or performing family responsibilities.

== Causes ==
Road incidents are caused by a large number of human factors such as failing to act according to weather conditions, road design, signage, speed limits, lighting conditions, pavement markings, and roadway obstacles. A 1985 study by K. Rumar, using British and American crash reports as data, suggested 57% of crashes were due solely to driver factors, 27% to the combined roadway and driver factors, 6% to the combined vehicle and driver factors, 3% solely to roadway factors, 3% to combined roadway, driver, and vehicle factors, 2% solely to vehicle factors, and 1% to combined roadway and vehicle factors. Reducing the severity of injury in crashes is more important than reducing incidence and ranking incidence by broad categories of causes is misleading regarding severe injury reduction. Vehicle and road modifications are generally more effective than behavioral change efforts with the exception of certain laws such as required use of seat belts, motorcycle helmets, and graduated licensing of teenagers.

=== Human factors ===
Human factors in vehicle collisions include anything related to drivers and other road users that may contribute to a collision. Examples include driver behavior, visual and auditory acuity, decision-making ability, and reaction speed.

A 1985 report based on British and American crash data found driver error, intoxication, and other human factors contribute wholly or partly to about 93% of crashes. A 2019 report from the U.S. National Highway Traffic Safety Administration found that leading contributing factors for fatal crashes included driving too fast for conditions or in excess of the speed limit, operating under the influence, failure to yield right of way, failure to keep within the proper lane, operating a vehicle in a careless manner, and distracted driving.

Drivers distracted by mobile devices had nearly four times greater risk of crashing their cars than those who were not. Research from the Virginia Tech Transportation Institute has found that drivers who are texting while driving are 23 times more likely to be involved in a crash as non-texting drivers. Dialing a phone is the most dangerous distraction, increasing a drivers' chance of crashing by 12 times, followed by reading or writing, which increased the risk by ten times.

An RAC survey of British drivers found 78% of drivers thought they were highly skilled at driving, and most thought they were better than other drivers, a result suggesting overconfidence in their abilities. Nearly all drivers who had been in a crash did not believe themselves to be at fault. One survey of drivers reported that they thought the key elements of good driving were:

- controlling a car including a good awareness of the car's size and capabilities
- reading and reacting to road conditions, weather, road signs, and the environment
- alertness, reading and anticipating the behavior of other drivers.

Although proficiency in these skills is taught and tested as part of the driving exam, a "good" driver can still be at a high risk of crashing because:

the feeling of being confident in more and more challenging situations is experienced as evidence of driving ability, and that 'proven' ability reinforces the feelings of confidence. Confidence feeds itself and grows unchecked until something happens – a near-miss or an accident.

An Axa survey concluded Irish drivers are very safety-conscious relative to other European drivers. This does not translate to significantly lower crash rates in Ireland.

Accompanying changes to road designs have been wide-scale adoptions of rules of the road alongside law enforcement policies that included drunk-driving laws, setting of speed limits, and speed enforcement systems such as speed cameras. Some countries' driving tests have been expanded to test a new driver's behavior during emergencies, and their hazard perception.

There are demographic differences in crash rates. For example, although young people tend to have good reaction times, disproportionately more young male drivers feature in collisions, with researchers observing that many exhibit behaviors and attitudes to risk that can place them in more hazardous situations than other road users. This is reflected by actuaries when they set insurance rates for different age groups, partly based on their age, sex, and choice of vehicle. Older drivers with slower reactions might be expected to be involved in more collisions, but this has not been the case as they tend to drive less and, apparently, more cautiously. Attempts to impose traffic policies can be complicated by local circumstances and driver behavior. In 1969 Leeming warned that there is a balance to be struck when "improving" the safety of a road.

Conversely, a location that does not look dangerous may have a high crash frequency. This is, in part, because if drivers perceive a location as hazardous, they take more care. Collisions may be more likely to happen when hazardous road or traffic conditions are not obvious at a glance, or where the conditions are too complicated for the limited human machine to perceive and react in the time and distance available. High incidence of crashes is not indicative of high injury risk. Crashes are common in areas of high vehicle congestion, but fatal crashes occur disproportionately on rural roads at night when traffic is relatively light.

This phenomenon has been observed in risk compensation research, where the predicted reductions in collision rates have not occurred after legislative or technical changes. One study observed that the introduction of improved brakes resulted in more aggressive driving, and another argued that compulsory seat belt laws have not been accompanied by a clearly attributed fall in overall fatalities. Most claims of risk compensation offsetting the effects of vehicle regulation and belt use laws have been discredited by research using more refined data.

In the 1990s, Hans Monderman's studies of driver behavior led him to the realization that signs and regulations had an adverse effect on a driver's ability to interact safely with other road users. Monderman developed shared space principles, rooted in the principles of the woonerven of the 1970s. He concluded that the removal of highway clutter, while allowing drivers and other road users to mingle with equal priority, could help drivers recognize environmental clues. They relied on their cognitive skills alone, reducing traffic speeds radically and resulting in lower levels of road casualties and lower levels of congestion.

Some crashes are intended; staged crashes, for example, involve at least one party who hopes to crash a vehicle in order to submit lucrative claims to an insurance company. In the United States during the 1990s, criminals recruited Latin American immigrants to deliberately crash cars, usually by cutting in front of another car and slamming on the brakes. It was an illegal and risky job, and they were typically paid only $100. Jose Luis Lopez Perez, a staged crash driver, died after one such maneuver, leading to an investigation that uncovered the increasing frequency of this type of crash.

==== Motor vehicle speed ====
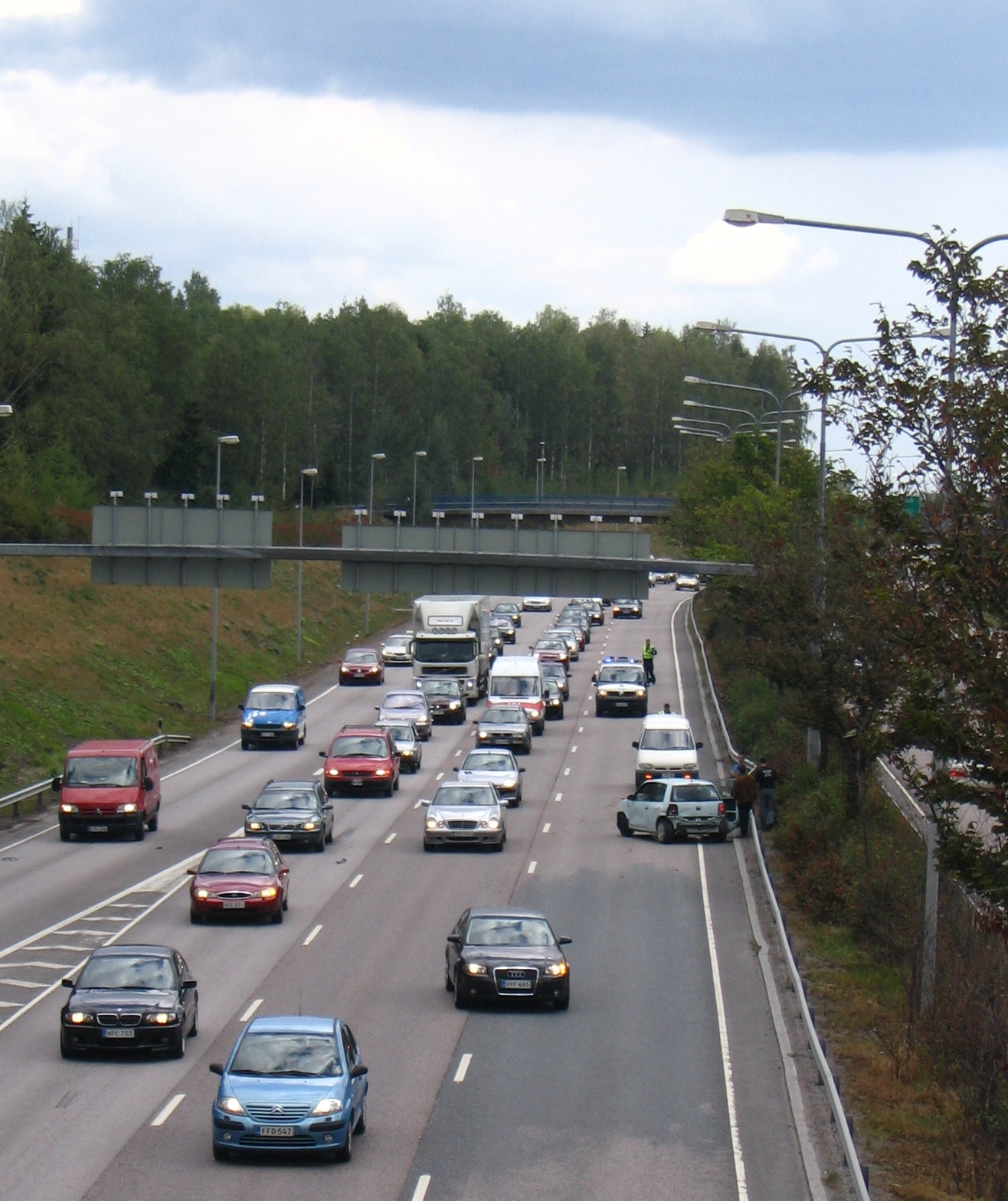
A crash on Ring I in Helsinki, Finland, on August 25, 2006, at around 13:00 local time. The incident caused traffic congestion.

The U.S. Department of Transportation's Federal Highway Administration reviewed research on traffic speed in 1998. The summary says that:

- The evidence shows the risk of having a crash is increased both for vehicles traveling slower than the average speed and for those traveling above the average speed.
- The risk of being injured increases exponentially with speeds much faster than the median speed.
- The severity/lethality of a crash depends on the vehicle speed change at impact.
- There is limited evidence suggesting lower speed limits result in lower speeds on a system-wide basis.
- Most crashes related to speed involve speed too fast for the conditions.
- More research is needed to determine the effectiveness of traffic calming.

In the U.S. in 2018, 9,378 people were killed in motor vehicle crashes involving at least one speeding driver, which accounted for 26% of all traffic-related deaths for the year.

In Michigan in 2019, excessive speed was a factor in 18.8% of the fatalities that resulted from fatal motor vehicle crashes and in 15.6% of the suspected serious injuries resulting from crashes.

The Road and Traffic Authority (RTA) of the Australian state of New South Wales (NSW) asserts speeding (traveling too fast for the prevailing conditions or above the posted speed limit) is a factor in about 40 percent of road deaths. The RTA also says speeding increases the risk of a crash and its severity. On another web page, the RTA qualifies its claims by referring to one specific piece of research from 1997, and writes "Research has shown that the risk of a crash causing death or injury increases rapidly, even with small increases above an appropriately set speed limit."

The contributory factor report in the official British road casualty statistics shows for 2006, that "exceeding the speed limit" was a contributory factor in 5% of all casualty crashes (14% of all fatal crashes), and "traveling too fast for conditions" was a contributory factor in 11% of all casualty crashes (18% of all fatal crashes).

In France, in 2018, the speed limit was reduced from 90 km/h to 80 km/h on a large part of the local outside built-up area road network in the sole aim of reducing the number of road fatalities.

==== Assured clear distance ahead ====
A common cause of collisions is driving faster than one can stop within their field of vision. Such practice is illegal and is particularly responsible for an increase in fatalities at night – when it occurs most.

==== Driver impairment ====
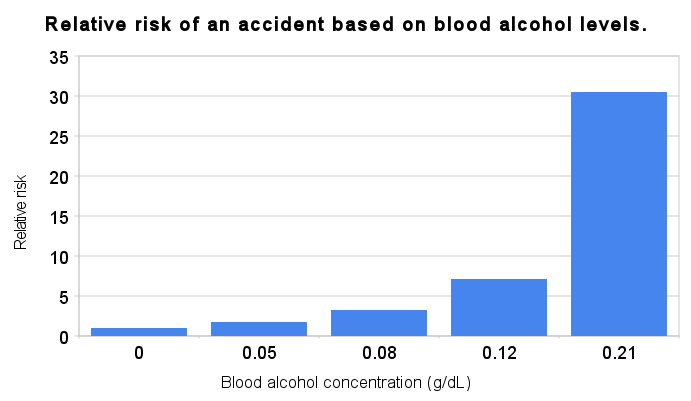
Relative risk of collisions based on blood alcohol levels

A graph outlining the relationship between the number of hours driven and the percentage of commercial truck crashes related to driver fatigue

Driver impairment describes factors that prevent the driver from driving at their normal level of skill. Common impairments include:

Alcohol
According to the Government of Canada, coroner reports from 2008 suggested almost 40% of fatally injured drivers consumed some quantity of alcohol before the collision.
Physical impairment
Poor eyesight and/or physical impairment, with many jurisdictions setting simple sight tests and/or requiring appropriate vehicle modifications before being allowed to drive.
Youth
Insurance statistics demonstrate a notably higher incidence of collisions and fatalities among drivers aged in their teens or early twenties, with insurance rates reflecting this data. These drivers have the highest incidence of both collisions and fatalities among all driver age groups, a fact that was observed well before the advent of mobile phones.

Females in this age group exhibit somewhat lower collision and fatality rates than males but still register well above the median for drivers of all ages. Also within this group, the highest collision incidence rate occurs within the first year of licensed driving. For this reason, many US states have enacted a zero-tolerance policy wherein receiving a moving violation within the first six months to one year of obtaining a license results in automatic license suspension. South Dakota is the only state that allows fourteen-year-olds to obtain drivers' licenses.

Old age
Old age, with some jurisdictions requiring driver retesting for reaction speed and eyesight after a certain age.
Sleep deprivation

Various factors such as fatigue or sleep deprivation might increase the risk, or the number of hours of driving might increase the risk of an incident. 41% of drivers self-report having fallen asleep at the wheel. It is estimated that 15% of fatal crashes involve drowsiness (10% of daytime crashes, and 24% of nighttime crashes). Work factors can increase the risk of drowsy driving such as long or irregular hours or driving at night.

Drug use
Including some prescription drugs, over-the-counter drugs (notably antihistamines, opioids and muscarinic antagonists), and illegal drugs.
Distraction
Research suggests that the driver's attention is affected by distracting sounds such as conversations and operating a mobile phone while driving. Many jurisdictions now restrict or outlaw the use of some types of phones in the car. Recent research conducted by British scientists suggests that music can also have an effect; classical music is considered to be calming, yet too much could relax the driver to a condition of distraction. On the other hand, hard rock may encourage the driver to step on the acceleration pedal, thus creating a potentially dangerous situation on the road.

Cell phone use is an increasingly significant problem on the roads and the U.S. National Safety Council compiled more than 30 studies postulating that hands-free is not a safer option because the brain remains distracted by the conversation and cannot focus solely on the task of driving.

==== Combinations ====
Several conditions can combine to create a more dangerous situation, for example, low doses of alcohol and cannabis have a more severe effect on driving performance than either in isolation. Taking recommended doses of several drugs together, which individually do not cause impairment, may cause drowsiness. This could be more pronounced in an elderly person whose renal function is less efficient than a younger person's.

=== Road design ===
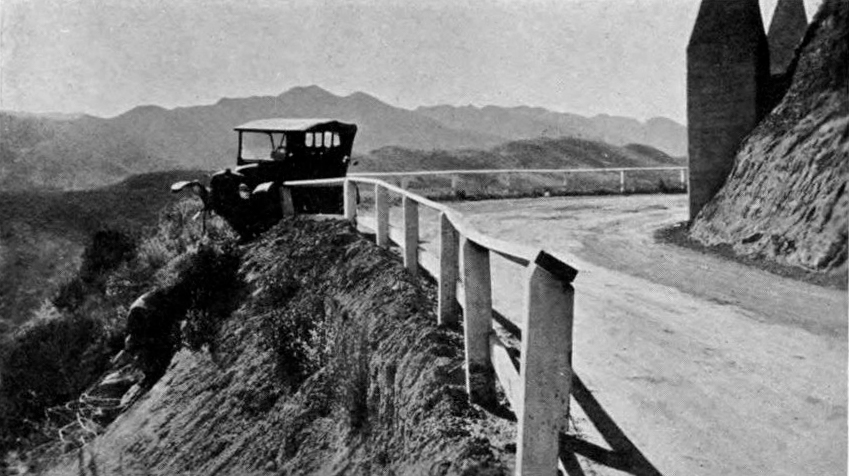
A potential long fall stopped by an early guardrail, c. 1920. Guardrails, median barriers, or other physical objects can help reduce the consequences of a collision, or minimize damage.

A 1985 US study showed that about 34% of serious crashes had contributing factors related to the roadway or its environment. Most of these crashes also involved a human factor. The road or environmental factor was either noted as making a significant contribution to the circumstances of the crash or did not allow room to recover. In these circumstances, it is frequently the driver who is blamed rather than the road; those reporting the collisions have a tendency to overlook the human factors involved, such as the subtleties of design and maintenance that a driver could fail to observe or inadequately compensate for.

Research has shown that careful design and maintenance, with well-designed intersections, road surfaces, visibility and traffic control devices, can result in significant improvements in collision rates.

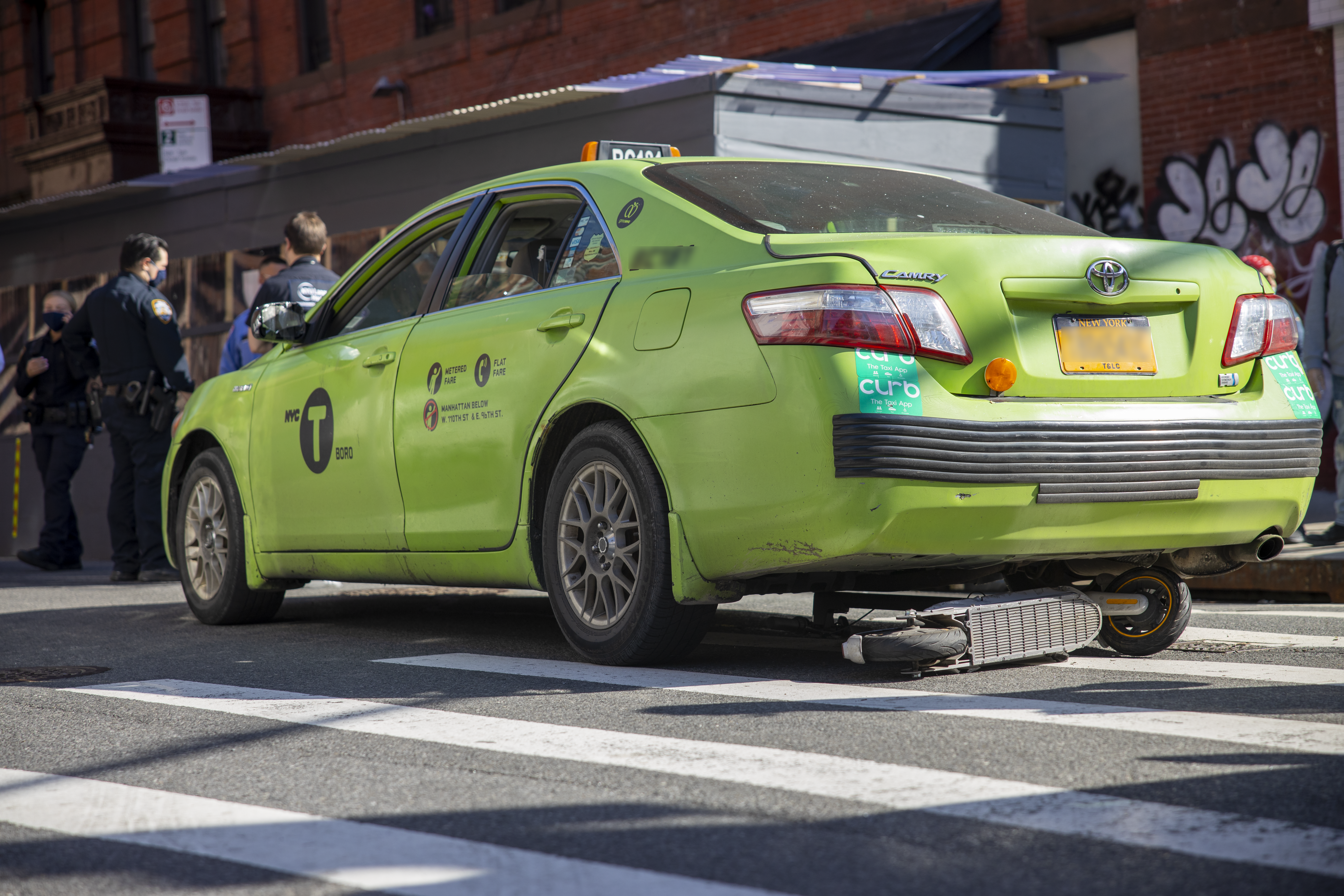
Electric scooter crash in New York City

Individual roads also have widely differing performance in the event of an impact. In Europe, there are now EuroRAP tests that indicate how "self-explaining" and forgiving a particular road and its roadside would be in the event of a major incident.

In the UK, research has shown that investment in a safe road infrastructure program could yield a 1/3 reduction in road deaths, saving as much as £6 billion per year. A consortium of 13 major road safety stakeholders had formed the Campaign for Safe Road Design, which was calling on the UK Government to make safe road design a national transport priority.

=== Vehicle design and maintenance ===
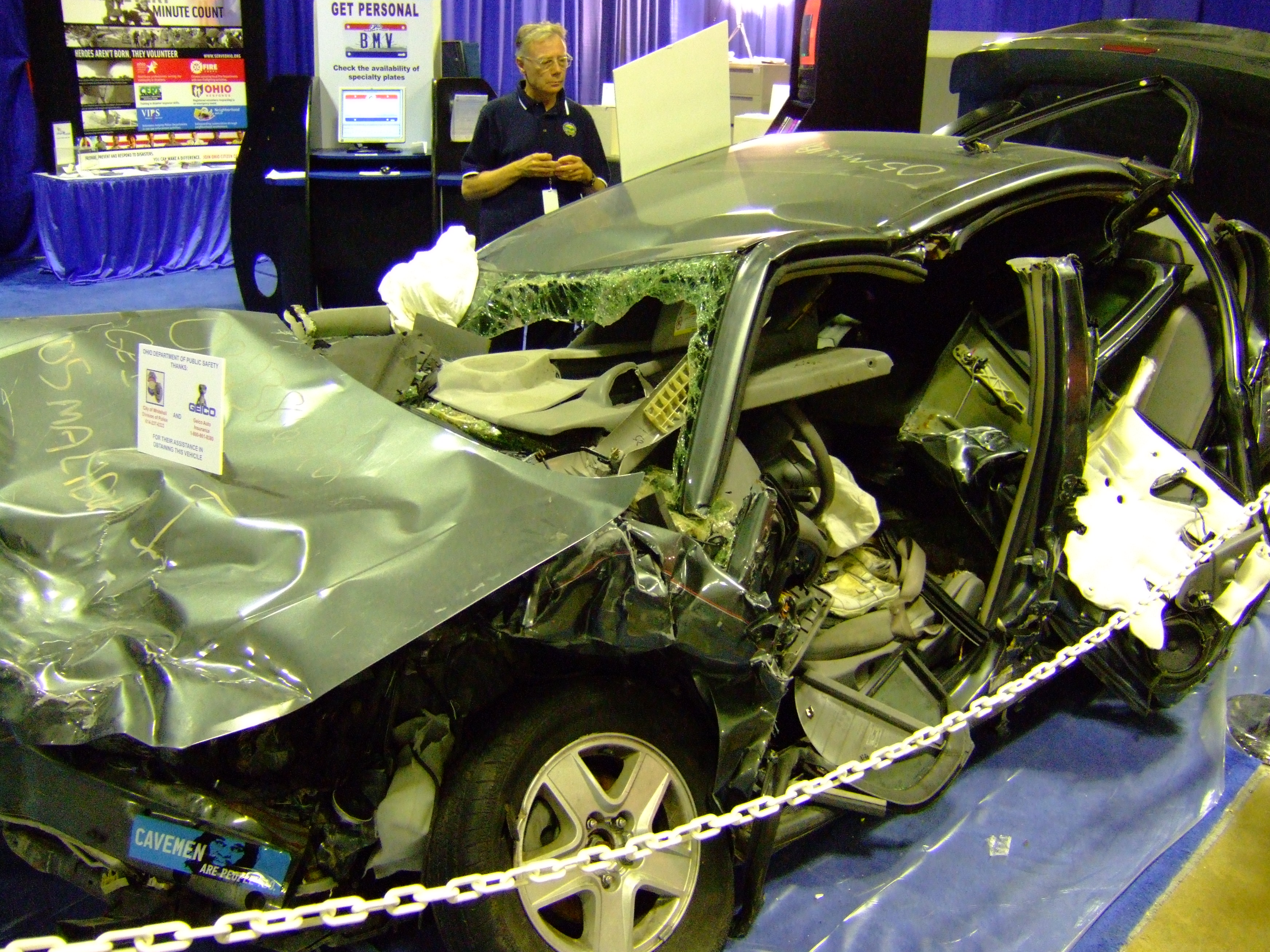
A 2005 Chevrolet Malibu involved in a rollover crash

Seat belts

Research has shown that, across all collision types, it is less likely that seat belts were worn in collisions involving death or serious injury, rather than light injury; wearing a seat belt reduces the risk of death by about 45 percent. Seat belt use is controversial, with notable critics such as Professor John Adams suggesting that their use may lead to a net increase in road casualties due to a phenomenon known as risk compensation. Observation of driver behaviors before and after seat belt laws does not support the risk compensation hypothesis.

Several driving behaviors were observed on the road before and after the belt use law was enforced in Newfoundland, and in Nova Scotia during the same period without a law. Belt use increased from 16 percent to 77 percent in Newfoundland and remained virtually unchanged in Nova Scotia. Four driver behaviors (speed, stopping at intersections when the control light was amber, turning left in front of oncoming traffic, and gaps in following distance) were measured at various sites before and after the law. Changes in these behaviors in Newfoundland were similar to those in Nova Scotia, except that drivers in Newfoundland drove slower on expressways after the law, contrary to the risk compensation theory.

Maintenance

A well-designed and well-maintained vehicle, with good brakes, tires and well-adjusted suspension will be more controllable in an emergency and thus be better equipped to avoid collisions. Some mandatory vehicle inspection schemes include tests for some aspects of roadworthiness, such as the UK's MOT test or German TÜV conformance inspection.

The design of vehicles has also evolved to improve protection after collision, both for vehicle occupants and for those outside of the vehicle. Much of this work was led by automotive industry competition and technological innovation, leading to measures such as Saab's safety cage and reinforced roof pillars of 1946, Ford's 1956 Lifeguard safety package, and Saab and Volvo's introduction of standard fit seatbelts in 1959. Other initiatives were accelerated as a reaction to consumer pressure, after publications such as Ralph Nader's 1965 book Unsafe at Any Speed accused motor manufacturers of indifference to safety.

In the early 1970s, British Leyland started an intensive program of vehicle safety research, producing a number of prototype experimental safety vehicles demonstrating various innovations for occupant and pedestrian protection such as airbags, anti-lock brakes, impact-absorbing side-panels, front and rear head restraints, run-flat tires, smooth and deformable front-ends, impact-absorbing bumpers, and retractable headlamps. The design has also been influenced by government legislation, such as the Euro NCAP impact test.

Common features designed to improve safety include thicker pillars, safety glass, interiors with no sharp edges, stronger bodies, other active or passive safety features, and smooth exteriors to reduce the consequences of an impact on pedestrians.

The UK Department for Transport publish road casualty statistics for each type of collision and vehicle through its Road Casualties Great Britain report. These statistics show a ten-to-one ratio of in-vehicle fatalities between types of cars. In most cars, occupants have a 2–8% chance of death in a two-car collision.

Center of gravity

Some crash types tend to have more serious consequences. Rollovers have become more common in recent years, perhaps due to the increased popularity of taller SUVs, people carriers, and minivans, which have a higher center of gravity than standard passenger cars. Rollovers can be fatal, especially if the occupants are ejected because they were not wearing seat belts (83% of ejections during rollovers were fatal when the driver did not wear a seat belt, compared to 25% when they did). After a first-generation Mercedes-Benz A-Class notoriously failed a 'moose test' (sudden swerving to avoid an obstacle) in 1997, some manufacturers enhanced suspension using stability control linked to an anti-lock braking system to reduce the likelihood of rollover. After retrofitting these systems to its models in 1999–2000, Mercedes saw its models involved in fewer crashes.

Now, about 40% of new US vehicles, mainly the SUVs, vans and pickup trucks that are more susceptible to rollover, are being produced with a lower center of gravity and enhanced suspension with stability control linked to its anti-lock braking system to reduce the risk of rollover and meet US federal requirements that mandate anti-rollover technology by September 2011.

Motorcycles

Motorcyclists and pillion-riders have little protection other than their clothing and helmets.This difference is reflected in the casualty statistics, where they are more than twice as likely to suffer severely after a collision. In 2005, there were 198,735 road crashes with 271,017 reported casualties on roads in Great Britain. This included 3,201 deaths (1.1%) and 28,954 serious injuries (10.7%) overall. Of these casualties 178,302 (66%) were car users and 24,824 (9%) were motorcyclists, of whom 569 were killed (2.3%) and 5,939 seriously injured (24%).Motorcyclists in urban areas are also more prone to deadly accidents because urban areas are more populous and roads are more crowded with vehicles.

=== Sociological factors ===
Studies in United States have shown that poor people have a greater risk of dying in a car crash than people who are well-off. Car deaths are also higher in poorer states.There is also data that suggests that there is no significant association between injurity severity and socioeconomic status, despite the fact that people with low socioeconomic status are more at risk to be hospitalized for injuries sustained in traffic collisions.

Similar studies in France or Israel have shown the same results. This may be due to working-class people having less access to secure equipment in cars, having older cars which are less protected against crash, and needing to cover more distance to go to work each day.

=== COVID-19 lockdown impact ===
While the advent of the COVID lockdown meant a decrease in road traffic in the United States, the rates of incidents, speeding, and traffic fatalities rose in 2020 and 2021 (rate as measured against vehicle miles traveled). The traffic fatality rate jumped to 1.25 per 100 million vehicle miles traveled, up from 1.06 during the same period in 2019. Reasons cited for the increases are greater speeds, not wearing seatbelts, and driving while impaired.

In their preliminary report covering the first six months of 2021, the US nonprofit public safety advocacy group, the National Safety Council (NSC) estimated of total motor-vehicle deaths for the first six months of 2021 were 21,450, up 16% from 2020 and up 17% from 18,384 in 2019. The estimated mileage death rate in 2021 was 1.43 deaths per 100 million vehicle miles traveled, up 3% from 1.39 in 2020 and up 24% from 1.15 in 2019.

Preliminary data also show that even as traffic levels returned to normal after the onset of COVID in March–April 2020, drivers continued to drive at excessive speeds. A 2020 study conducted by INRIX, private company that analyzes traffic patters, behaviors and congestion, showed that as traffic levels returned to normal during the three-month period August to October 2020, growth in collisions (57%), outpaced the growth in miles traveled (22%) resulting in a higher than normal collision rate during this period.

In France, the Ministry of Interior reported that traffic incidents, crash-related injuries, and fatalities dropped in 2020 compared with 2019. Fatalities dropped 21.4%, injuries dropped 20.9%, and incidents overall dropped 20%. It also reported that the number of vehicles on the road dropped by 75%, which suggests the rate (incidents per vehicle-mile) increased.

=== Other ===
Other possibly hazardous factors that may alter a driver's soundness on the road include:

- Irritability
- Following specifically distinct rules too bureaucratically, inflexibly or rigidly when unique circumstances might suggest otherwise
- Sudden swerving into somebody's blind spot without first clearly making oneself visible through the wing mirror
- Unfamiliarity with one's dashboard features, center console or other interior handling devices after a recent car purchase
- Lack of visibility due to windshield design, dense fog or sun glare
- People-watching.
- Traffic safety culture, a variety of aspects of safety culture could impact on the number of crashes.

== Prevention ==
Many interventions have been implemented or proposed regarding the prevention of motor vehicle crashes. Other interventions are aimed at pedestrian or cyclist safety, and reducing the severity of injuries or death in collisions that do occur. In the United States, younger drivers (aged 16-20) have a much higher fatality rate than other drivers. Graduated driver's licensing, with restrictions for younger drivers such as limiting the number of passengers in the car, or restrictions on night driving, have shown success with regards to reducing fatal crashes in teenagers. Technology that monitors teenage drivers' behavior and provides feedback and recommendations has also been associated with improved safety for teenage drivers.

Law enforcement patrols to enforce road safety laws such as seatbelt use, safe speed and drug or alcohol impaired driving has been associated with reduced road fatalities. Automated traffic enforcement measures, such as speed cameras or sensors, have reduced crashes resulting in injuries by 20-25%.

Accident avoidance technology in cars such as forward collision warning, driver monitoring with alarms for distraction, sleeping, or impairment, lane keep assist, electronic stability control and traction control may also reduce collisions and fatalities, but data is lacking. Data show injuries can be reduced with self-driving cars.

Roundabouts reduce motor vehicle fatalities at intersections by reducing the speed of travel through an intersection and changing the vector of travel. Installation of roundabouts has been shown to reduce all crashes by 38% and crashes resulting in serious injury or death by 90%.

Reducing road speed limits, installing physical barriers to separate cyclists and pedestrians from the roadway and motor vehicles, improved lighting and discouraging non-intersection crossing (jaywalking) has been shown to improve safety of pedestrians and cyclists.

Vehicle safety features such as seatbelts, advanced airbags have been shown to reduce serious injuries or fatalities from traffic collisions. Seatbelt non-use is thought to contribute to about 50% of all traffic collision deaths.

Improvements in post-crash medical care such as improved emergency medical service response times, less distance to a trauma center are associated with a lower fatality rate from traffic collisions.

Electronic collision notification systems are sensors in the car or someone's cell phone that can alert emergency services in the event of a major collision using the local cellular network. Improved cell phone network coverage, better integration with emergency services, and removal of subscriptions fees are interventions advocated by some public health experts to make these potentially lifesaving collision notification systems available to all.

=== United Nations ===
Owing to the global and massive scale of the issue, the United Nations and its subsidiary bodies have passed resolutions and held conferences on the issue. The first United Nations General Assembly resolution and debate was in 2003 The World Day of Remembrance for Road Traffic Victims was declared in 2005. In 2009 the first high level ministerial conference on road safety was held in Moscow.

The World Health Organization, in its Global Status Report on Road Safety 2009, estimates that over 90% of the world's fatalities on the roads occur in low-income and middle-income countries, which have only 48% of the world's registered vehicles, and predicts road traffic injuries will rise to become the fifth leading cause of death by 2030.

The United Nations' Sustainable Development Goal 3, target 3.6 is directed at reducing road injuries and deaths. February 2020 saw a global ministerial conference which brought the Stockholm Declaration, setting a target to reduce global traffic deaths and injuries by 50% within ten years. The decade of 2021–2030 was declared the second decade of road safety.

=== Collision migration ===
Collisions migration refers to a situation where action to reduce road traffic collisions in one place may result in those collisions resurfacing elsewhere. For example, an accident blackspot may occur at a dangerous bend. The treatment for this may be to increase signage, post an advisory speed limit, apply a high-friction road surface, add crash barriers or any one of a number of other visible interventions. The immediate result may be to reduce collisions at the bend, but the subconscious relaxation on leaving the "dangerous" bend may cause drivers to act with fractionally less care on the rest of the road, resulting in an increase in collisions elsewhere on the road, and no overall improvement over the area. In the same way, increasing familiarity with the treated area will often result in a reduction over time to the previous level of care and may result in faster speeds around the bend due to perceived increased safety (risk compensation).

== Epidemiology ==
Death rates road incidents

Unlike most other developed countries, per capita traffic collision deaths in the US reversed their decline in the early 2010s.

In 2004, 50 million more were injured in motor vehicle collisions. In 2013, between 1.25 million and 1.4 million people were killed in traffic collisions, up from 1.1 million deaths in 1990. That number represents about 2.5% of all deaths. Approximately 50 million additional people were injured in traffic collisions, a number unchanged from 2004.

India recorded 105,000 traffic deaths in a year, followed by China with over 96,000 deaths. This makes motor vehicle collisions the leading cause of injury and death among children worldwide 10–19 years old (260,000 children die a year, 10 million are injured) and the sixth leading preventable cause of death in the United States. In 2019, there were 36,096 people killed and 2.74 million people injured in motor vehicle traffic crashes on roadways in the United States. In the state of Texas alone, there were a total of 415,892 traffic collisions, including 3,005 fatal crashes in 2012. In Canada, they are the cause of 48% of severe injuries.

=== Crash rates ===
The safety performance of roadways is almost always reported as a rate. That is, some measure of harm (deaths, injuries, or number of crashes) divided by some measure of exposure to the risk of this harm. Rates are used so the safety performance of different locations can be compared, and to prioritize safety improvements.

Common rates related to road traffic fatalities include the number of deaths per capita, per registered vehicle, per licensed driver, or per vehicle mile or kilometer traveled. Simple counts are almost never used. The annual count of fatalities is a rate, namely, the number of fatalities per year.

There is no one rate that is superior to others in any general sense, it depends on the question asked and the available data. Some agencies concentrate on crashes per total vehicle distance traveled and others combine rates. Iowa, for example, selects high collision locations based on a combination of crashes per million miles traveled, crashes per mile per year, and value loss (crash severity).

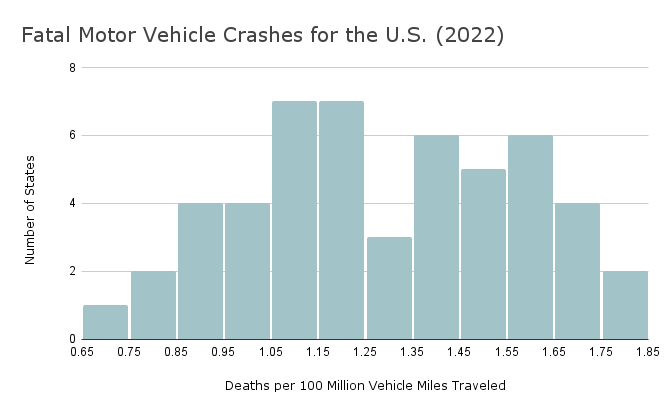
Number of states in the United States and their number of deaths per 100 million vehicle miles traveled in 2022

=== Fatality ===
The definition of a road-traffic fatality varies from country to country. In the United States, the definition used in the Fatality Analysis Reporting System (FARS) run by the National Highway Traffic Safety Administration (NHTSA) is a person who dies within 30 days of a crash on a US public road involving a vehicle with an engine, the death being the result of the crash.

Trend of road traffic fatalities in Italy by user category: drivers, pedestrians, and passengers, from 2013 to 2023

In the U.S., therefore, if a driver has a non-fatal heart attack that leads to a road-traffic crash that causes death, that is a road-traffic fatality. If the heart attack causes death prior to the crash, it is not a road-traffic fatality.

The definition of a road-traffic fatality can change with time in the same country. For example, fatality was defined in France as a person who dies in the six days (pre 2005) after the collision and was subsequently changed to the 30 days (post 2005) after the collision.

== History ==
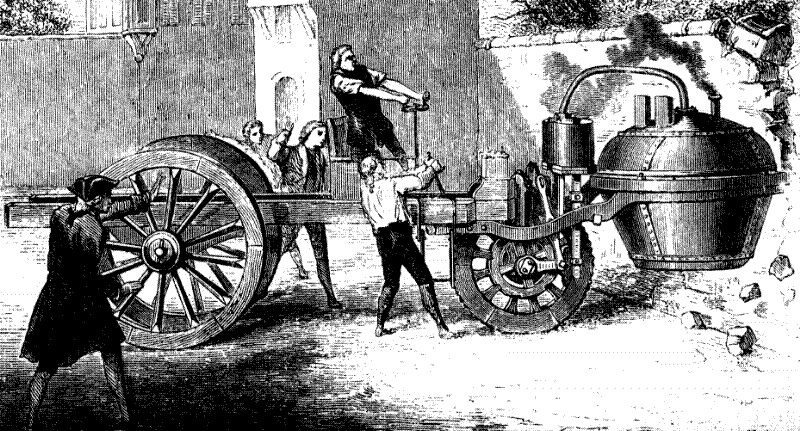
The fardier à vapeur of Nicolas-Joseph Cugnot allegedly crashed into a wall in 1771.

The world's first recorded road traffic death involving a motor vehicle occurred on 31 August 1869. Irish scientist Mary Ward died when she fell out of her cousins' steam car and was run over by it. (Note: Although some sources assert Mary Ward to be the first person killed by a motor vehicle, a steam carriage fatal collision in July 1834 preceded Ward's demise. In the 1834 event, a steam carriage constructed by John Scott Russell and operating a public transport service between Glasgow and Paisley overturned, causing a boiler explosion which killed four or five passengers and injured others. Russell's carriage comprised a steam engine pulling a combined passenger and fuel tender; Mary Ward's collision may be characterized as the first fatality involving a vehicle in the form of a contemporary motorcar, in which the engine is mounted and passengers ride on the same frame.)

The British road engineer J. J. Leeming, compared the statistics for fatality rates in Great Britain, for transport-related incidents both before and after the introduction of the motor vehicle, for journeys, including those once by water that now are undertaken by motor vehicle: For the period 1863–1870 there were: 470 fatalities per million of population (76 on railways, 143 on roads, 251 on water); for the period 1891–1900 the corresponding figures were: 348 (63, 107, 178); for the period 1931–1938: 403 (22, 311, 70) and for the year 1963: 325 (10, 278, 37). Leeming concluded that the data showed that "travel accidents may even have been more frequent a century ago than they are now, at least for men".

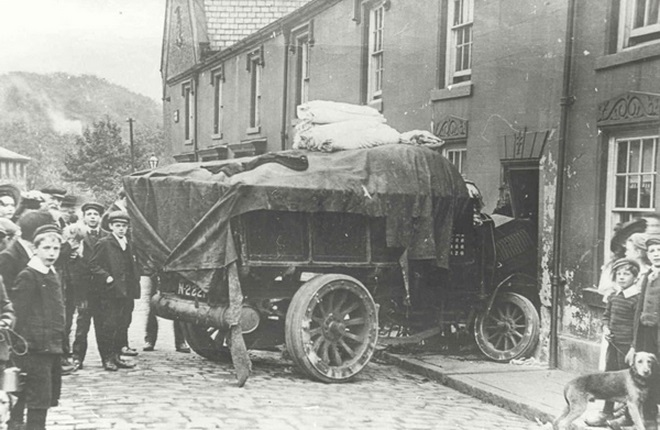
Truck collision with house in Compstall, United Kingdom (1914)

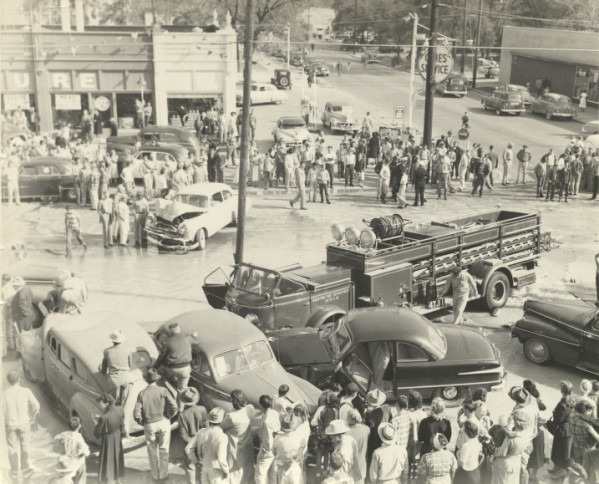
A traffic collision in 1952

He also compared the circumstances around road deaths as reported in various American states before the widespread introduction of 55 mph (89 km/h) speed limits and drunk-driving laws.

They took into account thirty factors which it was thought might affect the death rate. Among these were included the annual consumption of wine, of spirits and of malt beverages—taken individually—the amount spent on road maintenance, the minimum temperature, certain of the legal measures such as the amount spent on police, the number of police per 100,000 inhabitants, the follow-up programme on dangerous drivers, the quality of driver testing, and so on. The thirty factors were finally reduced to six by eliminating those found to have small or negligible effect. The final six were:

1. The percentage of the total state highway mileage that is rural
2. The percent increase in motor vehicle registration
3. The extent of motor vehicle inspection
4. The percentage of state-administered highway that is surfaced
5. The average yearly minimum temperature
6. The income per capita

These are placed in descending order of importance. These six accounted for 70% of the variations in the rate.

United States judges prioritized pedestrians' rights in city streets when early 20th century automobiles appeared. Pedestrian injuries were regarded as the fault of a motorist driving too fast. As automobile ownership increased, the rate of traffic deaths in the United States doubled from 1915 to 1921 when it reached 12 deaths per 100,000 Americans. The right to walk was considered dispensable a century later in 2021, when the annual death rate was 12.9 per 100,000. Safety focus on protecting the occupants of automobiles has victimized bicyclists and pedestrians whose injuries are attributed to individual carelessness. From 2010 to 2019, fatalities rose 36% for bicyclists and nearly doubled for those on foot. Reasons include larger vehicles, faster driving, and digital distractions making walking and biking in the United States far more dangerous than in other comparable nations.

The world's first autonomous car incident resulting in the death of a pedestrian occurred on 18 March 2018 in Arizona. The pedestrian was walking her bicycle outside of the crosswalk, and died in the hospital after she was struck by a self-driving car being tested by Uber.

== Society and culture ==
=== Economic costs ===
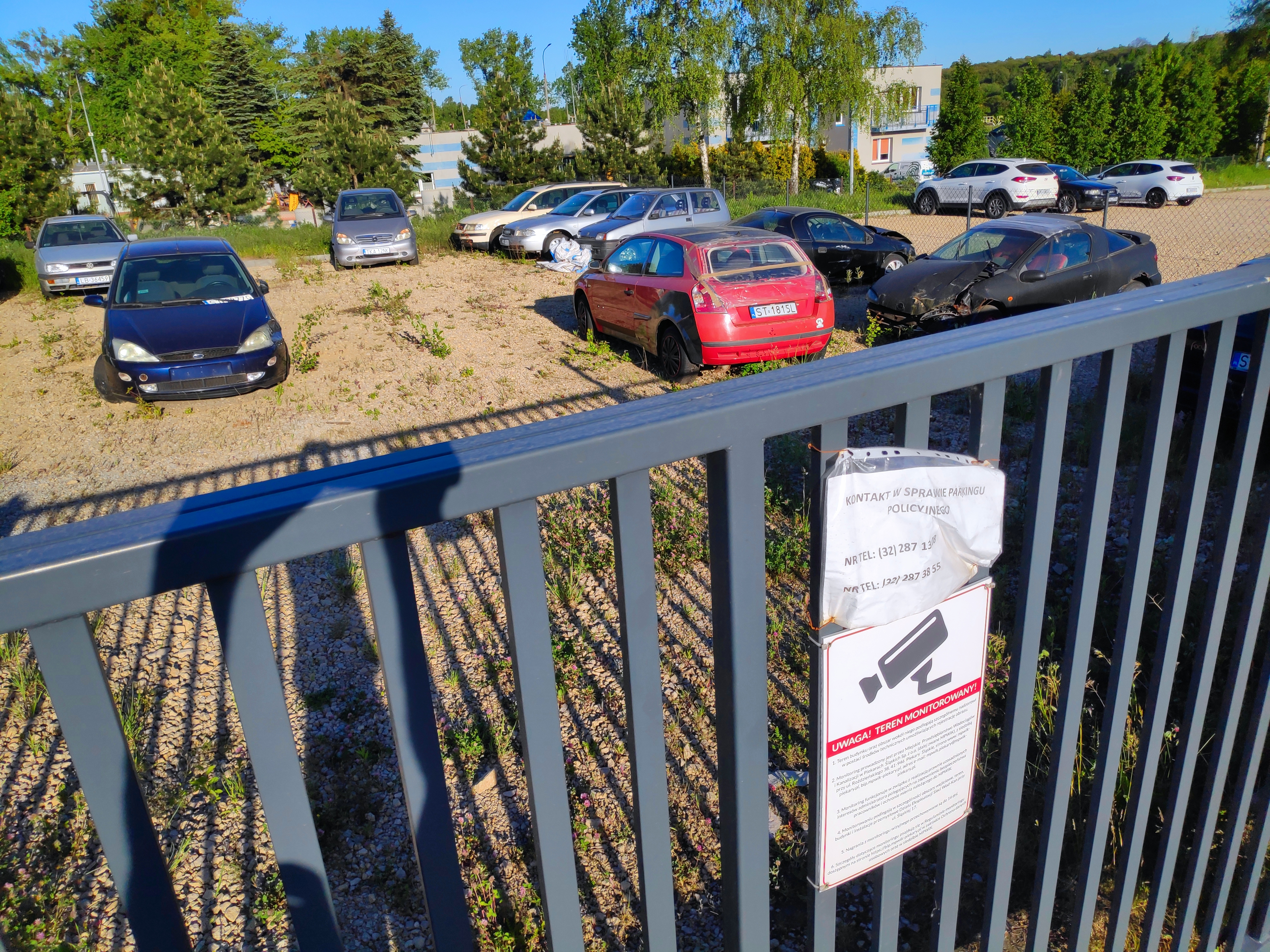
Police parking in Poland with vehicles impounded after car accidents

The global economic cost of MVCs was estimated at $518 billion per year in 2003, and $100 billion in developing countries. The Centers for Disease Control and Prevention estimated the U.S. cost in 2000 at $230 billion. A 2010 US report estimated costs of $277 billion, which included lost productivity, medical costs, legal and court costs, emergency service costs (EMS), insurance administration costs, congestion costs, property damage, and workplace losses. "The value of societal harm from motor vehicle crashes, which includes both economic impacts and valuation for lost quality-of-life, was $870.8 billion in 2010. Sixty-eight percent of this value represents lost quality-of-life, while 32 percent are economic impacts."

Traffic collision affect the national economy as the cost of road injuries are estimated to account for 1.0% to 2.0% of the gross national product (GNP) of every country each year. A recent study from Nepal showed that the total economic costs of road injuries were approximately $122.88 million, equivalent to 1.52% of the total Nepal GNP for 2017, indicating the growing national financial burden associate with preventable road injuries and deaths.

The economic cost to the individuals involved in an MVC varies widely depending on geographic distribution, and varies largely on depth of accident insurance cover, and legislative policy. In the UK for example, a survey conducted using 500 post-accident insurance policy customers, showed an average individual financial loss of £1300.00. This is due in part to voluntary excesses that are common tactics used to reduce overall premium, and in part due to under valuation of vehicles. By contrast, Australian insurance policy holders are subject to an average financial loss of $950.00 AUD.

=== Legal consequences ===
There are a number of possible legal consequences for causing a traffic collision, including:

- Traffic citations: drivers who are involved in a collision may receive one or more traffic citations for improper driving conduct such as speeding, failure to obey a traffic control device, or driving under the influence of drugs or alcohol. Convictions for traffic violations are usually penalized with fines, and for more severe offenses, the suspension or revocation of driving privileges.
- Civil lawsuits: a driver who causes a traffic collision may be sued for damages resulting from the collision, including damages to property and injuries to other persons. Companies can be held liable if their employees cause motor vehicle crashes under a theory of vicarious liability. Other times, injured people can file a product liability lawsuit against a company that designed or distributed a dangerous vehicle or car part.
- Criminal prosecution: More severe driving misconduct, including impaired driving, may result in criminal charges against the driver. In the event of a fatality, a charge of vehicular homicide is occasionally prosecuted, especially in cases involving alcohol. Convictions for alcohol offenses may result in the revocation or long term suspension of the driver's license, and sometimes jail time, mandatory drug or alcohol rehabilitation, or both.

==== Fraud ====
Sometimes, people may make false insurance claims or commit insurance fraud by staging collisions or jumping in front of moving cars.

==== United Kingdom ====
In the United Kingdom, the Pre-Action Protocol for Low Value Personal Injury Claims in Road Traffic Accidents from 31 July 2013, otherwise known as the RTA Protocol,

describes the behaviour the court expects of the parties prior to the start of proceedings where a claimant claims damages valued at no more than the Protocol upper limit as a result of a personal injury sustained by that person in a road traffic accident.

As of February 2022 the "upper limit" is £25,000 for an accident which occurred on or after 31 July 2013; the limit under a previous version of the protocol was £10,000 for an accident which had occurred on or after 30 April 2010 but before 31 July 2013.

==== United States ====
Motor vehicle crashes are the leading cause of death in the workplace in the United States accounting for 35 percent of all workplace fatalities. In the United States, individuals involved in motor vehicle collisions may be held financially liable for the consequences of a collision, including property damage, and injuries to passengers and drivers. Where another driver's vehicle is damaged as the result of a crash, some states allow the owner of the vehicle to recover both the cost of repair for the diminished value of the vehicle from the at-fault driver. Because the financial liability that results from causing a crash is so high, most U.S. states require drivers to carry liability insurance to cover these potential costs. In the event of serious injuries or fatalities, it is possible for injured persons to seek compensation in excess of the at-fault driver's insurance coverage.

Liability rules vary from state to state, with some laws adopting a tort system and others a no-fault insurance system. Most use a tort-based system, wherein injured people seek financial compensation from at-fault parties' insurance carriers. Twelve states take the no-fault approach, where injured parties file their primary claims with their own insurer.

Tort reform has changed the legal landscape. For example, Michigan had a unique no-fault system that guaranteed lifetime benefits for people injured in motor vehicle collisions. This changed in 2020, when the state legislature amended the laws, allowing people to opt for less coverage. While the aim of these laws is to reduce the cost of insurance premiums, catastrophically injured claimants might find themselves underinsured.

In some cases, involving a defect in the design or manufacture of motor vehicles, such as where defective design results in SUV rollovers or sudden unintended acceleration, crashes caused by defective tires, or where injuries are caused or worsened as a result of defective airbags, it is possible that the manufacturer will face a class action lawsuit.

=== Art ===
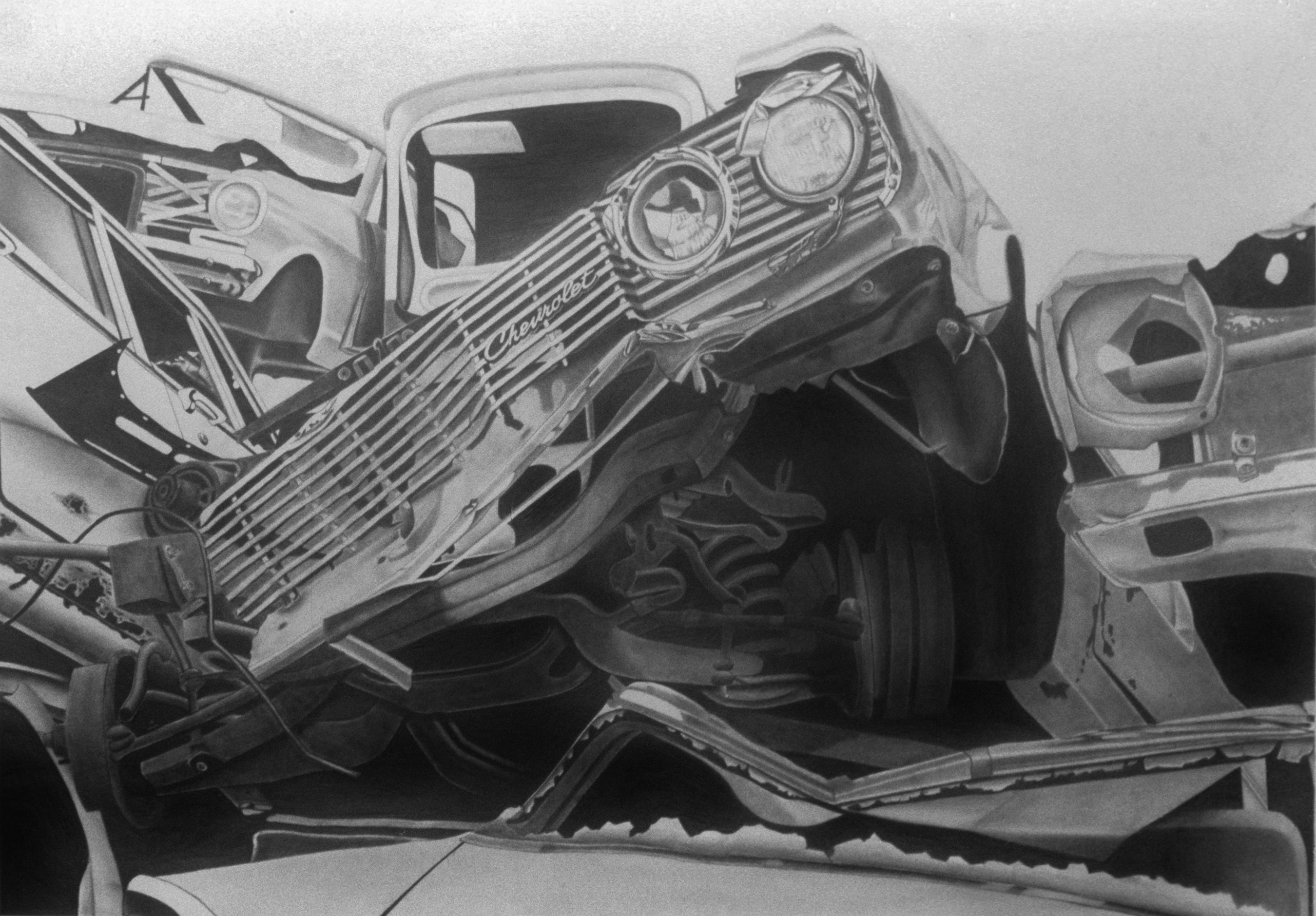
American Landscape by Jan A. Nelson (graphite on Strathmore rag, 1974)

Cars have come to represent a part of the American Dream of ownership coupled with the freedom of the road. The violence of a car wreck provides a counterpoint to that promise and is the subject of artwork by a number of artists, such as John Salt and Li Yan. Though English, John Salt was drawn to American landscapes of wrecked vehicles like Desert Wreck (airbrushed oil on linen, 1972). Similarly, Jan Anders Nelson works with the wreck in its resting state in junkyards or forests, or as elements in his paintings and drawings. American Landscape is one example of Nelson's focus on the violence of the wreck with cars and trucks piled into a heap, left to the forces of nature and time. This recurring theme of violence is echoed in the work of Li Yan. His painting Accident Nº 6 looks at the energy released during a crash.

Andy Warhol used newspaper pictures of car wrecks with dead occupants in a number of his Disaster series of silkscreened canvases. John Chamberlain used components of wrecked cars (such as bumpers and crumpled sheet metal fenders) in his welded sculptures.

Crash is a 1973 novel by English author J. G. Ballard about car-crash sexual fetishism that was made into a film by David Cronenberg in 1996.

== See also ==
- Accident management
- Assured Clear Distance Ahead
- Black ice
- Crash test
- Crashworthiness
- Defensive driving
- Forensic engineering
- Global road safety for workers
- Hill jumping
- List of countries by traffic-related death rate
- Lists of traffic collisions
- Multiple-vehicle collision
- Powell v Moody, English case law
- Roadkill
- Roadside memorial
- Skid mark
- Solomon curve
- Totaled
- Transportation safety in the United States
- Underride collision
- Unsafe at Any Speed
- Traffic collision reconstruction
- Vehicle extrication
- Warning triangle
- Whiplash
- Work-related road safety in the United States
