= Uninsured motorist clause =

Car insurance provision in the United States

An uninsured motorist clause is a provision commonly found in United States automobile insurance policies that provides for a driver to receive damages for any injury he or she receives from an uninsured, negligent driver. The owner of the policy pays a premium to the insurance company to include this clause. Although not exclusive, this coverage is typically added to an automobile insurance policy. In the event of a qualifying accident, the insurance company pays the difference between what the uninsured driver can pay and what the injured driver would be entitled to as if the uninsured motorist had proper insurance.

This type of coverage is meant to prevent the possibility that a motorist will have to pay for medical expenses and property damage to his vehicle as a result of the accident with the underinsured at-fault motorist. The ramifications related to being hit by an underinsured motorist vary by individual state laws.

It is mandatory for the insurance carrier to provide such coverage in some states, such as Pennsylvania, Illinois, Maryland, and New York.

== Defining an uninsured motorist for the purpose of an uninsured motorist clause ==
There are three types of uninsured motorists defined under the uninsured motorist clause:

1. Individuals who do not have liability coverage for the vehicle he or she is operating. In most states, it is a crime to be uninsured in this manner.
2. When an individual flees the scene of an accident without leaving sufficient information to identify him or herself, the individual is considered uninsured for the purposes of an uninsured motorist provision. However, a positive ID of the license plates in a hit and run accident will often be considered by insurance companies sufficient information to identify the negligent Hit and run driver. Such identification will often lead to the denial of an uninsured motorist claim, as insurance companies will often litigate the claim, bringing in the registered owner of the vehicle with matching plates, even when that person denies involvement in the accident. In some states, coverage for uninsured property damage may be unavailable, although it is possible that collision coverage will be available in relation to vehicle damage.
  - California
  - Colorado
  - Illinois
  - Louisiana
  - Ohio
3. A stolen vehicle is uninsured from the time it has been stolen. A person who has been injured by a stolen vehicle may qualify for an uninsured claim.

A few states require physical contact for uninsured claims. If contact is required, it can be any kind of contact, such as that between two cars, but can also consist of a vehicle contacting the leg of a motorcyclist or a motorcycle tire.

== Bodily Injury Coverage ==
=== Uninsured Motorist ===
Uninsured Motorist Bodily Injury Coverage covers a victim's medical expenses, lost wages, and other injury related expenses in an instance where the other driver is not insured. This coverage applies only if the other party is found to be at fault for the incident. Depending on the state, the insurance company may or may not require the victim to identify the other vehicle/driver. Many states will cover a hit and run incident.

=== Underinsured Motorist ===
Underinsured Motorist Bodily Injury Coverage protects a driver by financially compensating him for his injury in the event that he is injured in an accident by someone else who negligently caused his injuries when the driver or owner has liability coverage for his or her vehicle that is less than the amount of the victim's liability coverage. Underinsured coverage may also be referred to as an underinsured motorist clause or endorsement or SUM, which is an abbreviation for Supplementary Underinsured Motorist coverage.

== Litigating an uninsured motorist claim ==
Most states require a victim to sue the uninsured motorist (or a fictitious John Doe hit and run driver when litigating the second category of uninsured motorist claim) for his injuries in order to prevail on a breach of contract action against the insurance carrier. Some states, such as Virginia, require that the victim actually obtain a judgment against the uninsured motorist (while serving the uninsured motorist carrier in the lawsuit so that the carrier can defend the suit) and then demand payment from the uninsured motorist carrier prior to suing the carrier for any breach of an uninsured motorist provision. Normally there is no need to sue the carrier in such states as Virginia unless there is a dispute as to coverage. Liability is rarely an issue in cases against John Doe defendants and in any regard, must be litigated in the first suit against the John Doe, if at all. The insurance company will ordinarily pay the judgment, up to the policy limits, once a court determines that an uninsured motorist was at fault. Some states' laws also allow additional insurance coverage to the insured policyholder through policy stacking provisions, whereby a claim may be made against multiple uninsured motorist policies.

== See also ==
- Personal injury protection
