= Vehicular suicide =

Suicide method

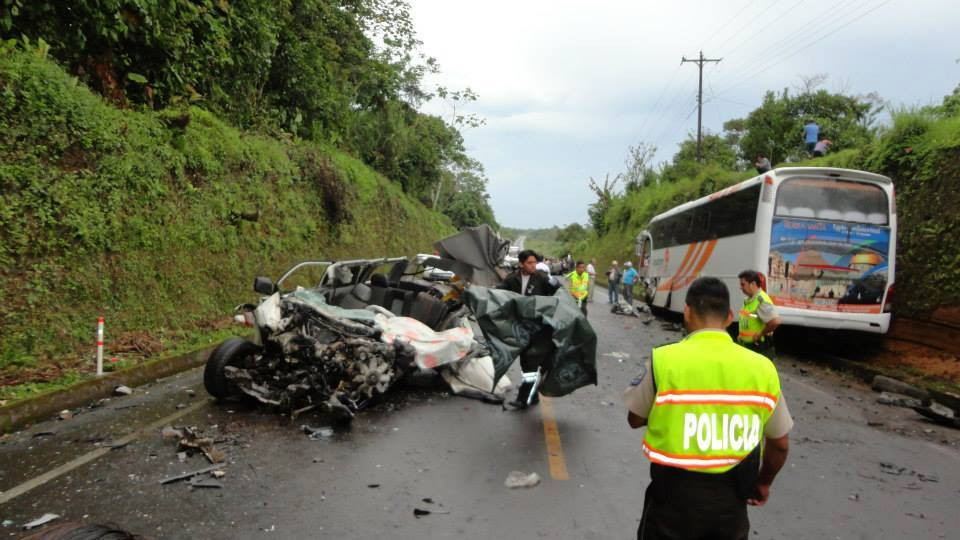
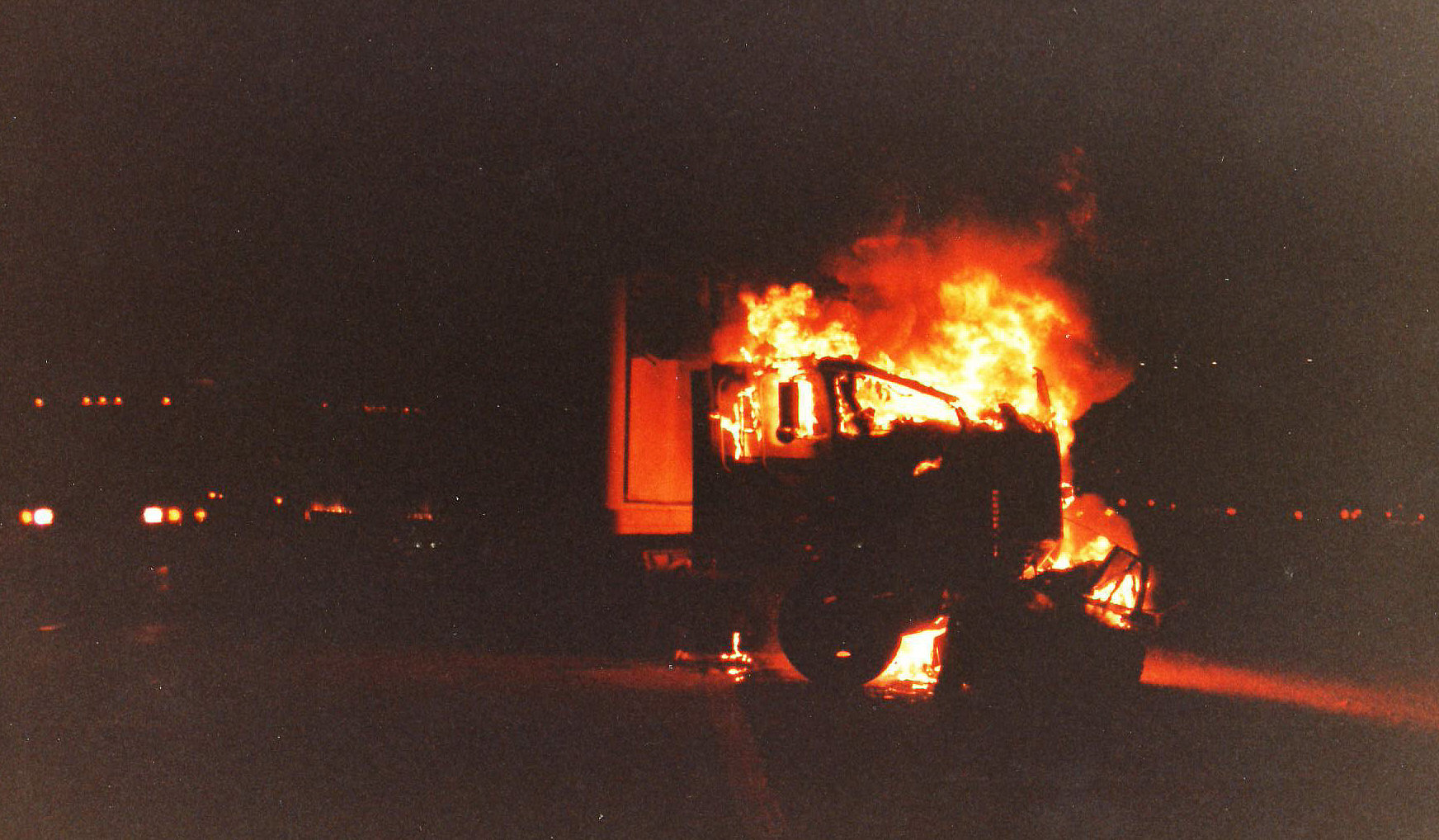
It may be difficult to determine if collisions like these were motivated by suicide.

Vehicular suicide is the use of a motor vehicle to intentionally cause one's own death.

== Suffocation ==
Suicide by carbon monoxide poisoning may be attempted by running the engine in an enclosed garage, or by piping the exhaust gas into the driver's compartment with a hose. However, catalytic converters required for air quality regulations eliminate over 99% of carbon monoxide produced.

== Traffic collisions ==
Intentional traffic collisions may be a chosen method of suicide where speed limits are high enough to produce fatal deceleration. Modern cars have high rates of acceleration and can easily reach very high speeds in short distances, while most cars cannot protect occupants from disability or death in frontal impact collisions exceeding 70 km/h (43 mph). Motor vehicles can be tempting as machines of self-injury or self-destruction for individuals attempting to disguise their suicidal motivation, because widespread use of the word accident implies traffic collisions are unintentional, and because traffic collisions are already so frequent. The percentage of suicides among the tens of thousands of people killed annually in United States traffic collisions is unknown because suicides are often misclassified as accidents if no suicide note is found. Considering the large number of suicides by other methods, it would be remarkable if vehicles were less used as a convenient method of self-destruction trying to minimize insurance and religious complications. In addition, many attempts at driver suicide presumably result in permanent disabilities rather than death.

The probability and severity of traffic collisions may be increased by suicidal behaviors including drunk driving and speeding. These risky driving behaviors are associated with depression as contributing factors to vehicular suicide. Impact velocity may be maximized by exceeding speed limits or by maneuvering into a head-on collision with a heavier and less maneuverable vehicle like a bus or semi-trailer truck. Crash investigators found head-on collisions with heavier vehicles were a suicide method more common than the single vehicle crashes sometimes assumed to be more typical. These suicidal collisions may kill or injure others.

=== Implications ===
Aside from use for premeditated suicides, as commuters spend more time driving, vehicles may be available at the instant of a momentary and temporary impulse towards self-destruction fueled by road rage. Suicides comprise nearly two-thirds of the 33,000 annual gun deaths in the United States. Motor vehicles remain widely available while gun control reduces access to firearms. The percentage of traffic fatalities which are suicides appears to be increasing with time.

Understanding the fraction of traffic fatalities attributable to suicide is important because many traffic safety measures are unlikely to influence suicides. Unmeasured suicides in empirical data used to evaluate traffic safety measures will result in systematic underestimation of effectiveness for non-suicidal road users.

People can also stand or walk in front of oncoming traffic; this is different from insurance fraud as the person in question is trying to intentionally cause fatal bodily injuries to themselves. Insurance companies do not cover vehicular suicide.

== See also ==
- Vehicular homicide
- Suicide by pilot
