= Personal injury protection =

Form of insurance coverage

Personal injury protection (PIP) is an extension of car insurance available in some U.S. states that covers medical expenses and, in some cases, lost wages and other damages. PIP is sometimes referred to as "no-fault" coverage, because the statutes enacting it are generally known as no-fault laws, and PIP is designed to be paid without regard to "fault," or more properly, legal liability. That is, even if the person seeking PIP coverage caused the accident, they are entitled to make a claim under the PIP portion of their policy. "No-Fault" does not mean that insurance premium of the person making the claim will not increase. Typically a PIP claim is made by the insured driver to their own insurance company, however, there are several exceptions that allow persons who have been injured in an accident to make a PIP claim if they do not own a vehicle. The particular state law and policy language of the insurer should be reviewed to see what exceptions exist in that state.

== Auto insurance ==
PIP is a mandatory coverage in some states. Others, like Texas, require the insurer to offer PIP but the named insured can reject PIP in writing. PIP coverage may vary from state to state in terms of both what is covered and what types of treatments are considered medically necessary and reasonable. In Texas, PIP coverage will cover medical expenses, eighty percent of lost wages, and someone to take care of the injured party. Some states also allow for PIP claims even if a workers' compensation claim exists, while others do not. Some states PIP is the insurance of first resort to pay for medical bills when injured in an automobile accident.

In some states, PIP is subrogatable, meaning that your insurance carrier will pay for your loss, regardless of liability, and then recover (or subrogate) what it paid from the liable party's insurance carrier. This generally leaves the claimant/insured in a much better financial position, because his or her medical bills are paid, and the insurance carriers get to fight it out on their own, and after the fact.

PIP can cover, within the specified dollar and time limits, the medical and funeral expenses of the insured, others in its vehicle at the time of the loss, and any first party if struck as a pedestrian by any vehicle. The basic coverage is for the insured's own injuries, on a first-party basis, without regard to liability. Again, it is only available in certain states. A pedestrian struck by a vehicle is covered under that vehicles liability.

Many states that do not have PIP have auto medical payments (AMP) coverage, and some states have both. AMP is also a first-party coverage, without regard to liability, but is only subrogable in a few states, and generally optional.

AMP and PIP limits range from $1,000 to $250,000 depending on the injury and the state, though many insurance providers have a relatively low limit of $5,000. A Michigan no-fault policy provides unlimited medical and rehabilitation benefits. Claimants involved in an auto accident are wise to submit their own insurance information to their medical providers, as third party carriers are under no legal obligation to pay a claimant's medical bills, while first party carriers are.

Third party carriers are subject to payment only after a judgment against them, and any payments prior to that are considered voluntary. Settling a claim with a third party carrier is considered a voluntary payment.

=== States with mandatory PIP coverage ===
- Delaware
- Florida
- Hawaii
- Kansas
- Kentucky
- Maryland (unless a waiver is signed at initial purchase of the policy)
- Massachusetts
- Michigan
- Minnesota
- New Jersey
- New York
- North Dakota
- Oregon
- Pennsylvania
- Utah

Certain states require insurance companies to offer PIP coverage, but allow the insured to reject it in writing:

- Washington Once you reject the coverage it stays that way until you request it be added or start a new policy.
- Texas
- Arkansas is optional

== Other coverage ==
Personal injury protection could also refer to personal injury insurance or coverage, which is insurance in any context which includes coverage for personal injury, particularly coverage for emotional distress (typically negligent infliction of emotional distress rather than intentional infliction of emotional distress), libel, or defamation as opposed to coverage for only bodily injury. Home insurance typically includes coverage for liability arising from bodily injury, especially on an insureds' premises, but not from liability arising from mental injury. Coverage from mental injury can be included and is typically called "personal injury" coverage.

== See also ==
- Uninsured motorist clause
